= Lithuania–Poland border =

International border

Lithuania-Poland border
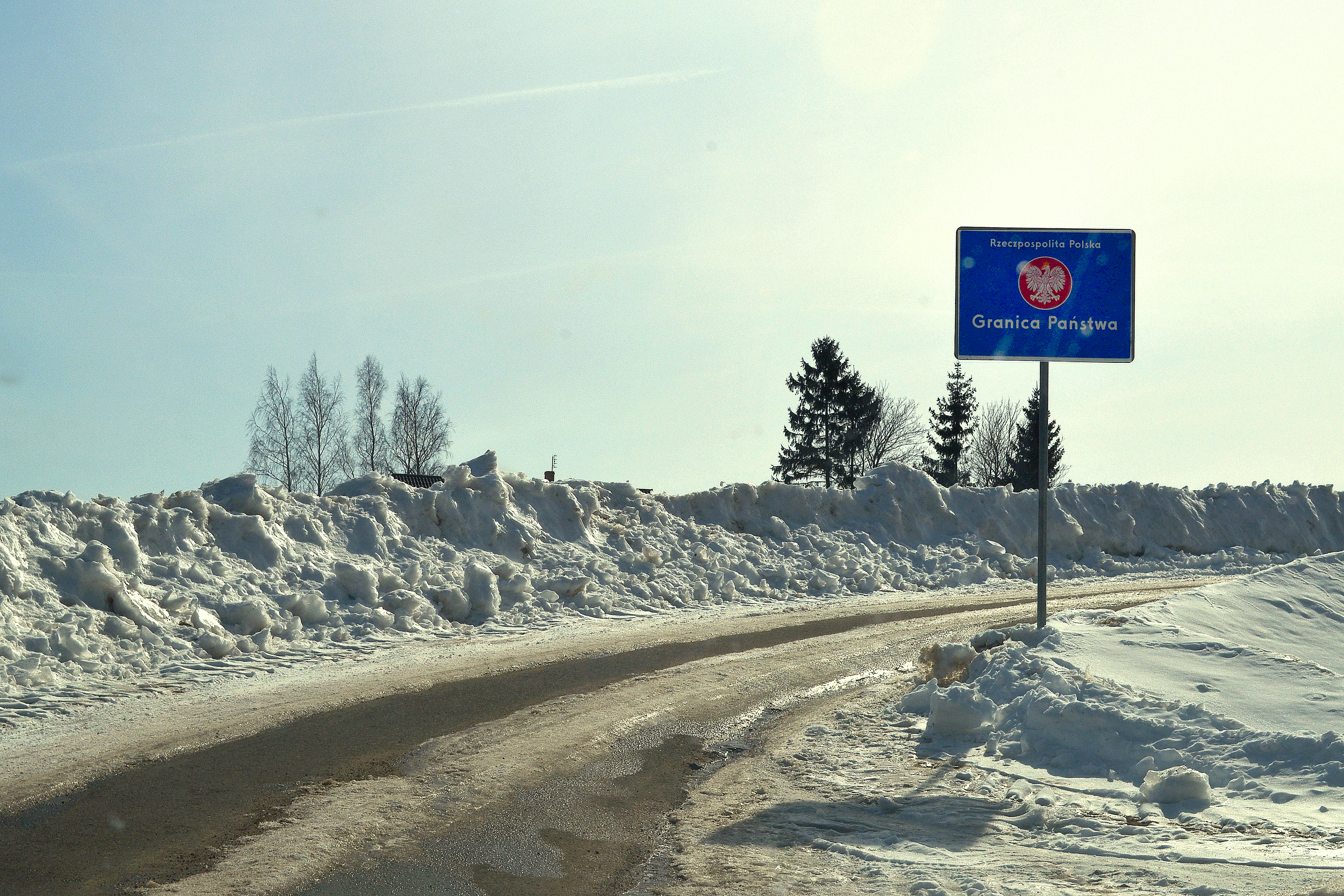
- Border sign in Poland

Characteristics
- Entities: Lithuania Poland
- Length: 104 kilometres (65 mi)

History
- Established: 1922; 1945
- Current shape: 6 September 1991
- Treaties: Suwałki Agreement (1920)

Lithuanian and Polish boundary markers

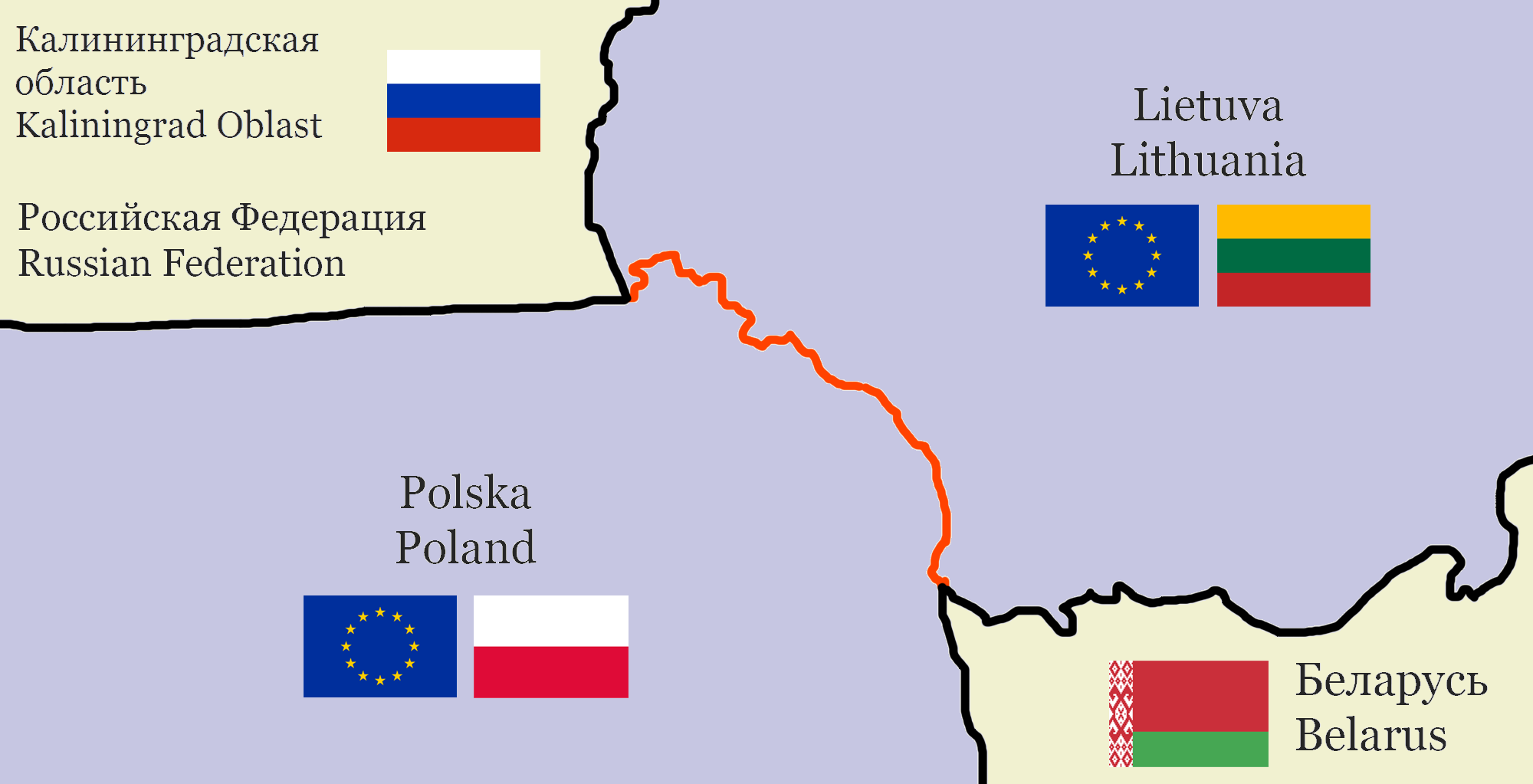
The current border between the Republic of Lithuania and the Republic of Poland. It was a part of the Lithuanian–Polish border since the Suwałki Agreement.

The Lithuania–Poland border is the state border between the Republic of Lithuania and the Republic of Poland. The length of the border is 104 kilometres (65 mi). It runs from the Lithuania–Poland–Russia tripoint southeast to the Belarus–Lithuania–Poland tripoint. It is an internal border of the European Union and the Schengen Zone.

It is the only land border that one of the Baltic states (which are members of the EU and NATO) shares with a country that is not a member of the Commonwealth of Independent States.

== History ==
In medieval times, the Kingdom of Poland and the Grand Duchy of Lithuania had a vast and often changing border. From the Union of Lublin (1569) to the partitions of Poland, there was no Polish-Lithuanian border, as both countries were a part of a single federated entity, the Polish–Lithuanian Commonwealth. During the partitions of Poland era, there were borders between the Congress Poland (Augustów Voivodeship) and territory seized by the Russian Empire (Kovno Governorate and Vilna Governorate). A different border existed between the Second Polish Republic and Lithuania in the period of 1918–1939. Following the Polish–Lithuanian War, from 1922 onward it was stable and had a length of 521 km. Suwałki Agreement (1920) established the demarcation line through the Suwałki Region and for the most part it remains the border between Poland and Lithuania in modern times. The current border was established in the aftermath of World War II.

In the Suwałki County the settlement of Mejszeszki, located north-west of the town of Wiżajny, was incorporated into Poland. To the north-east of Wiżajny, near the village of Laskowskie, the Lithuanian settlement of Auksztokalnia reached Poland. The border ran the same as in 1939. The area of the commune was inhabited by Lithuanian people. In the Kadaryszki commune, Poland was allocated 4 hectares of land, and changes to the border zone were minimal. Then the border ran through the Zaboryszki commune. In its area, in the town of Trampole, one farm was transferred to Poland. In the Serwy commune, near the village of Wołyńce, 3 pieces of land with an area of 0.5 ha were transferred from Poland to Lithuania. On Gaładuś Lake an island left Poland, in the Giby Commune the following settlements handed over from Poland to the Lithuanian SSR: Kalety, Studzianka, Kodzie, Wolka Rzędowa, Rynkowie, Dąbrowka, Czortek. The border was demarcated without considering elementary economic principles. It resulted in the separation of most agricultural land from habitats and, in some cases, divided habitats. It was planned to create a security belt within a radius of 20 km from the border, from which all national minorities would be removed and repopulated with repatriates. This was intended to prevent the Belarusian population from crossing the border illegally. A similar conclusion was made in the Sokółka County. In Augustów County, the population supported border changes. In Suwałki County, the District Plenipotentiary for delimitation stated that Lithuanians living in the areas which were annexed to Poland were hostile to the authorities and should be removed abroad.

In August 1948, the TASS agency announced a communication on the completion of delimitation of the border. However, the local authorities determined the final shape of the border and belonging of individual villages or their fragments for more than a year and a half. The border since runs along the Marycha River and the current Polish-Lithuanian border, from the point on Marycha, 2 kilometers below the site, to the point where the territories of the Polish and Lithuanian SSR and the area of former East Prussia near the hamlet of Gromadczyzna meet (54.36081715,22.79983067), over a distance of approximately 102 kilometers from a deviation from the previously mentioned border at the village of Graużyny to the north and at the town of Misiszki to the south and a few minor straightening (border posts no. 1789 to 1987), leaving on the Polish side the following settlements: Pozasko, Budwieć, Markiszki, Hołyny, Rachelany, Burbiszki, Borysówka, Poluńce, Berżniki, Wołyńce, Krejwiany, Trompoliszki, Wojciuliszki, Jegliniec, Budzisko, Majdan, Kopowo, Smolnica, Poszeszupie, Bykowszczyzna, Ejszeryszki, Wiłkupie, Olszanka Stakuny, Burniszki, Grzybina and Gromadczyna and an island on Lake Gałdauś. The following settlements remained on the Lithuanian (then part of the Soviet Union) side: Helenowo, Ustronie, Podbuwieć, Subacze, Kuciony, Okmiany, Kalwiszki, Tarnówka, Barwisze, Uździenniki, Gralińce, Bielańce, Kybartai, Polance, Buraki, Olkszniany, Giłujsze, Trompole, Zegaryszki, Grungliszki, Durpiej, Czarna Buda, Wołkowizna, Kamionka, Rykosieje, Lubowo, Nowosady, Barwisze, Wartele, Auksztokalne, Ogliniszki, Poszyrwinty, Misiszki and Okszyszki and two islands on Lake Gaładuś. The border crossed the settlement of Graużyny and a number of lakes, in particular Lake Walenicze, Gaładuś, Graużyny (54.3916637 22.9444432) Durajewo and Olgiel up to the tripoint border between Poland, Lithuania and Russia (Kaliningrad Oblast) at 54.3633455, 22.79200182.

The border has since remained identical during the Soviet occupation of the Baltic states as well as after the restoration of the independence of Lithuania on 11 March 1990. On 5 March 1996, both countries signed a treaty on the common border, confirming its status and demarcation, as well as agreeing on the technical cooperation.

Lithuania and Poland joined the Schengen Area in 2007. This meant that all border checkpoints were removed along the border in December 2007, allowing unrestricted border crossing.

On 26 February 2023, Lithuanian customs reinstated third party cargo check points at the Lithuania–Poland border, due increased cargo freight from non-EU countries via Poland and Lithuania to Belarus.

On 7 July 2025, Polish Prime Minister Donald Tusk announced the temporary reinstatement of border checks along the borders with Lithuania and Germany.

On 20 October 2025, the Via Baltica connecting Poland and the Baltic States was inaugurated in a ceremony led by Lithuanian President Gitanas Nausėda and Polish president Karol Nawrocki at the border.

== Military significance ==
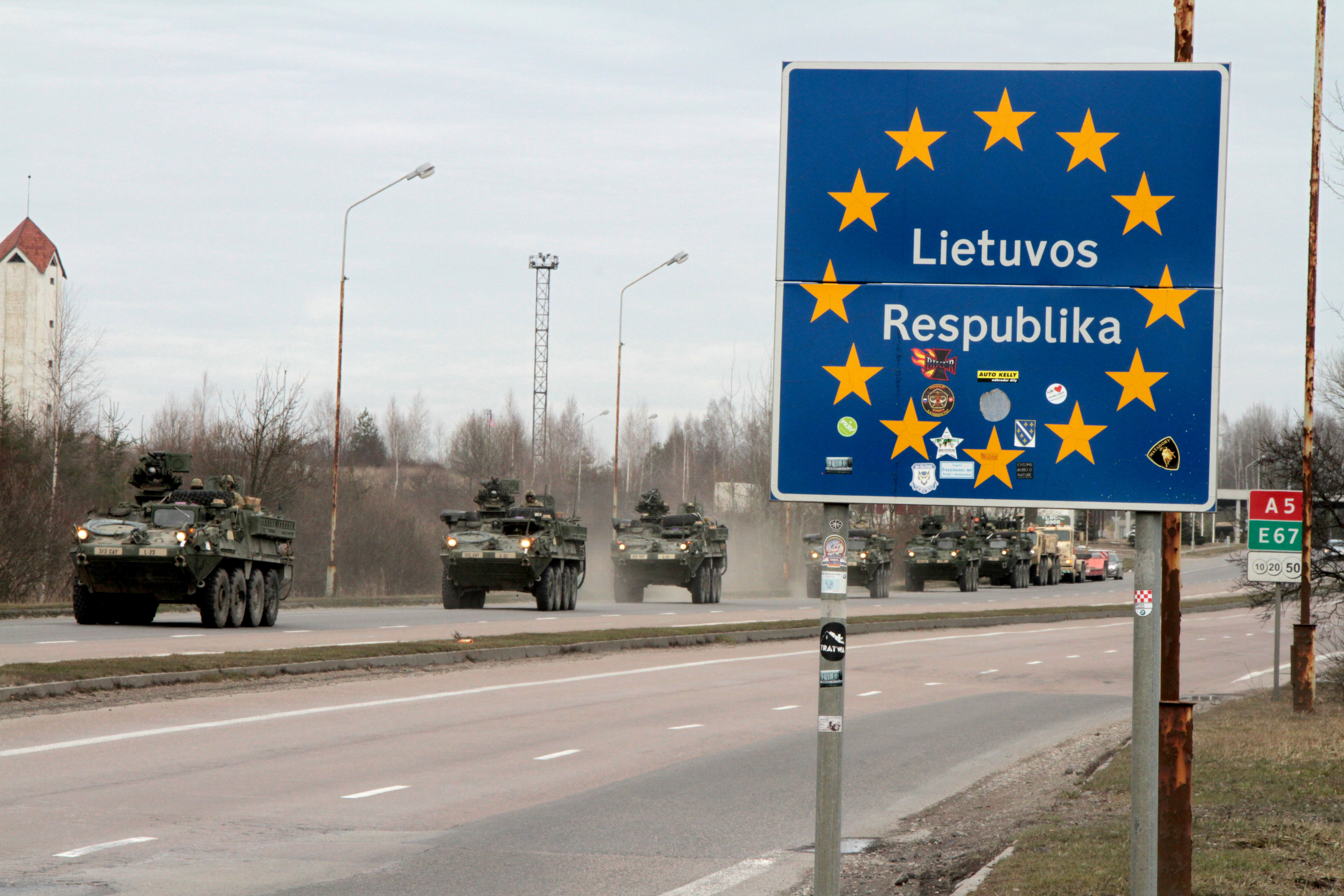
NATO troops during the Operation Dragoon Ride at the Lithuania–Poland border in 2015

To the military planners of NATO, the border area is known as the Suwałki Gap (named after the nearby town of Suwałki) because it represents a military difficulty. It is a flat narrow piece of land, a gap, that is between Belarus and Russia's Kaliningrad exclave and that connects the three NATO-member Baltic States to Poland and the rest of NATO. In the event of a Russian attack, the Suwałki Gap would for Russia be important both for connecting Kaliningrad to the rest of Russia, and to prevent military assistance from the other NATO countries to reach the Baltic countries.

In July 2016, two years after the annexation of Crimea by the Russian Federation and the beginning of the War in Donbas, NATO's member states agreed at the 2016 Warsaw summit to what would become known as the NATO Enhanced Forward Presence.

A July 2017 NATO exercise was for the first time focused on defense of the gap from a possible Russian attack, and used troops and materiel from US, British, Polish, Lithuanian and Croatian sources.

In September 2017, Russia and Belarus produced the Zapad 2017 exercise.

== Former border crossings ==
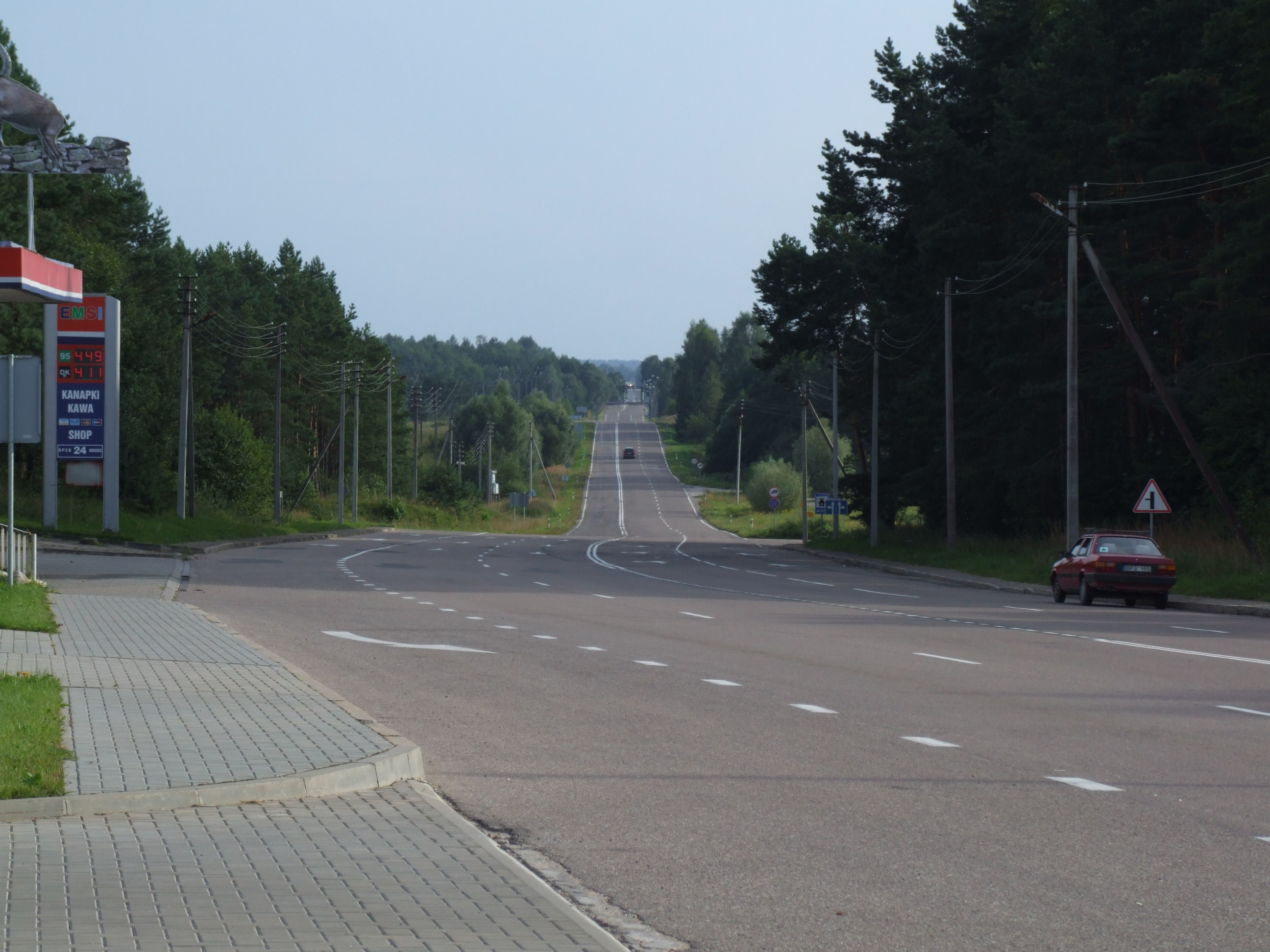
Former border crossing Ogrodniki–Lazdijai

In the period 1991–2007, there were three road and one rail border crossing between Poland and Lithuania.

On 1 May 2004, when both Poland and Lithuania joined the European Union, this border became an internal border of the European Union. On 21 December 2007, Poland and Lithuania acceded to the Schengen Agreement. After this, crossing the border became easier, as EU internal borders are open to all traffic with little need for control. There are still, however, occasional customs and police controls against smuggling of restricted goods; these affect only about 1% of travelers.

Road

- Budzisko–Kalvarija
- Ogrodniki–Lazdijai
- Berżniki–Kapčiamiestis

Rail

- Trakiszki–Šeštokai

== Gallery ==
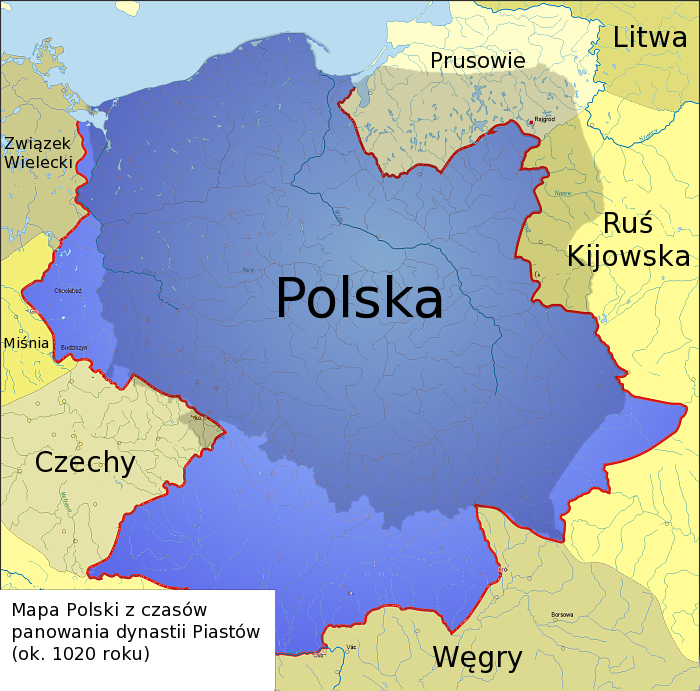
Map of Poland from the early 11th century shows Polish and Lithuanian lands separated by Old Prussian and Kievan Rus' territories

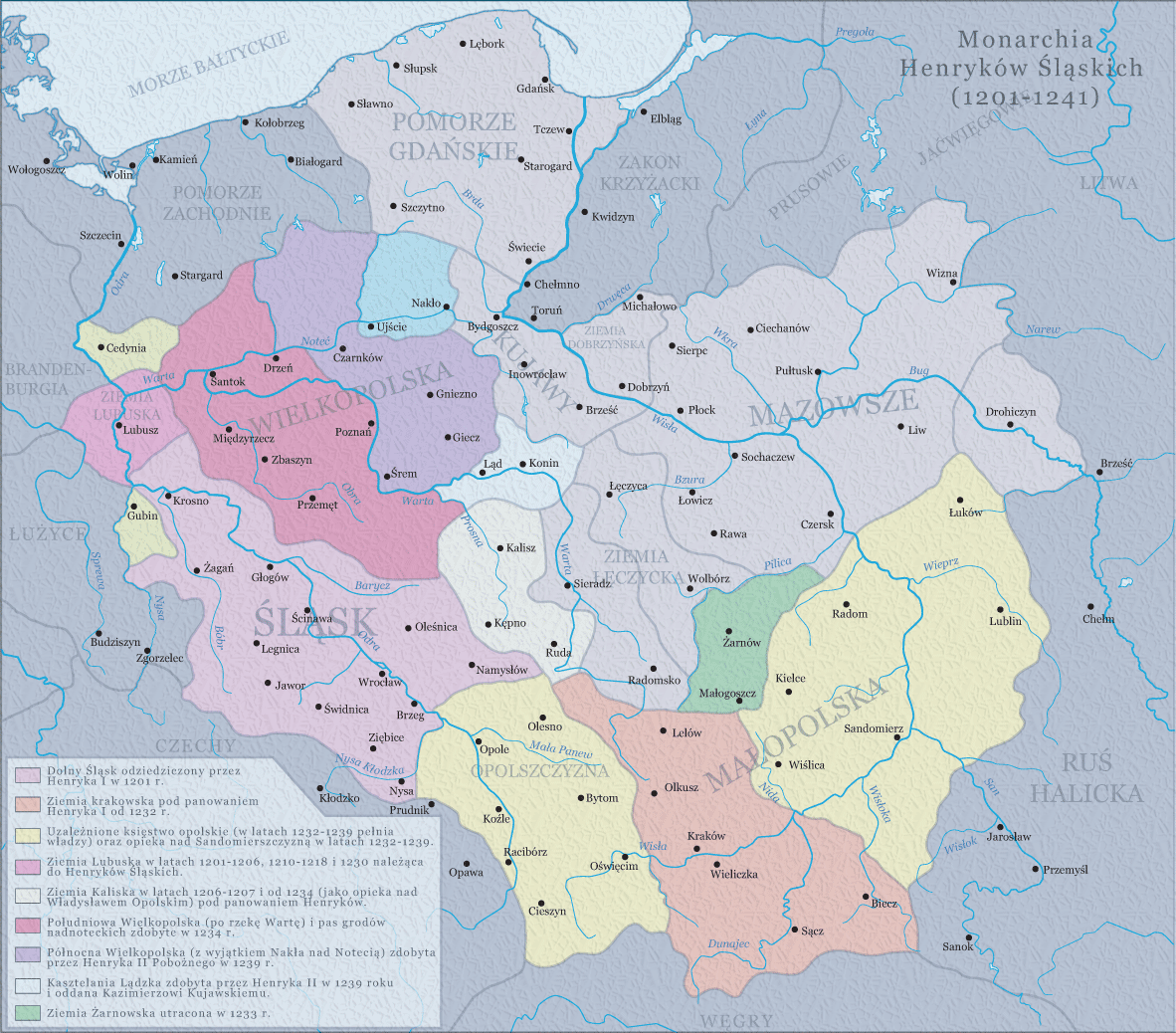
Map of Poland in the first half of the 13th century, shows a border between Duchy of Masovia and Lithuania

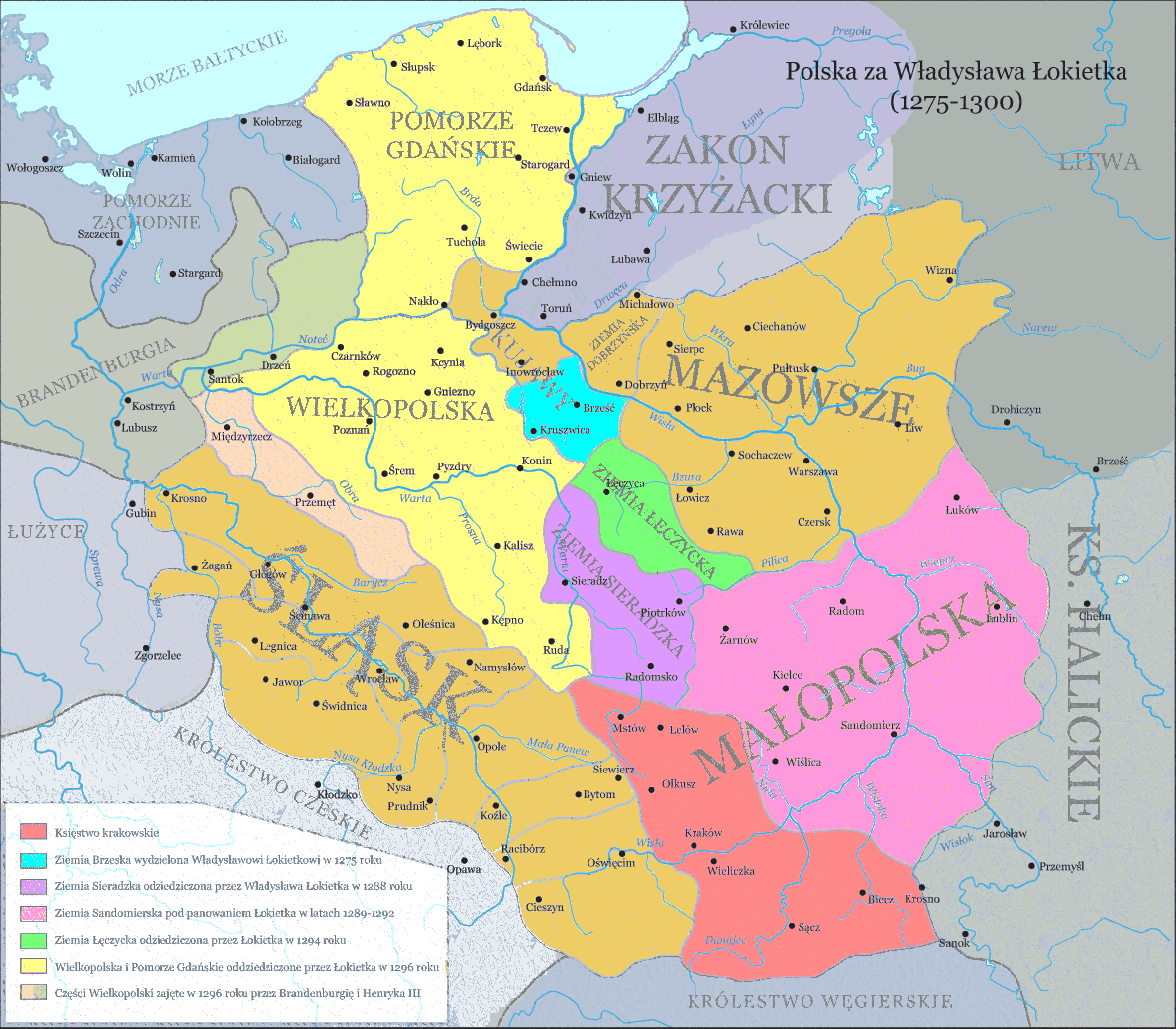
Map of Poland and Lithuania around 1275–1300, with visible Polish–Lithuanian border

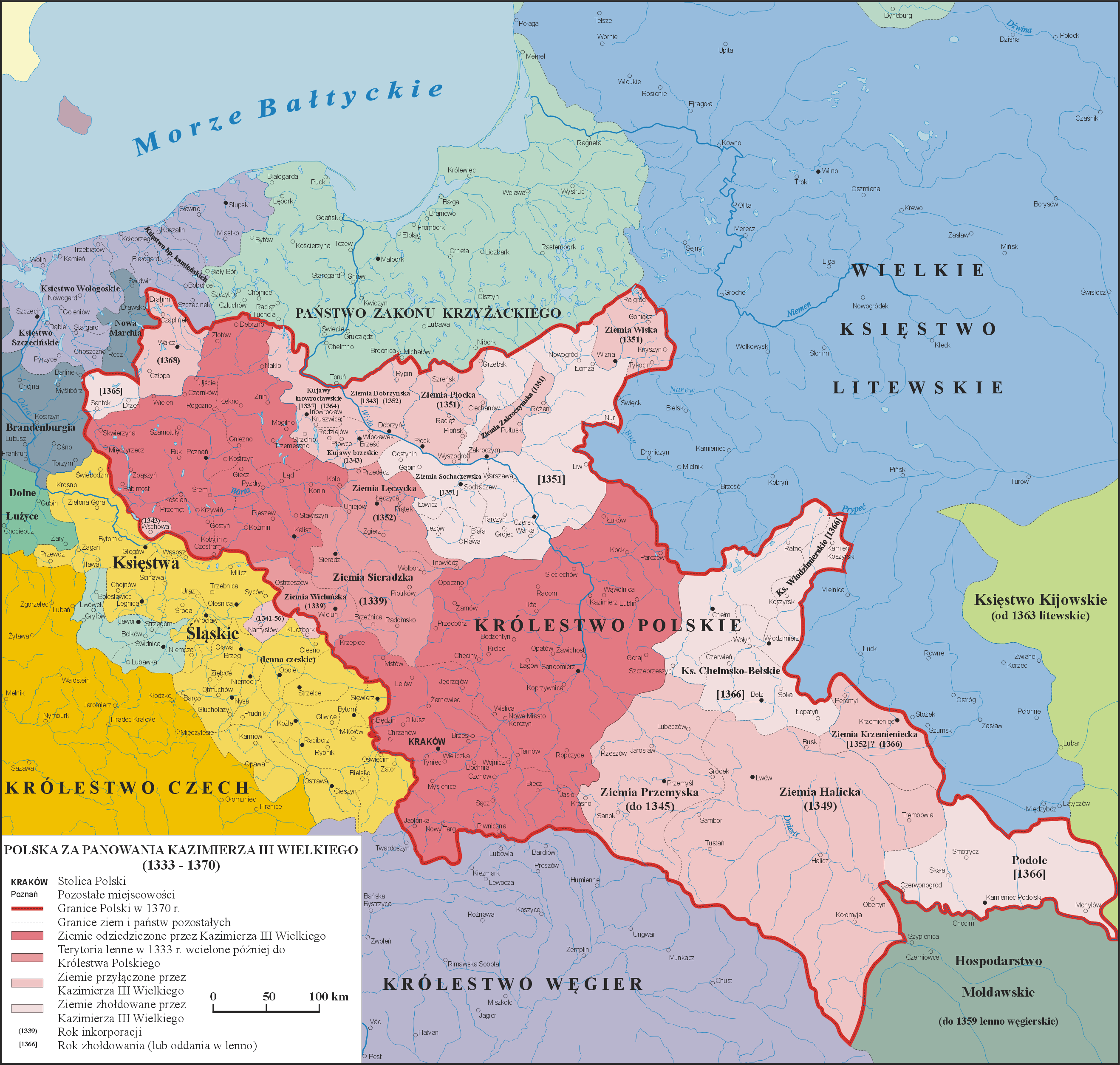
Map of Poland and Lithuania around 1333–1370, with visible Polish–Lithuanian border

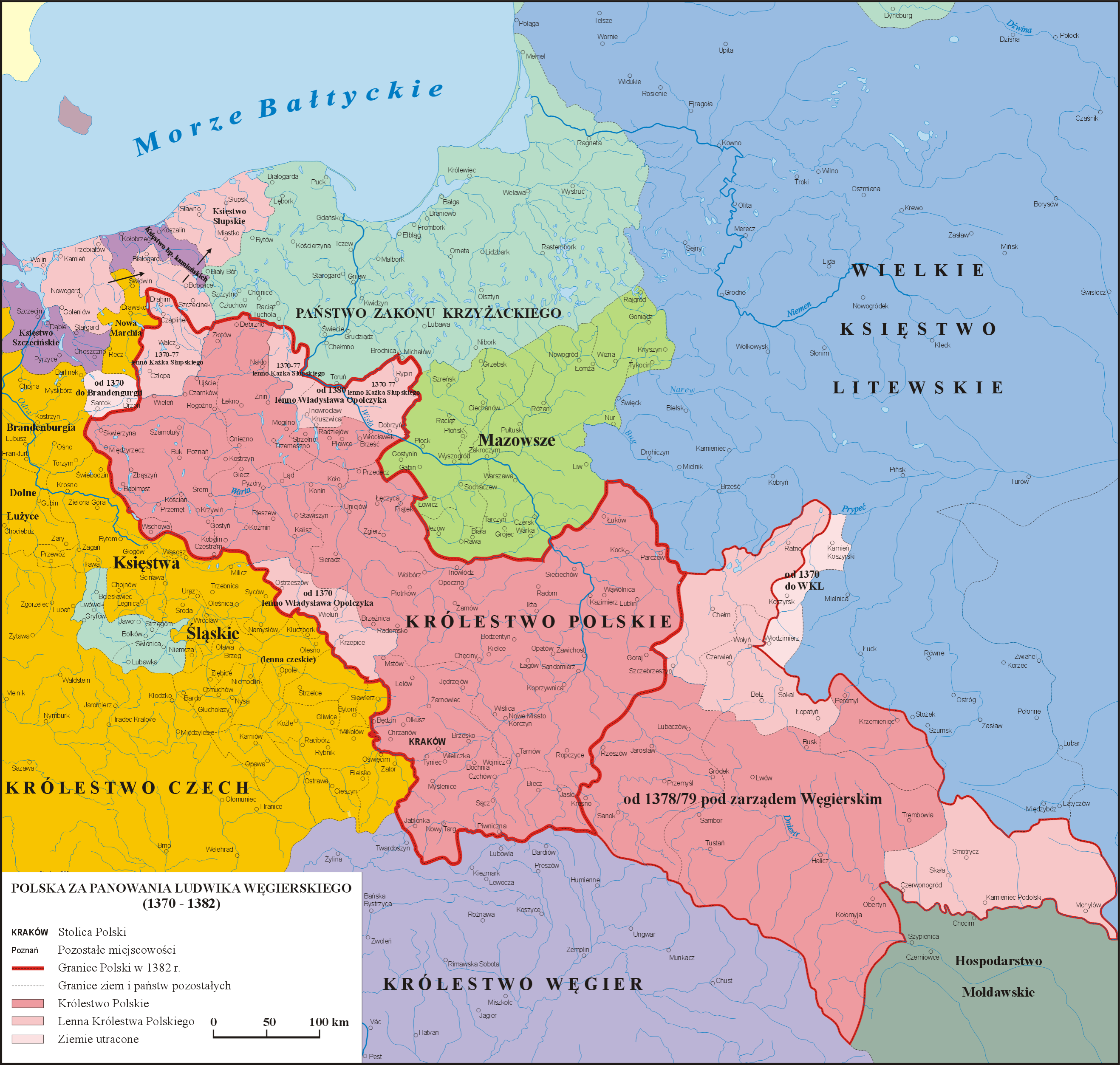
Map of Poland and Lithuania around 1370–1382, with visible Polish–Lithuanian border

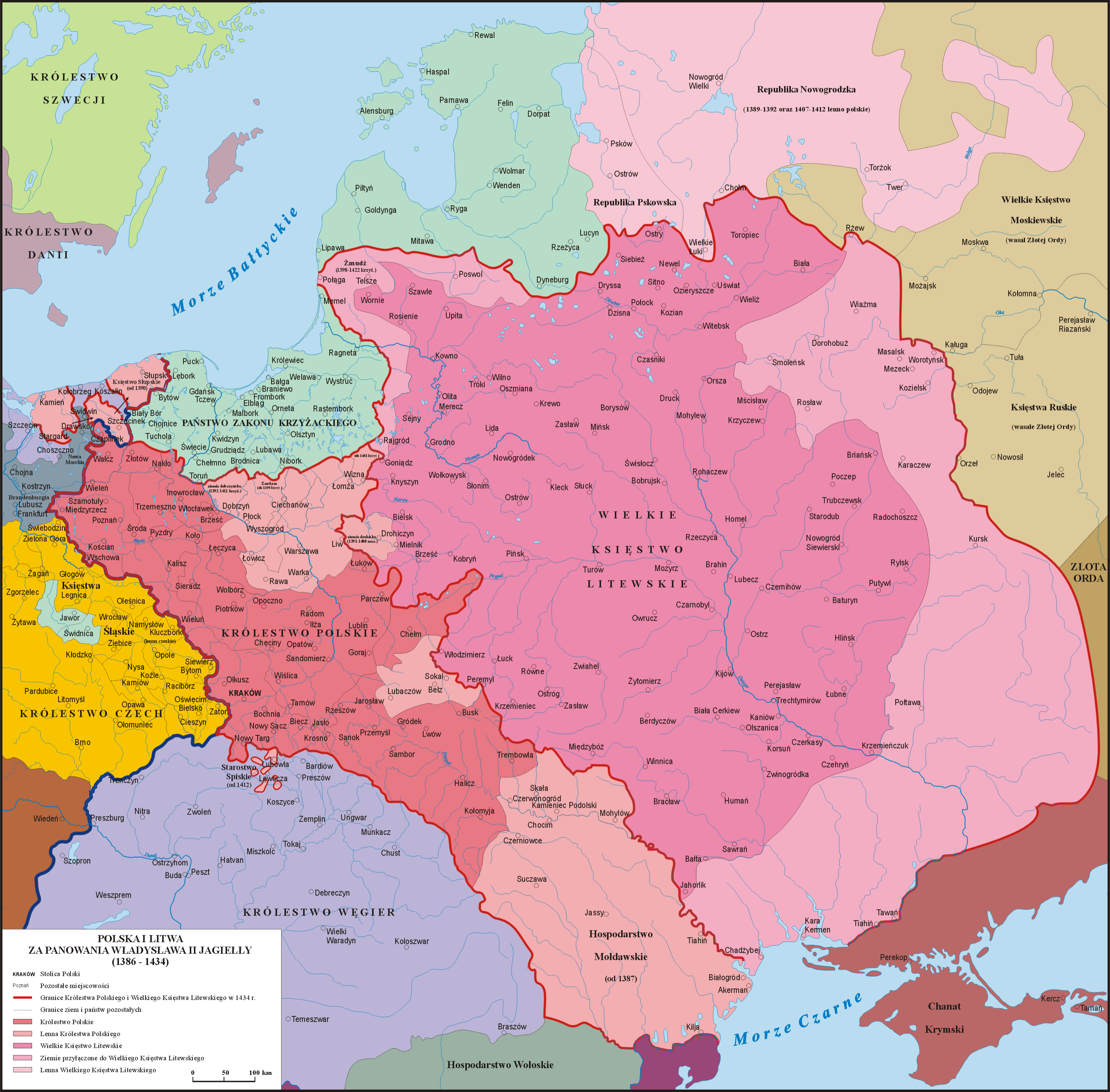
Map of Poland and Lithuania around 1386–1434, with visible Polish–Lithuanian border

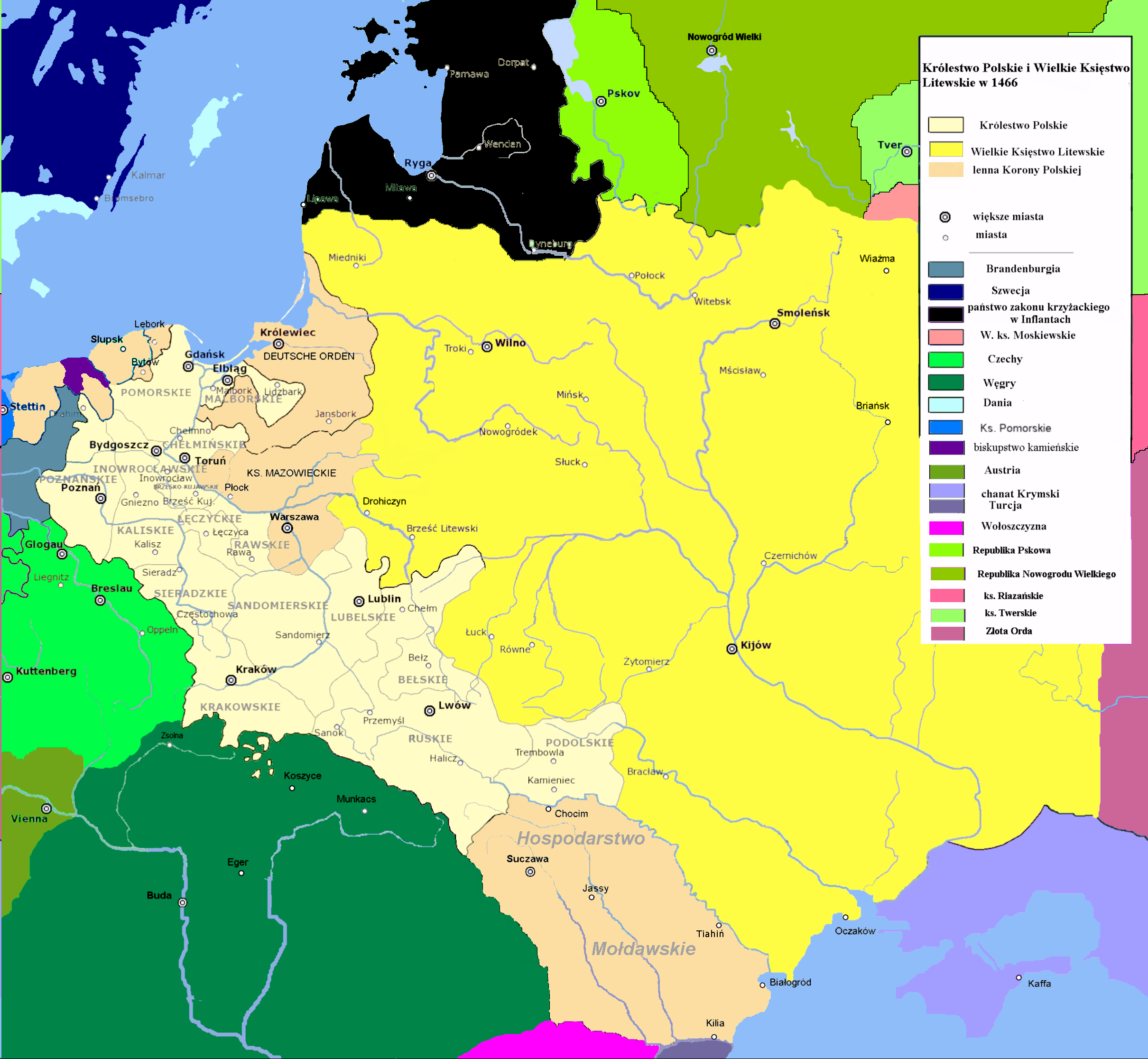
Map of Poland and Lithuania around 1466, with visible Polish–Lithuanian border

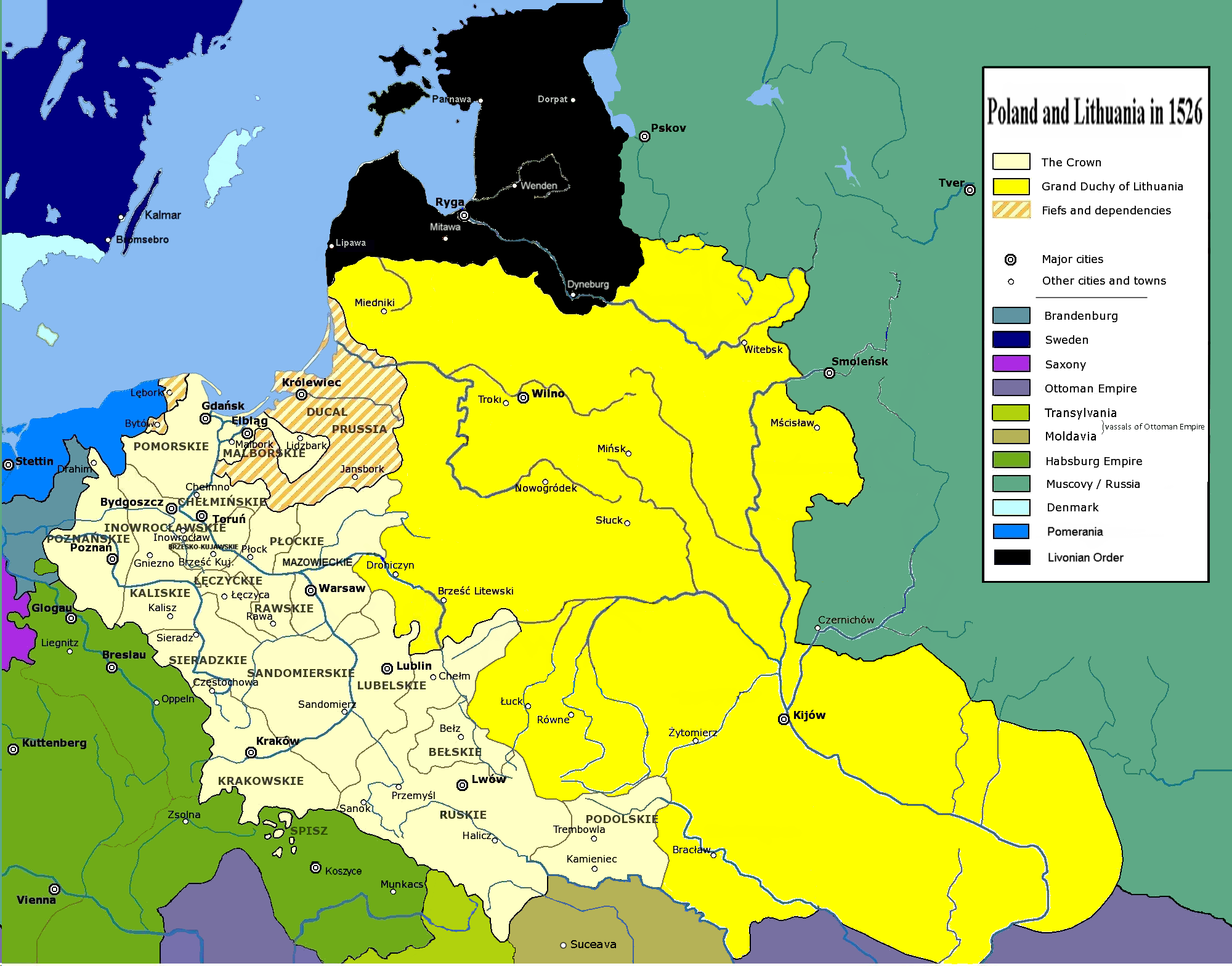
Map of Poland and Lithuania around 1526, with visible Polish–Lithuanian border

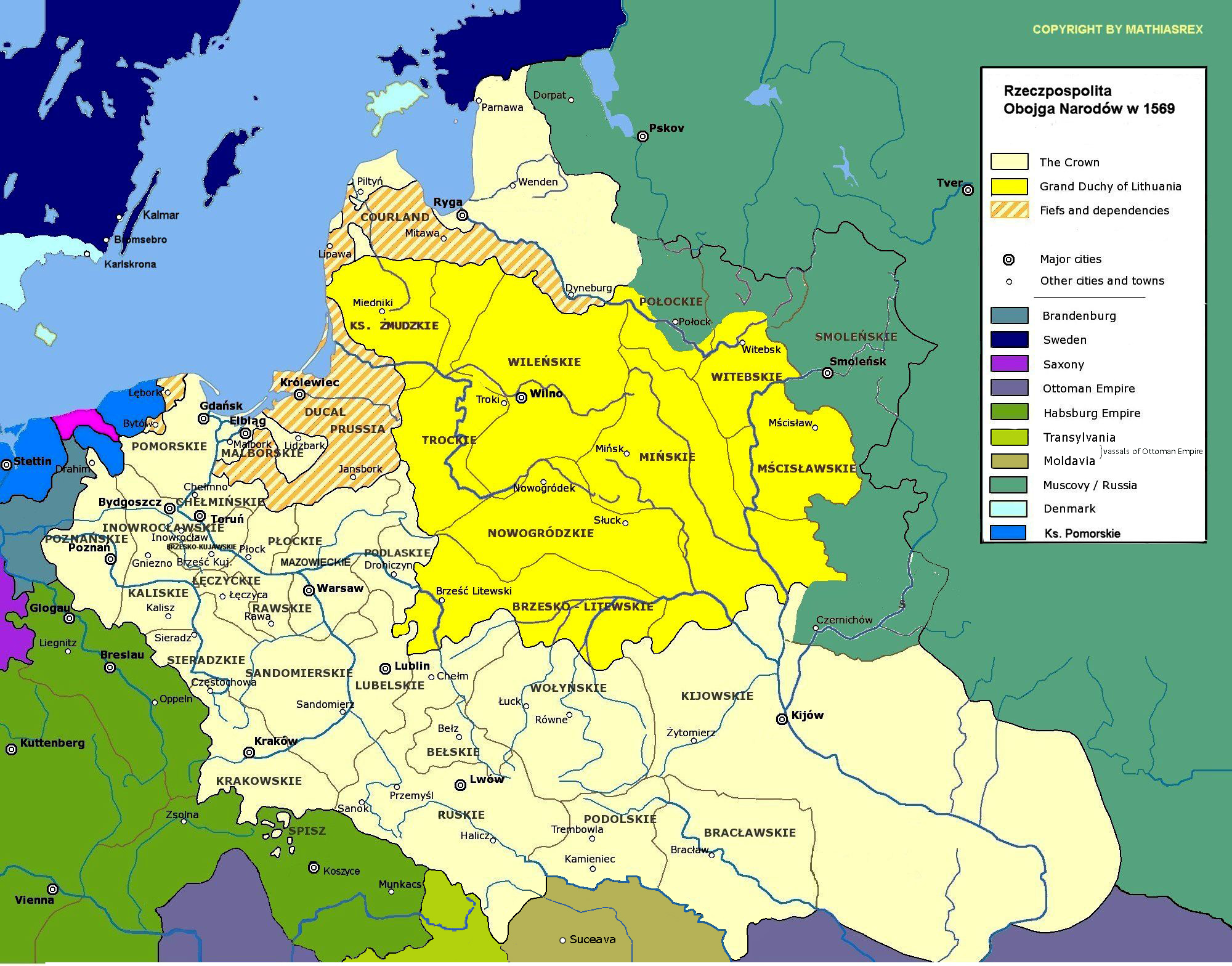
Map of Polish-Lithuania Commonwealth after its formation in 1569, with visible Polish–Lithuanian border. Ukrainian territories were transferred under the administrative control of the Crown of Poland.

Map of Lithuania around 1867–1914, with visible Polish–Russian border (Lithuania did not exist at that time)

Selected lines of demarcation between Lithuania and Poland, 1919–1939. Light orange line denotes the line drawn by the Suwałki Agreement.
