= Puńsk =

Puńsk Punskas
- Village
- Church of the Assumption in Puńsk
- Interactive map of Puńsk
- Location within Poland
- Coordinates: 54°15′N 23°10′E
- Country: Poland
- Voivodeship: Podlaskie
- County: Sejny
- Gmina: Puńsk
- Time zone: UTC+1 (CET)
  - Summer (DST): UTC+2 (CEST)
- Postal code: 16-515
- Vehicle registration: BSE

Puńsk ([puɲsk]; Lithuanian: Punskas) is a village in the Podlaskie Voivodeship in northeastern Poland, seat of the Gmina Puńsk in the Sejny County. It is located 5 km (3.1 mi) from the border with Lithuania.

== History ==
=== Prehistory ===
The oldest traces of humans in Puńsk territory date back to about 10,000 years BC.

=== Middle Ages ===
In the early Middle Ages it was inhabited by the Baltic Yotvingians.

In the 13th century, the Teutonic Knights mostly exterminated the local Balts with only few of them surviving. Nowadays only some castle hills (e.g. in Szurpiły), mounds (e.g. in Jegliniec), cemeteries (e.g. in Szwajcaria), village names (e.g. Żyrwiny, Krosna) and archaeological excavations remind us about their existence. Later on the Suwałki Region became overgrown with forests. Lithuanian Grand Dukes hunted there. In the early 15th century the people from Merkinė and Punia started to colonize this territory again. The lake was named Punia, from which the village derived its name. Initially, it might have been called Puniškės after Punia, which over time became Puńsk. It was one of the first settlements in this territory.

=== Modern era ===
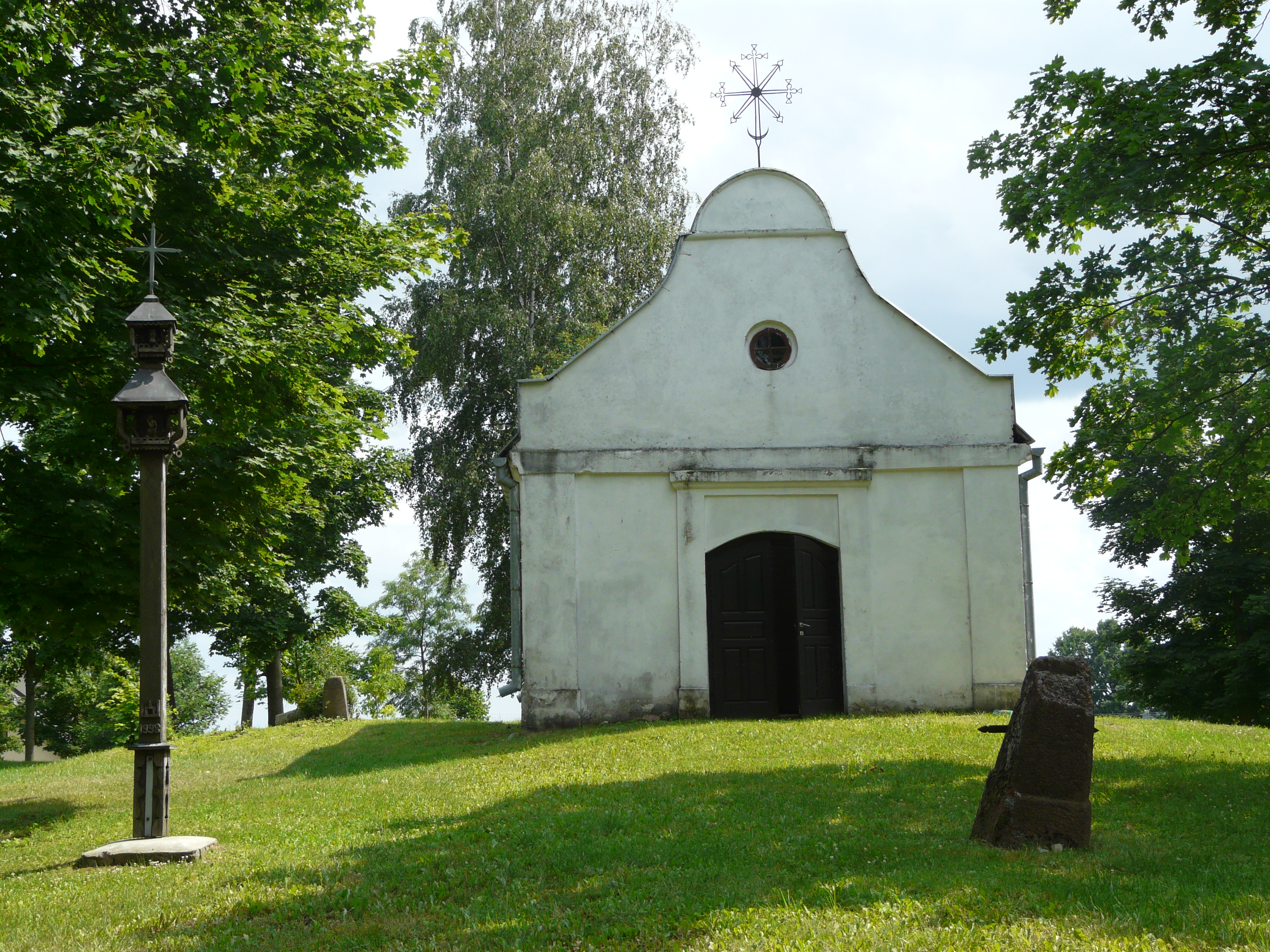
Puńsk Cemetery Chapel

In 1597, the Sejwy forester, Stanisław Zaliwski built the church in Puńsk, and the Catholic parish was established. Later on the Lithuanian chancellery published the document of the king Sigismund I the Old, which stated that Puńsk's parish priest can only be a Lithuanian-speaking person.

In 1647, the king Władysław IV Vasa approved Puńsk's town rights according to the Magdeburg rights and gave it a coat of arms with Saint Peter's image. At that time the parish of Puńsk belonged to the Diocese of Vilnius, and later (from 1795) to the bishopric of Wigry. There was a school and a hospital by the church.

In 1795, there lived 583 people in Puńsk and 748 people were registered in 1827.

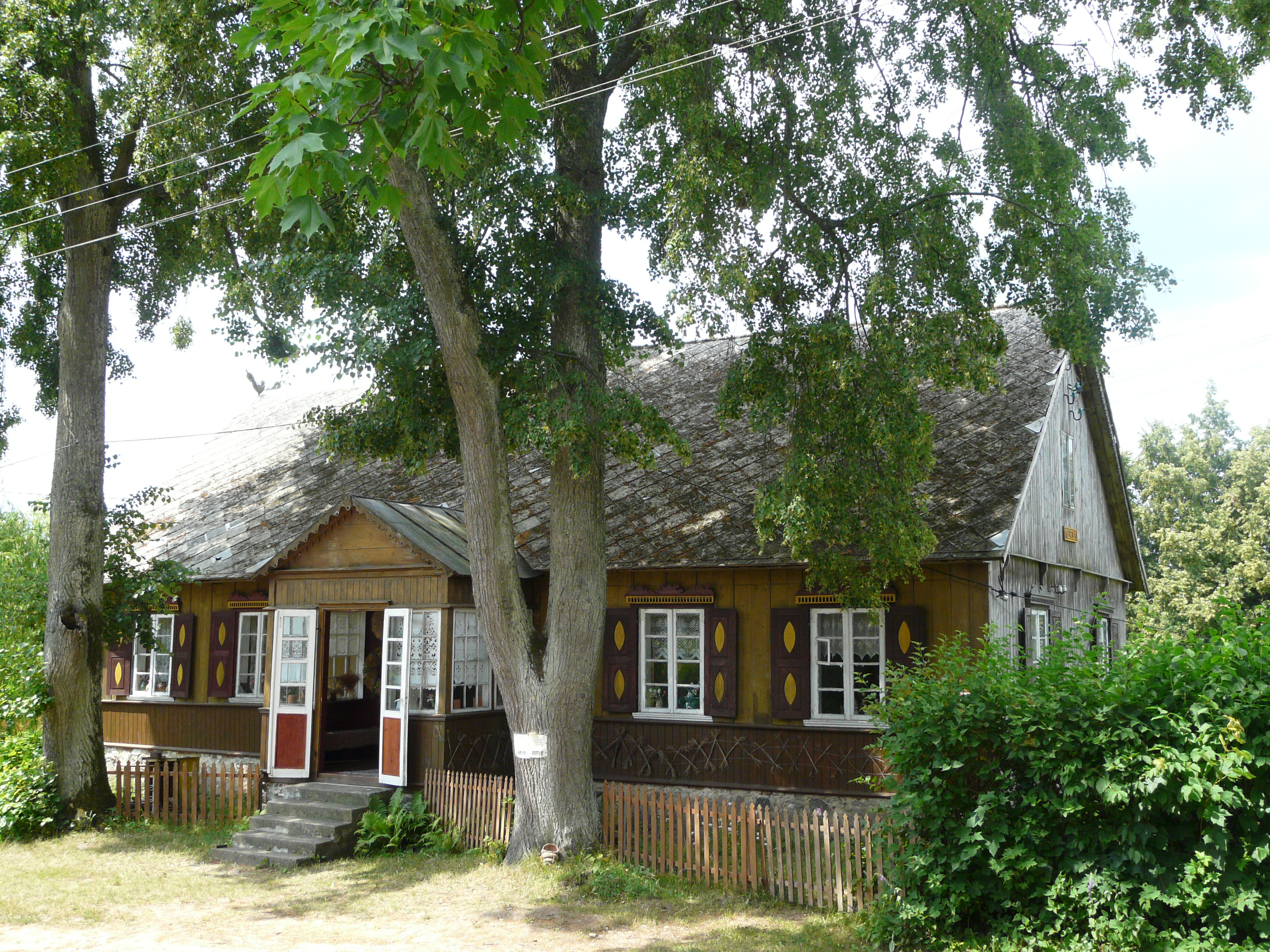
Old rectory in Puńsk

Puńsk was annexed by Prussia in the Third Partition of Poland in 1795. In 1807 it became part of the short-lived Polish Duchy of Warsaw, within which it was administratively located in the Łomża Department. After the duchy's dissolution in 1815, it became part of Congress Poland, soon forcibly integrated into the Russian Empire.

In 1827, Puńsk had 748 inhabitants. In 1852 Puńsk lost its town rights. In 1881, there lived 1,200 people in the whole parish. Then the parish of Puńsk was divided into three separate units: in Smolany, Becejły and Puńsk. In 1910, there were 74 villages with 7,044 people that belonged to the parish of Puńsk.

People of Puńsk area suffered from the Tsarist repressions. There were secret schools. The illegal Lithuanian press and books were secretly transferred across the German-Russian border by the book smugglers (knygnešiai). Povilas Matulevičius was the most famous book smugglers in the region.

=== Interwar period ===
After World War I, when both Lithuania and Poland regained independence, there were fights between them over the Suwałki Region. In April 1919 Puńsk and its territory became a part of Poland. The border has remained unchanged since the summer of 1920.

Similarly to the situation in other disputed areas, including the Vilnius region, a referendum which would determine which country the inhabitants of Puńsk wanted to belong to was not held.

As part of Poland, new local regulations were introduced by the government, and Lithuanians were repressed by them. During the interwar period, there were several active societies, for example St. Casimir's Society dealt with the matters of church, Rytas maintained schools, and Talka was a co-operative society. The vast majority of commerce and business belonged to Jews. They made up the greater part of Puńsk inhabitants at that time. Some extant old houses, the building of synagogue and a big cemetery nearby Puńsk remind of their former presence.

Many Jews emigrated. One such family was Rafalin. David Rafalin, a graduate of the Slobodka Yeshiva, became a rabbi in Cuba in 1929, then in 1933, he moved to Mexico, where he was a rabbi for 46 years. In 1931, most of the Jewish section of Puńsk was destroyed by a fire.

=== World War II ===
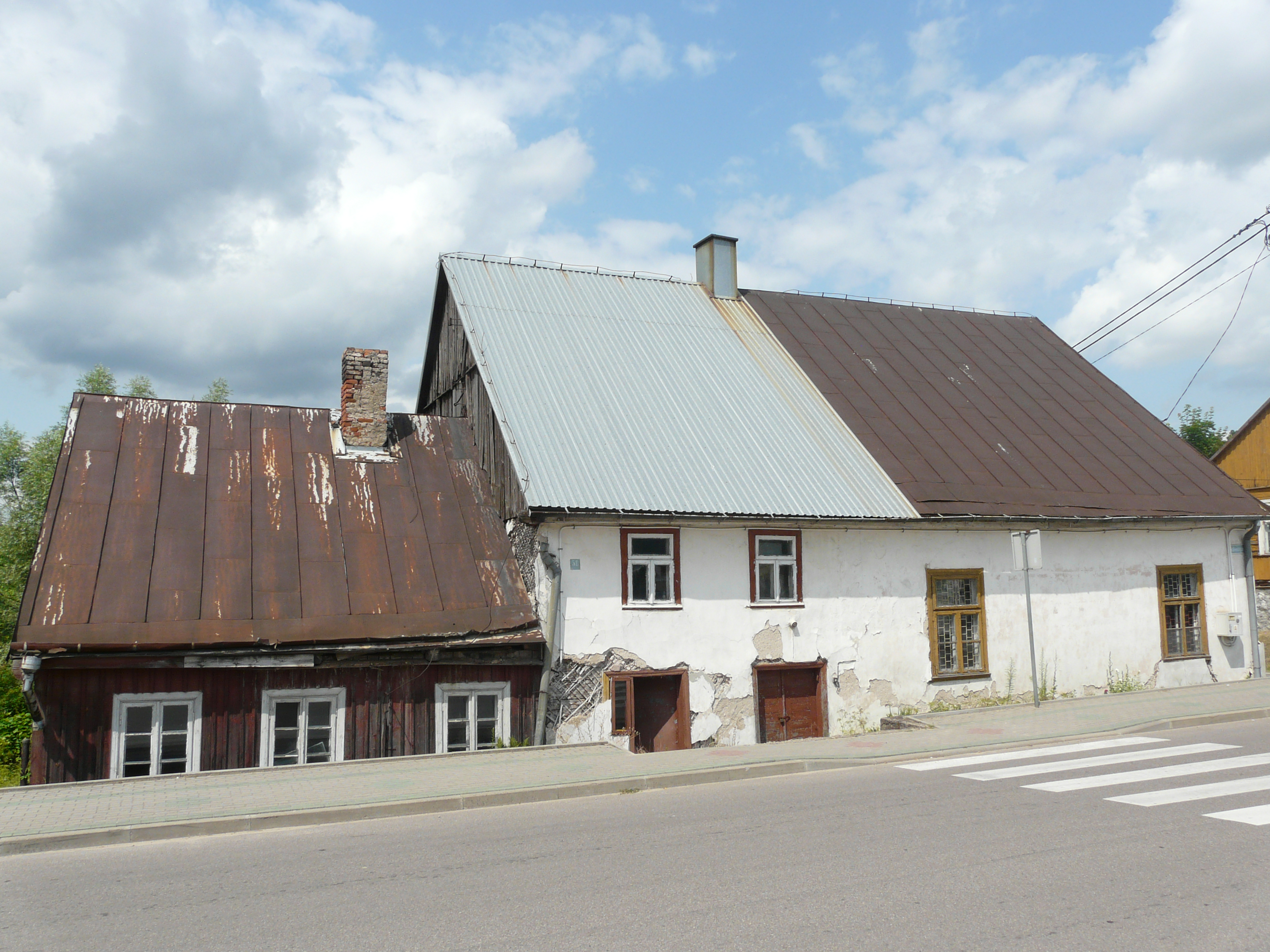
Former synagogue of Puńsk

During World War II, Puńsk was occupied by Germany, who incorporated it directly into the province of East Prussia. The invaders started to introduce a new order. It was decided to make a clean sweep of undesirable people in the Suwałki Region. The unsuitable ones for Germanisation were killed and the favourable ones had been left to become assimilated. It was also decided to colonize this area and populate it with Germans in accordance with the Lebensraum policy, and resettle many indigenous Lithuanians to Lithuania, which was then occupied by the Russians. According to the agreement between Germany and the Soviet Union on 10 January 1941, about 70% of people were expelled from the territory. Most of them returned after the German occupation ended.

In Yad Vashem's Central Database of Shoah (Holocaust) Victims, more than six dozen Jewish inhabitants of Puńsk are listed as being murdered during World War II. Some were killed in the village itself, while others were deported to camps and ghettos in German-occupied Poland and neighboring Lithuania.

With the end of German occupation, the village was restored to Poland, although with a Soviet-installed communist regime, which remained in power until the Fall of Communism in the 1980s.

=== Contemporary history ===
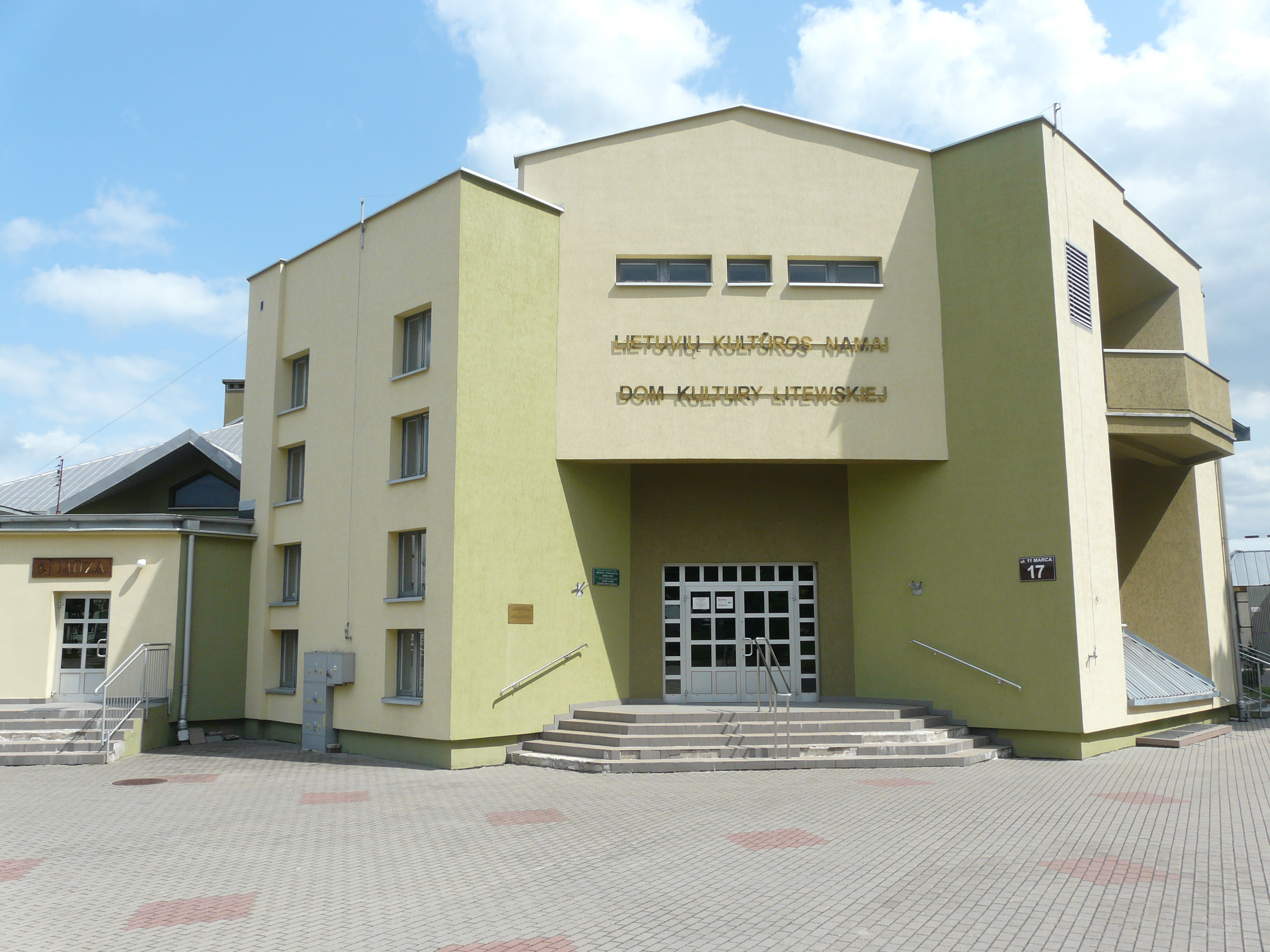
Lithuanian House of Culture

After the war Lithuanian social and cultural life in this region became more active again. In 1956, there was established LVKD (The Social and Cultural Association of Lithuanians). Its task was to weld Lithuanians who were scattered not only in the Suwałki Region but all over Poland. Lithuanian schools and cultural centre were established. The ensembles of the Lithuanian Culture Centre in Puńsk perform in Poland and abroad. These are the Jotva choreographic ensemble (established in 1951), the Klumpė folk band (1956), the Dzūkija choir (1957), and a barn theatre group.

The important role in propagation of national awareness is played by the Publishing House and its periodical Aušra.

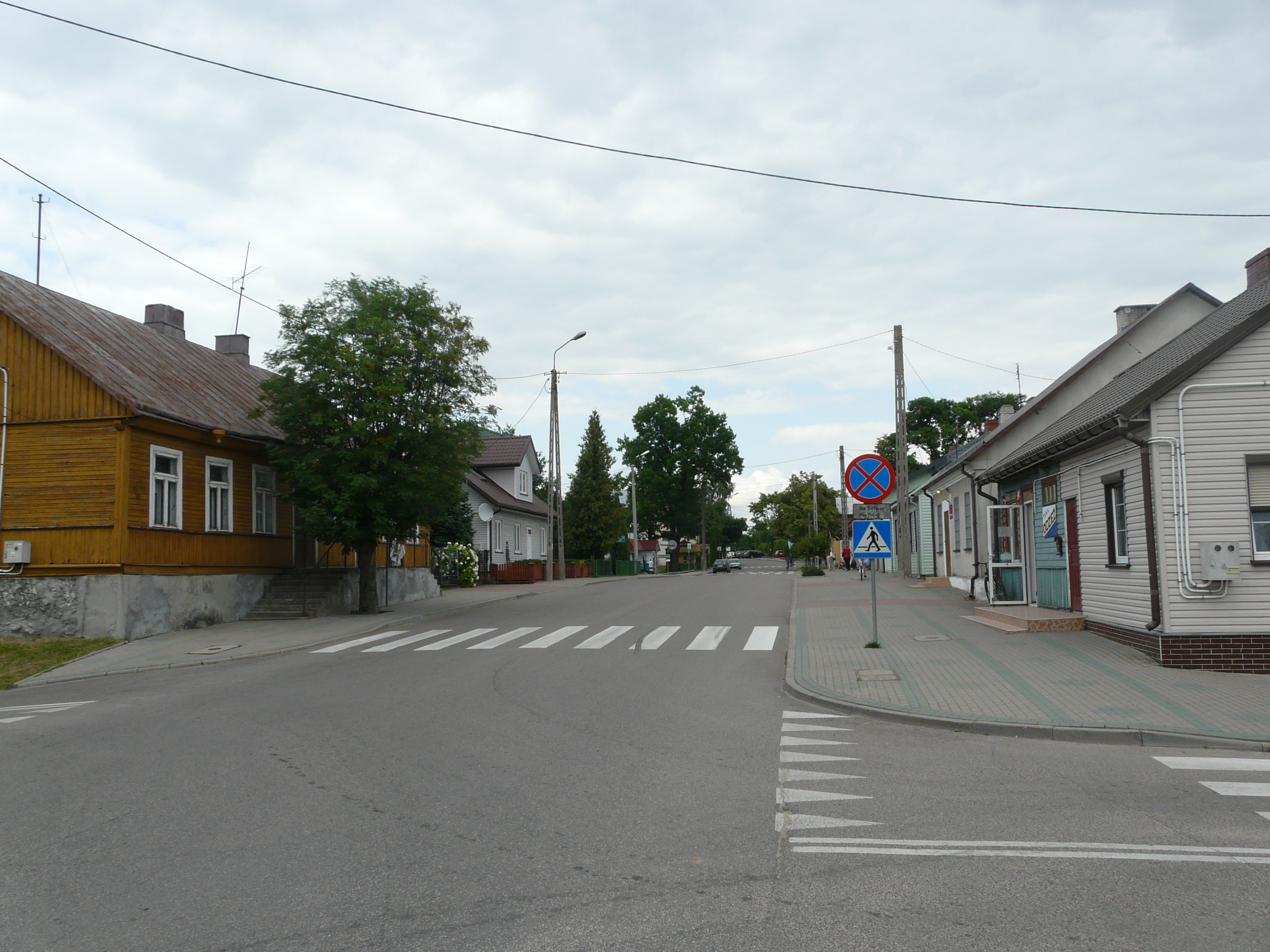
Adam Mickiewicz Street

The Puńsk impact crater on Mars was named after the village in 1976.

In 1993, LLB (Lithuanian Society in Poland) was established. One year later its offshoot - Lithuanian Youth Society was created. These organizations connect all of Lithuanians and represent their interests in and out of country.

In 1994, Poland and Lithuania signed an agreement about friendship and neighbourly cooperation. New possibilities have appeared in order to communicate with Poland.

== Demographics ==
According to the census of 2021, it had a population of 1,352. Over 75% of the population of Puńsk is Lithuanian. With Lithuanian Culture House, Lithuanian high school and print house, Puńsk is the main centre of the Lithuanian minority in Poland.
