= Żwikiele =

Żwikiele Žvikeliai
- Village
- Location within Poland
- Coordinates: 54°12′N 23°15′E
- Country: Poland
- Voivodeship: Podlaskie
- County: Sejny
- Gmina: Puńsk
- Population: 137
- Postal code: 16-515
- Car plates: BSE

Żwikiele ([ʐviˈkʲɛlɛ]; Lithuanian: Žvikeliai) is a village in the administrative district of Gmina Puńsk, within Sejny County, Podlaskie Voivodeship, in north-eastern Poland, close to the border with Lithuania.

== History ==
The village was located at the end of the 18th century in the Grodno district of the Trakai voivodeship in the Grand Duchy of Lithuania.

In 1827 village recorded the population to be numbered at 104 and 16 homes and in 1895 it was numbered at 330 people and 40 homes.

== Sources ==
- VLKK (2002). "Atvirkštinis lietuvių kalboje vartojamų tradicinių Lenkijos vietovardžių formų sąrašas" (PDF). VLKK (in Lithuanian). Archived from the original (PDF) on 2012-02-14.
