= Wiłkopedzie =

Wiłkopedzie Vilkapėdžiai
- Village
- Location within Poland
- Coordinates: 54°11′9″N 23°16′29″E
- Country: Poland
- Voivodeship: Podlaskie
- County: Sejny
- Gmina: Puńsk
- Population: 81
- Postal code: 16-515
- Car plates: BSE

Wiłkopedzie ([viu̯kɔˈpɛd͡ʑɛ]; Lithuanian: Vilkapėdžiai) is a village in the administrative district of Gmina Puńsk, within Sejny County, Podlaskie Voivodeship, in north-eastern Poland, close to the border with Lithuania.

== Geography ==
The village is located in the East Suwałki Lake District north of Lake Szejpiszki in the Protected Landscape Area on the Dziedulka River, a tributary of the Marycha River.

== History ==
In 1827 it was recorded that the population of the village numbered at 98 and 13 homes and in 1893 it was numbered at 225 people and 22 homes.

From 1957 to 1975, the village was administered as part of the Białystok Voivodeship.

== Transport ==
The village is located on the Sejny Land cycle trail Rygol - Zaboryszki leading through undulating, forested areas of the lake district in the borderland largely inhabited by Lithuanians; on the trail there are numerous monuments of Lithuanian folk architecture.

== Sources ==
- VLKK (2002). "Atvirkštinis lietuvių kalboje vartojamų tradicinių Lenkijos vietovardžių formų sąrašas" (PDF). VLKK (in Lithuanian). Archived from the original (PDF) on 2012-02-14.
