= Boksze-Osada =

Boksze-Osada Bokšiai
- Village
- Location within Poland
- Coordinates: 54°11′9″N 23°11′40″E
- Country: Poland
- Voivodeship: Podlaskie
- County: Sejny
- Gmina: Puńsk

Population
  - Total: 22
- Postal code: 16-515
- Car plates: BSE

Boksze-Osada ([ˈbɔkʂɛ ɔˈsada]; Lithuanian: Bokšiai) is a village in the administrative district of Gmina Puńsk, within Sejny County, Podlaskie Voivodeship, in north-eastern Poland, close to the border with Lithuania.

Jewish poet Morris Rosenfeld was born in Boksze-Osada.

== Geography ==
Boksze-Osada lies on Lake Boksze. It is a post-glacial, trough lake arranged in a meridional direction. A road from Becejł to Smolany runs along the north-eastern shore. The lake is fed by several streams. One of them enters from the north direction, flowing on the way through Lake Bobruczek, which is a nature reserve of the same name.

== History ==
The first mention of Boksze-Osada is from inventory of forestry goods in 1639. At that time, the village, located on the south-western shore of Lake Sejwy Czarne (now Boksze), consisted of seven fibres and was inhabited by eight ploughmen equipped with half-fibres of land. In addition, they received 2 fibres of land, from which they paid an annual rent of 2 kopecks of Lithuanian pennies. The task of the ploughmen was to protect the Merecko-Premyslomsk-Perstunska Forest from further colonisation and destruction of the backwoods and illegal extraction of timber and forest riches.

Today, the former village of Boksze is Boksze Stare and Boksze Osada. It consists of two stream pools separated by a strait.

== Sources ==
- VLKK (2002). "Atvirkštinis lietuvių kalboje vartojamų tradicinių Lenkijos vietovardžių formų sąrašas" (PDF). VLKK (in Lithuanian). Archived from the original (PDF) on 2012-02-14.
