= Wojtokiemie =

Wojtokiemie Vaitakiemis
- Village
- Location within Poland
- Coordinates: 54°13′N 23°13′E
- Country: Poland
- Voivodeship: Podlaskie
- County: Sejny
- Gmina: Puńsk
- Population: 129
- Postal code: 16-515
- Car plates: BSE

Wojtokiemie ([vɔi̯tɔˈkʲɛmjɛ]; Lithuanian: Vaitakiemis) is a village in the administrative district of Gmina Puńsk, within Sejny County, Podlaskie Voivodeship, in north-eastern Poland, close to the border with Lithuania.

== History ==
In 1827 it was recorded that the population of the village numbered at 173 and 29 homes and in 1893 it was numbered at 510 people and 50 homes.

The teacher, ethnographer, and activist for the Lithuanian minority in Poland Aldona Wojciechowska was born in Wojtokiemie in 1952.

== Tourist attractions ==
- homestead no. 3, 3rd quarter of the 19th century:
- wooden house
- wooden pigsty
- wooden granary

== Sources ==
- VLKK (2002). "Atvirkštinis lietuvių kalboje vartojamų tradicinių Lenkijos vietovardžių formų sąrašas" (PDF). VLKK (in Lithuanian). Archived from the original (PDF) on 2012-02-14.
