= Przystawańce =

- Village
- Location within Poland
- Coordinates: 54°15′N 23°17′E
- Country: Poland
- Voivodeship: Podlaskie
- County: Sejny
- Gmina: Puńsk
- Population: 96
- Postal code: 16-515
- Car plates: BSE

Przystawańce ([pʂɨstaˈvaɲt͡sɛ]; Lithuanian: Pristavonys) is a village in the administrative district of Gmina Puńsk, within Sejny County, Podlaskie Voivodeship, in north-eastern Poland, close to the border with Lithuania.

== History ==
In 1827 it was recorded that the population of the village numbered at 108 and 14 homes and in 1888 it was numbered at 218 people and 21 homes.

== Sources ==
- VLKK (2002). "Atvirkštinis lietuvių kalboje vartojamų tradicinių Lenkijos vietovardžių formų sąrašas" (PDF). VLKK (in Lithuanian). Archived from the original (PDF) on 2012-02-14.
