= Polish–Lithuanian =

Polish–Lithuanian can refer to:

- Polish–Lithuanian union (1385–1569)
- Polish–Lithuanian Commonwealth (1569–1795)
- Polish-Lithuanian identity as used to describe groups, families, or individuals with histories in the Polish–Lithuanian Commonwealth
- Lithuania–Poland relations (since 1918)
- Polish minority in Lithuania
- Lithuanian minority in Poland
