= Ogórki =

Ogórki Agurkiai
- Village
- Location within Poland
- Coordinates: 54°14′N 23°15′E
- Country: Poland
- Voivodeship: Podlaskie
- County: Sejny
- Gmina: Puńsk
- Population: 71
- Postal code: 16-515
- Car plates: BSE

Ogórki ([ɔˈɡurki], lit. 'Cucumbers'; Lithuanian: Agurkiai) is a village in the administrative district of Gmina Puńsk, within Sejny County, Podlaskie Voivodeship, in north-eastern Poland, close to the border with Lithuania.

== History ==
In 1827 it was recorded that the population of the village numbered 68 people and 8 homes, and in 1886 it was numbered at 112 people and 13 homes.

According to the Polish census of 1921, the village of Ogórki had 15 houses and 82 inhabitants. At that time, all inhabitants of the village declared Roman Catholicism as their faith. At the same time, the majority of the village inhabitants declared Lithuanian nationality (81 people), the remaining person declared Polish nationality.

== Sources ==
- VLKK (2002). "Atvirkštinis lietuvių kalboje vartojamų tradicinių Lenkijos vietovardžių formų sąrašas" (PDF). VLKK (in Lithuanian). Archived from the original (PDF) on 2012-02-14.
