= Szołtany =

Szołtany Šaltėnai
- Village
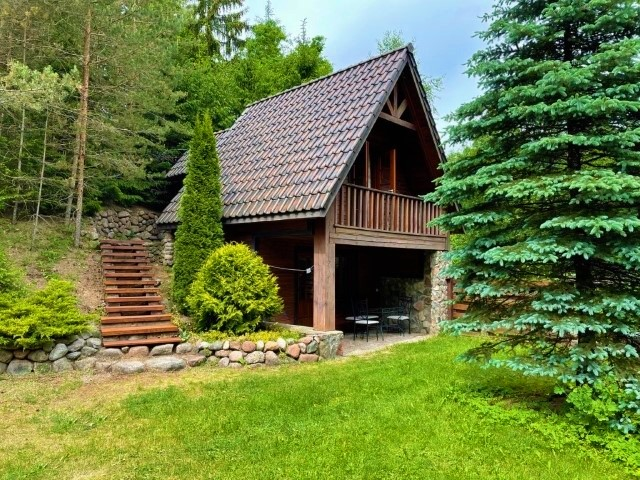

- Location within Poland
- Coordinates: 54°15′N 23°9′E
- Country: Poland
- Voivodeship: Podlaskie
- County: Sejny
- Gmina: Puńsk

Government
  - Village representative: Kamil Robak
- Elevation: 150 m (490 ft)
- Population: 93
- Postal code: 16-515
- Car plates: BSE

Szołtany ([ʂɔu̯ˈtanɨ]; Lithuanian: Šaltėnai) is a village in the administrative district of Gmina Puńsk, within Sejny County, Podlaskie Voivodeship, in north-eastern Poland, close to the border with Lithuania.

Polish farmer and politician Stanisław Lemiesz was born in Szołtany.

== Geography ==
The Marycha river flows through Szołtany. There are three bus stops in the village, one of which is made of hollow blocks and features carved stone columns of Gediminas.

== History ==
The village was established at the turn of the 13th and 14th centuries. Until 1597 Szołtany was called Studencza, when King Sigismund III Vasa changed the name of the village to the present one. In the same year, the king allocated 8 Voloks of land for the maintenance of the Parish of Punsk, and in 1606 - 15 Voloks.

Until the third partition of Poland the village belonged to the Grand Duchy of Lithuania, and thereafter it belonged to the Duchy of Warsaw from 1807 to 1815 until it was annexed by the Russian Empire.

There was a farmstead in Szołtany with 4 houses and 11 inhabitants in the 19th century. In 1827 there were 195 inhabitants in Szołtany, including the incorporated Szołtany Jurisdiction.

After World War I, the lands of the Szołtany Farmstead were distributed to Polish legionaries, during a 1921 census 152 people lived in the village.

From 1919 to 1952 Szołtany administratively belonged to the Gmina Sejwy, while from 1952 to the present it belongs to the Gmina Punsk.

== Sources ==
- VLKK (2002). "Atvirkštinis lietuvių kalboje vartojamų tradicinių Lenkijos vietovardžių formų sąrašas" (PDF). VLKK (in Lithuanian). Archived from the original (PDF) on 2012-02-14.
