= Dowiaciszki =

Dowiaciszki Dievetiškė
- Hamlet
- Location within Poland
- Coordinates: 54°11′32″N 23°19′32″E
- Country: Poland
- Voivodeship: Podlaskie
- County: Sejny
- Gmina: Puńsk
- Population: 60
- Postal code: 16-515
- Car plates: BSE

Dowiaciszki (Lithuanian: Dievetiškė) is a hamlet in the administrative district of Gmina Puńsk, within Sejny County, Podlaskie Voivodeship, in north-eastern Poland, close to the border with Lithuania.

== History ==
In 1889 it was part of Święciański County, the population consisted of 47 people and 6 houses.

== Sources ==
- VLKK (2002). "Atvirkštinis lietuvių kalboje vartojamų tradicinių Lenkijos vietovardžių formų sąrašas" (PDF). VLKK (in Lithuanian). Archived from the original (PDF) on 2012-02-14.
