= Szlinokiemie =

Szlinokiemie Šlynakiemis
- Village
- Location within Poland
- Coordinates: 54°14′N 23°9′E
- Country: Poland
- Voivodeship: Podlaskie
- County: Sejny
- Gmina: Puńsk
- Population: 200
- Postal code: 16-515
- Car plates: BSE

Szlinokiemie ([ʂlinɔˈkʲɛmjɛ]; Lithuanian: Šlynakiemis) is a village in the administrative district of Gmina Puńsk, within Sejny County, Podlaskie Voivodeship, in north-eastern Poland, close to the border with Lithuania.

== History ==
The noble village was located at the end of the 18th century in the Grodno district of the Trakai voivodeship.

In 1827 it was recorded that the population of the village numbered at 276 and 34 homes and in 1890 it was numbered at 417 people and 51 homes.

== Sources ==
- VLKK (2002). "Atvirkštinis lietuvių kalboje vartojamų tradicinių Lenkijos vietovardžių formų sąrašas" (PDF). VLKK (in Lithuanian). Archived from the original (PDF) on 2012-02-14.
