= Nowiniki =

Nowiniki Navinykai
- Village
- Location within Poland
- Coordinates: 54°13′N 23°15′E
- Country: Poland
- Voivodeship: Podlaskie
- County: Sejny
- Gmina: Puńsk
- Population: 66
- Postal code: 16-515
- Car plates: BSE

Nowiniki ([nɔviˈniki]; Lithuanian: Navinykai) is a village in the administrative district of Gmina Puńsk, within Sejny County, Podlaskie Voivodeship, in north-eastern Poland, close to the border with Lithuania.

== History ==
The royal village was located at the end of the 18th century in the Grodno district of the Trakai Voivodeship. In 1827 the population of the village was recorded at 110 with 13 homes which, by 1886, had grown to number 183 with 19 homes.

== Sources ==
- VLKK (2002). "Atvirkštinis lietuvių kalboje vartojamų tradicinių Lenkijos vietovardžių formų sąrašas" (PDF). VLKK (in Lithuanian). Archived from the original (PDF) on 2012-02-14.
