= Rejsztokiemie =

Rejsztokiemie Raistiniai
- Village
- Location within Poland
- Coordinates: 54°12′N 23°13′E
- Country: Poland
- Voivodeship: Podlaskie
- County: Sejny
- Gmina: Puńsk
- Population: 97
- Postal code: 16-515
- Car plates: BSE

Rejsztokiemie ([rɛi̯ʂtɔˈkʲɛmjɛ]; Lithuanian: Raistiniai) is a village in the administrative district of Gmina Puńsk, within Sejny County, Podlaskie Voivodeship, in north-eastern Poland, close to the border with Lithuania.

== History ==
The noble village of the Grodno economy was located at the end of the 18th century in the Grodno district of the Trakai Voivodeship.

In 1888 the population of the village was numbered at 276 people with 37 houses.

== Sources ==
- VLKK (2002). "Atvirkštinis lietuvių kalboje vartojamų tradicinių Lenkijos vietovardžių formų sąrašas" (PDF). VLKK (in Lithuanian). Archived from the original (PDF) on 2012-02-14.
