= Wołyńce, Sejny County =

Wołyńce Valinčiai
- Village
- Location within Poland
- Coordinates: 54°16′N 23°15′E
- Country: Poland
- Voivodeship: Podlaskie
- County: Sejny
- Gmina: Puńsk
- Population: 138
- Postal code: 16-515
- Car plates: BSE

Wołyńce ([vɔˈwɨɲt͡sɛ]; Lithuanian: Valinčiai) is a village in the administrative district of Gmina Puńsk, within Sejny County, Podlaskie Voivodeship, in north-eastern Poland, close to the border with Lithuania.

== History ==
The szlachta village was located at the end of the 18th century in the Grodno district of the Trakai Voivodeship in the Grand Duchy of Lithuania.

In 1827 it was recorded that the population of the village numbered at 134 and 15 homes and in 1893 it was numbered at 407 people and 28 homes.

== Tourist attractions ==
Cellar in farmhouse no. 4 (ex. 6), 2nd half of the 19th century.

== See also ==
- Wołyńce-Kolonia

== Sources ==
- VLKK (2002). "Atvirkštinis lietuvių kalboje vartojamų tradicinių Lenkijos vietovardžių formų sąrašas" (PDF). VLKK (in Lithuanian). Archived from the original (PDF) on 2012-02-14.
