= Pełele =

Pełele Peleliai
- Village
- Location within Poland
- Coordinates: 54°13′N 23°17′E
- Country: Poland
- Voivodeship: Podlaskie
- County: Sejny
- Gmina: Puńsk
- Population: 147
- Postal code: 16-515
- Car plates: BSE

Pełele ([pɛˈwɛlɛ]; Lithuanian: Peleliai) is a village in the administrative district of Gmina Puńsk, within Sejny County, Podlaskie Voivodeship, in north-eastern Poland, close to the border with Lithuania.

== History ==
The noble village was located at the end of the 18th century in the Grodno district of the Trakai Voivodeship

In 1827 it was recorded that the population of the village numbered at 42 and 6 homes and in 1886 it was numbered at 166 people and 21 homes.

In June and July 2001, the filming of Squint Your Eyes took place on an abandoned State Agricultural Farm in Pełele.

== Sources ==
- VLKK (2002). "Atvirkštinis lietuvių kalboje vartojamų tradicinių Lenkijos vietovardžių formų sąrašas" (PDF). VLKK (in Lithuanian). Archived from the original (PDF) on 2012-02-14.
