= Buda Zawidugierska =

Buda Zawidugierska Vidugirių Būda
- Village
- Location within Poland
- Coordinates: 54°14′N 23°21′E
- Country: Poland
- Voivodeship: Podlaskie
- County: Sejny
- Gmina: Puńsk

Population
  - Total: 26
- Postal code: 16-515
- Car plates: BSE

Buda Zawidugierska [ˈbuda zaviduˈɡʲɛrska] (Lithuanian: Vidugirių Būda) is a village in the administrative district of Gmina Puńsk, within Sejny County, Podlaskie Voivodeship, in north-eastern Poland, close to the border with Lithuania.

== History ==
In 1880 the village was a part of Suwalki county, and was listed as Czostków commune. The population was numbered at 21 people and 1 residential home.

== Sources ==
- VLKK (2002). "Atvirkštinis lietuvių kalboje vartojamų tradicinių Lenkijos vietovardžių formų sąrašas" (PDF). VLKK (in Lithuanian). Archived from the original (PDF) on 2012-02-14.
