= Dziedziule =

Dziedziule Didžiuliai
- Village
- Location within Poland
- Coordinates: 54°13′N 23°16′E
- Country: Poland
- Voivodeship: Podlaskie
- County: Sejny
- Gmina: Puńsk
- Population: 53
- Postal code: 16-515
- Car plates: BSE

Dziedziule [d͡ʑɛˈd͡ʑulɛ] (Lithuanian: Didžiuliai) is a village in the administrative district of Gmina Puńsk, within Sejny County, Podlaskie Voivodeship, in north-eastern Poland, close to the border with Lithuania.

== History ==
In 1881 the Village had a population of 107 residents with 8 residential houses.

== Sources ==
- VLKK (2002). "Atvirkštinis lietuvių kalboje vartojamų tradicinių Lenkijos vietovardžių formų sąrašas" (PDF). VLKK (in Lithuanian). Archived from the original (PDF) on 2012-02-14.
