= Skarkiszki =

Skarkiszki Skarkiškiai
- Village
- Location within Poland
- Coordinates: 54°12′N 23°18′E
- Country: Poland
- Voivodeship: Podlaskie
- County: Sejny
- Gmina: Puńsk
- Population: 106
- Postal code: 16-515
- Car plates: BSE

Skarkiszki ([skarˈkiʂki]; Lithuanian: Skarkiškiai) is a village in the administrative district of Gmina Puńsk, within Sejny County, Podlaskie Voivodeship, in north-eastern Poland, close to the border with Lithuania.

== History ==
In 1827 it was recorded that the population of the village numbered at 8 and 1 house and in 1889 it was numbered at 44 people and 8 homes.

== Sources ==
- VLKK (2002). "Atvirkštinis lietuvių kalboje vartojamų tradicinių Lenkijos vietovardžių formų sąrašas" (PDF). VLKK (in Lithuanian). Archived from the original (PDF) on 2012-02-14.
