= Tauroszyszki =

Tauroszyszki Taurusiškė Taurutiškė
- Village
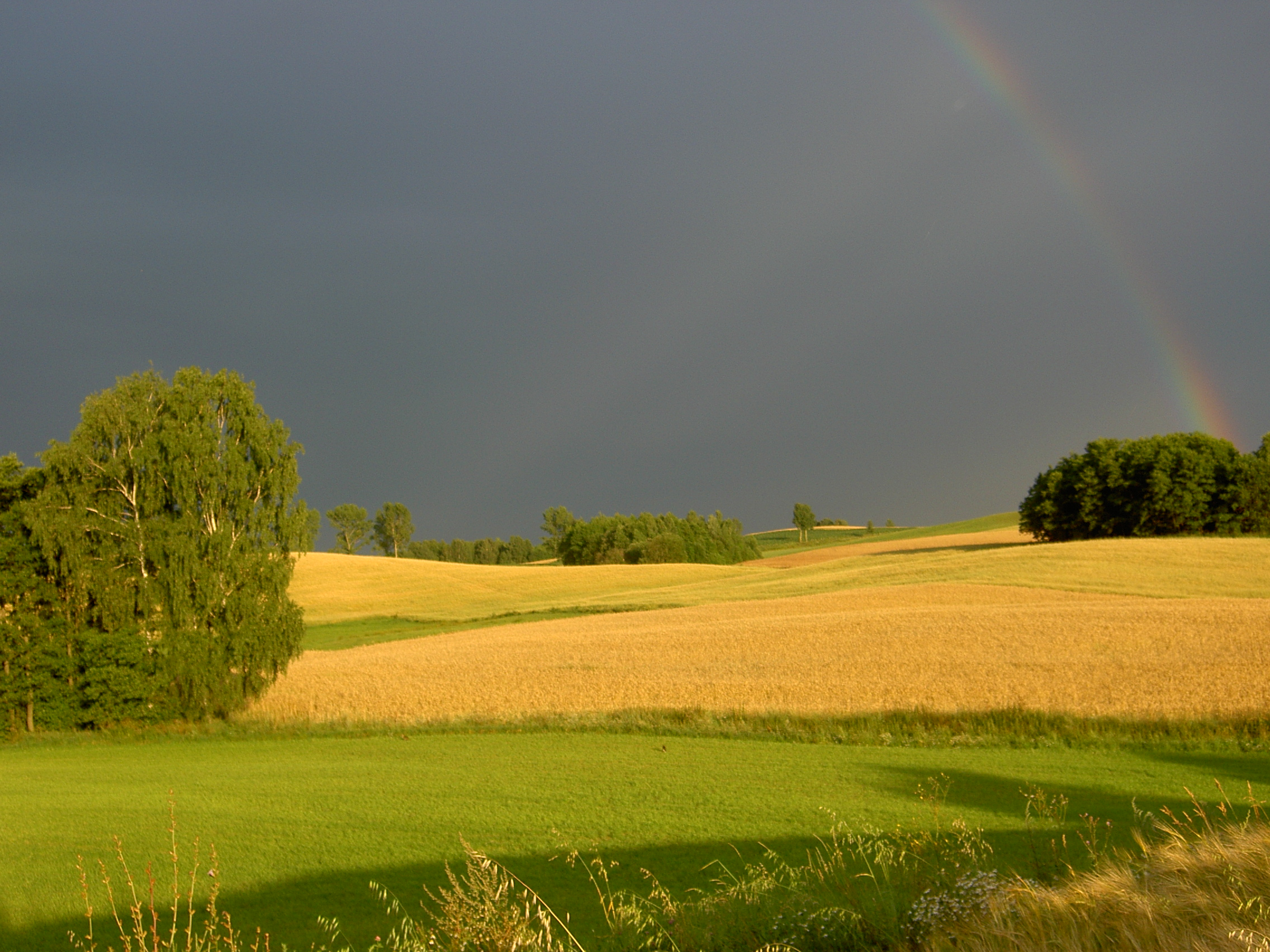

- Location within Poland
- Coordinates: 54°13′38″N 23°18′10″E
- Country: Poland
- Voivodeship: Podlaskie
- County: Sejny
- Gmina: Puńsk
- Population: 51
- Postal code: 16-515
- Car plates: BSE

Tauroszyszki ([tau̯rɔˈʂɨʂki]; Lithuanian: Taurusiškė, Taurutiškė) is a village in the administrative district of Gmina Puńsk, within Sejny County, Podlaskie Voivodeship, in north-eastern Poland, close to the border with Lithuania.

From 1975-1998 the village was administratively governed by the Suwałki Voivodeship.

== History ==
In 1827 it was recorded that the population of the village numbered 12 people and 2 homes, and in 1892 it was numbered at 51 people and 2 homes.

== Tourist attractions ==
Tauroszyszki has a World War I cemetery

== Sources ==
- VLKK (2002). "Atvirkštinis lietuvių kalboje vartojamų tradicinių Lenkijos vietovardžių formų sąrašas" (PDF). VLKK (in Lithuanian). Archived from the original (PDF) on 2012-02-14.
