= Widugiery =

Widugiery Vidugiriai
- Village
- Location within Poland
- Coordinates: 54°12′26″N 23°18′54″E
- Country: Poland
- Voivodeship: Podlaskie
- County: Sejny
- Gmina: Puńsk
- Population: 143
- Postal code: 16-515 \
- Car plates: BSE

Widugiery ([viduˈɡʲɛrɨ]; Lithuanian: Vidugiriai, lit. 'middle of the forest') is a village in the administrative district of Gmina Puńsk, within Sejny County, Podlaskie Voivodeship, in north-eastern Poland, close to the border with Lithuania.

== History ==
The szlachta village was located at the end of the 18th century in the Grodno district of the Trakai voivodeship.

In 1827 it was recorded that the population of the village numbered at 175 and 18 homes and in 1893 it was numbered at 409 people and 43 homes.

== Tourist attractions ==
The village has a wooden granary dating from the latter half of the 19th century.

== Sources ==
- VLKK (2002). "Atvirkštinis lietuvių kalboje vartojamų tradicinių Lenkijos vietovardžių formų sąrašas" (PDF). VLKK (in Lithuanian). Archived from the original (PDF) on 2012-02-14.
