= Vidugiriai =

Vidugiriai is the name of several locations. Its etymology in Lithuanian language is vidus (=inside) + giria (=forest).

- Vidugiriai (Anykščiai), village in Anykščiai District, Lithuania
- Vidugiriai (Pasvalys), village in Pasvalys District, Lithuania
- Lithuanian name of Widugiery, village in Poland, close to the border with Lithuania
