= Oszkinie =

Oszkinie Ožkiniai
- Village
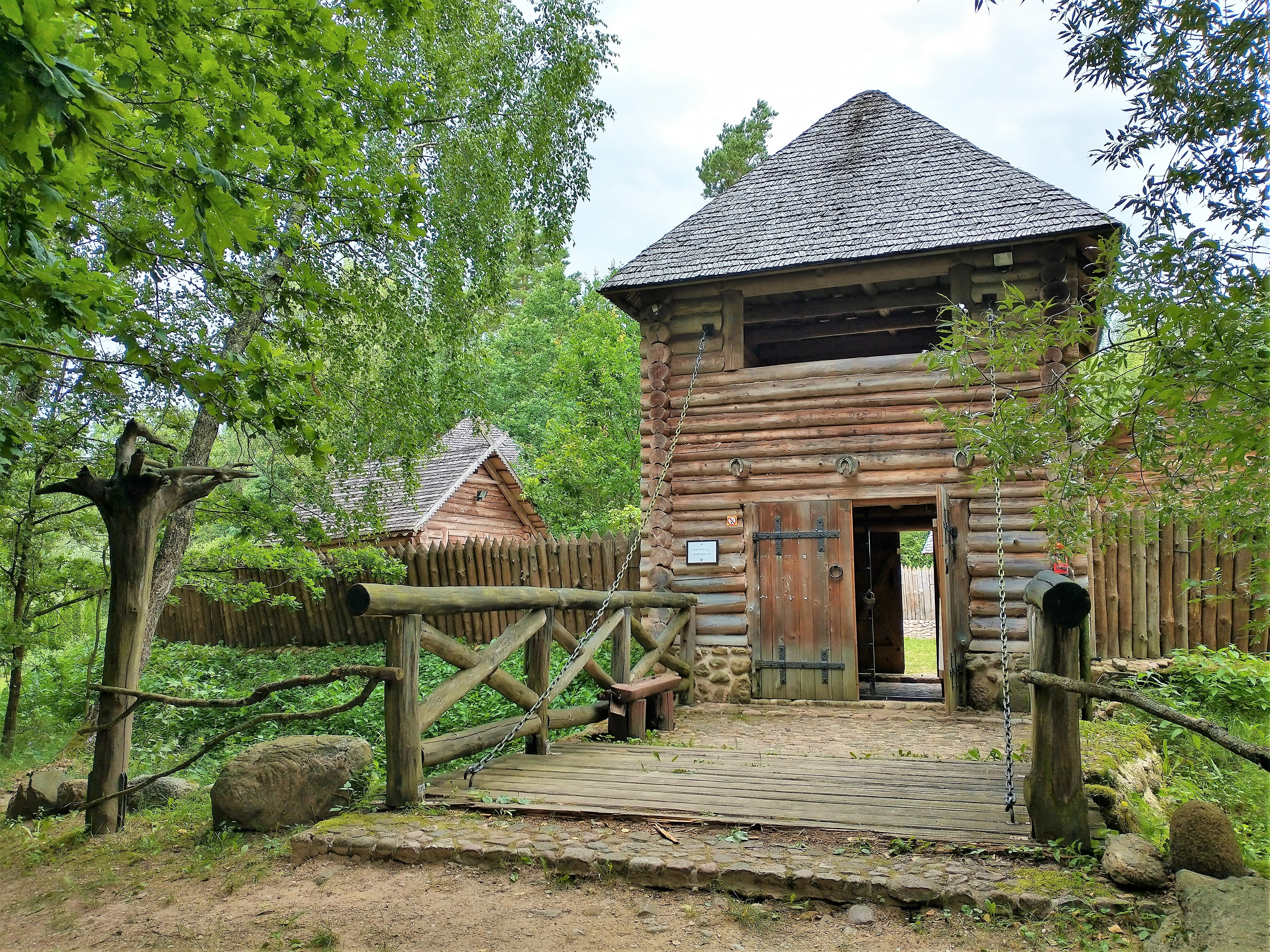
- The entrance to a reconstructed Yotvingian settlement in Oszkinie

- Location within Poland
- Coordinates: 54°14′N 23°11′E
- Country: Poland
- Voivodeship: Podlaskie
- County: Sejny
- Gmina: Puńsk
- Population: 144
- Postal code: 16-515
- Car plates: BSE

Oszkinie ([ɔʂˈkiɲɛ]; Lithuanian: Ožkiniai) is a village in the administrative district of Gmina Puńsk, within Sejny County, Podlaskie Voivodeship, in north-eastern Poland, close to the border with Lithuania.

== History ==
At the end of the 18th century, the szlachta village was located in the Powiat of Grodno in the Trakai Voivodeship.

Whilst part of the Augustów Voivodeship in 1827, the village's population was numbered at 91 with 15 houses. In 1886, whilst part of the Suwałki Governorate, the population had grown to 288 with 35 houses.

== Sources ==
- VLKK (2002). "Atvirkštinis lietuvių kalboje vartojamų tradicinių Lenkijos vietovardžių formų sąrašas" (PDF). VLKK (in Lithuanian). Archived from the original (PDF) on 2012-02-14.
