= Kompocie =

Kompocie Kampuočiai
- Village
- Location within Poland
- Coordinates: 54°14′N 23°15′E
- Country: Poland
- Voivodeship: Podlaskie
- County: Sejny
- Gmina: Puńsk
- Population: 96
- Postal code: 16-515
- Car plates: BSE

Kompocie ([kɔmˈpɔt͡ɕɛ]; Lithuanian: Kampuočiai) is a village in the administrative district of Gmina Puńsk, within Sejny County, Podlaskie Voivodeship, in north-eastern Poland, close to the border with Lithuania.

== History ==
In 1827, it was recorded that the population of the village numbered 157 people with 19 houses, and in 1883 the village numbered a population of 200 and 26 houses
