= Gmina Puńsk =

Gmina Puńsk Puńsk Commune
- Gmina
- Coat of arms

- Gmina Puńsk within the Sejny County
- Coordinates (Puńsk): 54°15′N 23°11′E
- Country: Poland
- Voivodeship: Podlaskie
- County: Sejny
- Seat: Puńsk

Government
  - Mayor: Witold Liszkowski

Area
  - Total: 138.37 km^{2} (53.42 sq mi)

Population (2016)
  - Total: 4,184
  - Density: 30.24/km^{2} (78.32/sq mi)
- Website: http://www.punsk.com.pl

Gmina Puńsk is a rural gmina (administrative district) in Sejny County, Podlaskie Voivodeship, in north-eastern Poland, on the Lithuanian border. Its seat is the village of Puńsk, which lies approximately 20 kilometres (12 mi) north-west of Sejny and 126 km (78 mi) north of the regional capital Białystok. The current mayor of Gmina Puńsk is Witold Liszkowski (Vytautas Liškauskas).

The gmina covers an area of 138.37 square kilometres (53.4 sq mi), and as of 2016 its total population was 4,184. It is a bilingual district, with about 73.4% of the population belonging to the Lithuanian minority in Poland (the 2011 Census).

== Villages ==
Gmina Puńsk contains the villages and settlements of Boksze-Osada, Buda Zawidugierska, Buraki, Dowiaciszki, Dziedziule, Giłujsze, Kalinowo, Kompocie, Krejwiany, Nowiniki, Ogórki, Oszkinie, Pełele, Poluńce, Przystawańce, Puńsk, Rejsztokiemie, Sankury, Sejwy, Skarkiszki, Smolany, Stare Boksze, Szlinokiemie, Szołtany, Tauroszyszki, Trakiszki, Trompole, Widugiery, Wiłkopedzie, Wojciuliszki, Wojtokiemie, Wołyńce and Żwikiele.

== Neighbouring gminas ==
Gmina Puńsk is bordered by the gminas of Krasnopol, Sejny and Szypliszki. It also borders Lithuania.
