= Poluńce =

Poluńce Paliūnai
- Village
- Location within Poland
- Coordinates: 54°15′N 23°19′E
- Country: Poland
- Voivodeship: Podlaskie
- County: Sejny
- Gmina: Puńsk
- Population: 96
- Postal code: 16-515
- Car plates: BSE

Poluńce ([pɔˈluɲt͡sɛ]; Lithuanian: Paliūnai) is a village in the administrative district of Gmina Puńsk, within Sejny County, Podlaskie Voivodeship, in north-eastern Poland, close to the border with Lithuania.

== History ==
In the Inter-war period a guard post of the Border Protection Corps was stationed here.

== Sources ==
- VLKK (2002). "Atvirkštinis lietuvių kalboje vartojamų tradicinių Lenkijos vietovardžių formų sąrašas" (PDF). VLKK (in Lithuanian). Archived from the original (PDF) on 2012-02-14.
