= Trompole =

Trompole Trumpalis
- Village
- Location within Poland
- Coordinates: 54°14′N 23°11′E
- Country: Poland
- Voivodeship: Podlaskie
- County: Sejny
- Gmina: Puńsk
- Postal code: 16-515
- Car plates: BSE

Trompole ([trɔmˈpɔlɛ]; Lithuanian: Trumpalis) is a village in the administrative district of Gmina Puńsk, within Sejny County, Podlaskie Voivodeship, in north-eastern Poland, close to the border with Lithuania.

To the south of the village there is a lake called Trompole.

== History ==
In 1827 it was recorded that the population of the village numbered at 120 and 12 homes and in 1892 it was numbered at 163 people and 20 homes.

== Tourist Attractions ==
Homestead No. 1, 1931-1939:

- wooden house
- wooden granary
- wooden barn
- pigsty
- clay cellar

== Sources ==
- VLKK (2002). "Atvirkštinis lietuvių kalboje vartojamų tradicinių Lenkijos vietovardžių formų sąrašas" (PDF). VLKK (in Lithuanian). Archived from the original (PDF) on 2012-02-14.
