= Sejwy =

Sejwy Seivas
- Village
- Location within Poland
- Coordinates: 54°12′35″N 23°11′33″E
- Country: Poland
- Voivodeship: Podlaskie
- County: Sejny
- Gmina: Puńsk
- Population: 66
- Postal code: 16-515
- Car plates: BSE

Sejwy ([ˈsɛi̯vɨ]; Lithuanian: Seivas) is a village in the administrative district of Gmina Puńsk, within Sejny County, Podlaskie Voivodeship, in north-eastern Poland, close to the border with Lithuania.

== History ==
The royal village of the Grodno economy was located at the end of the 18th century in the Grodno district of the Trakai Voivodeship.

In 1827 it was recorded that the population of the village numbered at 56 and 3 homes and in 1889 it was numbered at 39 people and 10 homes.

In the period of the Second Republic of Poland, Colonel Włodzimierz Wołkowicki became a military settler in the Sejwy.

Until 1952 the village was the seat of the Sejwy gmina, Białystok Voivodeship (1944–1975).

== Sources ==
- VLKK (2002). "Atvirkštinis lietuvių kalboje vartojamų tradicinių Lenkijos vietovardžių formų sąrašas" (PDF). VLKK (in Lithuanian). Archived from the original (PDF) on 2012-02-14.
