= Trakiszki =

Trakiszki Trakiškė Trakiškiai
- Village
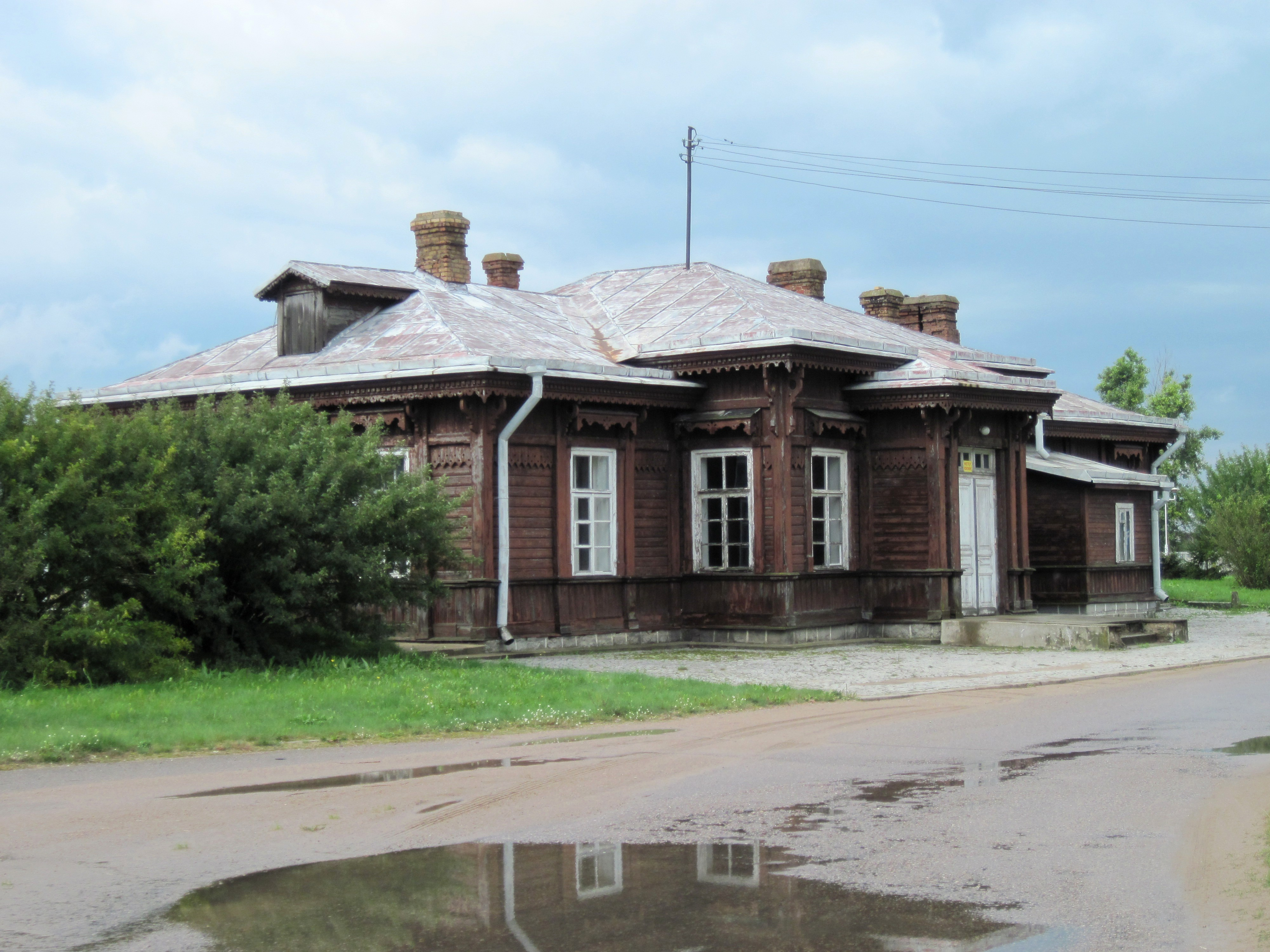
- The exterior of the village's railway station

- Location within Poland
- Coordinates: 54°15′N 23°12′E
- Country: Poland
- Voivodeship: Podlaskie
- County: Sejny
- Gmina: Puńsk
- Population: 91
- Postal code: 16-515
- Car plates: BSE

Trakiszki ([traˈkiʂki]; Lithuanian: Trakiškė, Trakiškiai) is a village in the administrative district of Gmina Puńsk, within Sejny County, Podlaskie Voivodeship, in north-eastern Poland, close to the border with Lithuania.

== History ==
The szlachta village located at the end of the 18th century in the Grodno district of the Trakai voivodeship in the Grand Duchy of Lithuania.

In 1827 it was recorded that the population of the village numbered at 68 and 8 homes and in 1892 it was numbered at 148 people and 21 homes.

According to the First General Population Census of 1921, the village of Trakiszki had 26 houses and 122 inhabitants. At that time, all inhabitants of the village declared the Roman Catholic religion. At the same time, most of the inhabitants of the village declared Lithuanian nationality (113 people), the rest declared Polish nationality (9 people).

== Tourist attractions ==
The village has a wooden railway station that was built in 1896.

== Transport ==
Trakiszki has a railway station along the rail line connecting Poland's standard gauge network with Lithuania's Russian gauge system.

== Notable people ==
- Juozas Ambrazevičius; collaborationist who served as the Prime Minister of the Provisional Government of Lithuania.

== Sources ==
- VLKK (2002). "Atvirkštinis lietuvių kalboje vartojamų tradicinių Lenkijos vietovardžių formų sąrašas" (PDF). VLKK (in Lithuanian). Archived from the original (PDF) on 2012-02-14.
