= Kalinowo, Sejny County =

Kalinowo Kalinavas
- Village
- Location within Poland
- Coordinates: 54°15′45″N 23°8′50″E
- Country: Poland
- Voivodeship: Podlaskie
- County: Sejny
- Gmina: Puńsk
- Population: 36
- Postal code: 16-411
- Car plates: BSE

Kalinowo ([kaliˈnɔvɔ]; Lithuanian: Kalinavas) is a village in the administrative district of Gmina Puńsk, within Sejny County, Podlaskie Voivodeship, in north-eastern Poland, close to the border with Lithuania.
