= Krejwiany, Sejny County =

Krejwiany Kreivėnai
- Village
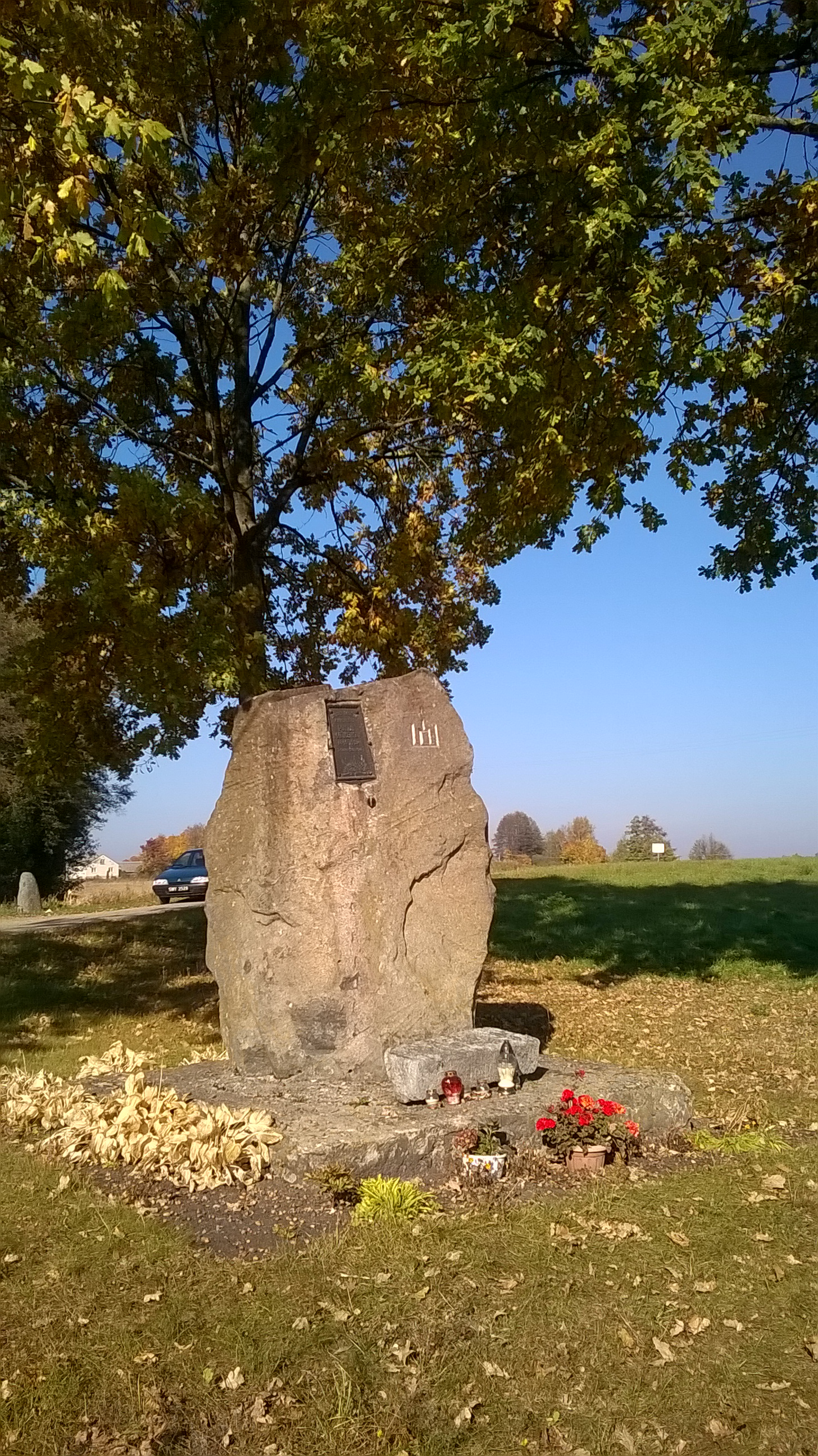
- A stone erected in the village to honour a local smuggler

- Location within Poland
- Coordinates: 54°15′31″N 23°11′42″E
- Country: Poland
- Voivodeship: Podlaskie
- County: Sejny
- Gmina: Puńsk
- Population: 161
- Postal code: 16-515
- Car plates: BSE

Krejwiany ([krɛi̯ˈvjanɨ]; Lithuanian: Kreivėnai) is a village in the administrative district of Gmina Puńsk, within Sejny County, Podlaskie Voivodeship, in north-eastern Poland, close to the border with Lithuania.

== History ==
In 1827 the village population numbered 19 with 27 homes and in 1883 it the population numbered 230 with 31 homes.

In the inter-war period a guard post of the Border Protection Corps was stationed here.

== Sources ==
- VLKK (2002). "Atvirkštinis lietuvių kalboje vartojamų tradicinių Lenkijos vietovardžių formų sąrašas" (PDF). VLKK (in Lithuanian). Archived from the original (PDF) on 2012-02-14.
