= Giłujsze =

Village in Gmina Puńsk, Poland

Giłujsze Giluišiai
- Village
- Interactive map of Giłujsze
- Location within Poland
- Coordinates: 54°17′21″N 23°11′8″E
- Country: Poland
- Voivodeship: Podlaskie
- County: Sejny
- Gmina: Puńsk
- Population: 39
- Postal code: 16-411
- Car plates: BSE

Giłujsze ([ɡiˈwui̯ʂɛ]; Lithuanian: Giluišiai) is a village in the administrative district of Gmina Puńsk, within Sejny County, Podlaskie Voivodeship, in north-eastern Poland, close to the border with Lithuania.

== History ==
In 1881 the Villages population was numbered at 160 people and 22 residential houses.

According to the First General Population Census of 1921, the village of Gilujsze had 9 houses and 46 inhabitants. At that time, all inhabitants of the village declared Roman Catholicism as their religion and Lithuanian nationality. In the interwar period, Giłujsze was located in the municipality of Andrzejewo.

== Sources ==
- VLKK (2002). "Atvirkštinis lietuvių kalboje vartojamų tradicinių Lenkijos vietovardžių formų sąrašas" (PDF). VLKK (in Lithuanian). Archived from the original (PDF) on 2012-02-14.
