= Sankury =

Sankury Sankūrai
- Village
- Location within Poland
- Coordinates: 54°14′N 23°21′E
- Country: Poland
- Voivodeship: Podlaskie
- County: Sejny
- Gmina: Puńsk
- Population: 37
- Postal code: 16-515
- Car plates: BSE

Sankury ([saŋˈkurɨ]; Lithuanian: Sankūrai) is a village in the administrative district of Gmina Puńsk, within Sejny County, Podlaskie Voivodeship, in north-eastern Poland, close to the border with Lithuania.

A WOP watchtower was stationed in Sankury.

== History ==
In 1827 it was recorded that the population of the village numbered at 64 and 6 homes and in 1890 it was numbered at 82 people and 8 homes.
