= Buraki, Poland =

Buraki Burokai
- Village
- Location within Poland
- Coordinates: 54°15′24″N 23°15′13″E
- Country: Poland
- Voivodeship: Podlaskie
- County: Sejny
- Gmina: Puńsk
- Population: 44
- Postal code: 16-515
- Car plates: BSE

Buraki [buˈraki] (Lithuanian: Burokai) is a village in the administrative district of Gmina Puńsk, within Sejny County, Podlaskie Voivodeship, in north-eastern Poland, close to the border with Lithuania.

== History ==
The village was located at the end of the 18th century in the Grodno district of the Trakai Voivodeship.

In 1827, the village population numbered 68, with 9 residential homes. In 1880, it was a part of the Trakai County with a population of 26 homes and 219 people.

== Sources ==
- VLKK (2002). "Atvirkštinis lietuvių kalboje vartojamų tradicinių Lenkijos vietovardžių formų sąrašas" (PDF). VLKK (in Lithuanian). Archived from the original (PDF) on 2012-02-14.
