= Jegliniec, Sejny County =

Jegliniec
- Village
- Location within Poland
- Coordinates: 54°8′57″N 23°7′50″E
- Country: Poland
- Voivodeship: Podlaskie
- County: Sejny
- Gmina: Krasnopol
- Population: 119
- Postal code: 16-503
- Car plates: BSE

Jegliniec ([jɛˈɡliɲɛt͡s]; Lithuanian: Eglinė) is a village in the administrative district of Gmina Krasnopol, within Sejny County, Podlaskie Voivodeship, in north-eastern Poland.

== History ==
Near the village there are relics of a Yotvingian settlement.

The noblee village in the Grodno region was located at the end of the 18th century in the Grodno district of the Trakai Voivodeship of the Grand Duchy of Lithuania.

In 1882 it was numbered at 58 people and 7 homes.

According to the First General Population Census of 1921, the village of Jegliniec had 8 houses and 66 inhabitants. At that time, all inhabitants of the village declared Roman Catholicism. At the same time, the majority of the village inhabitants, 43 people, declared Lithuanian nationality, and the remaining 23 persons declared Polish nationality.

From 1954-1959, the village belonged to and was the seat of the authorities of the Jegliniec community, after it was abolished in the Kaletnik community.

== Sources ==
- VLKK (2002). "Atvirkštinis lietuvių kalboje vartojamų tradicinių Lenkijos vietovardžių formų sąrašas" (PDF). VLKK (in Lithuanian). Archived from the original (PDF) on 2012-02-14.
