= Smolany, Podlaskie Voivodeship =

Smolany Smalėnai
- Village
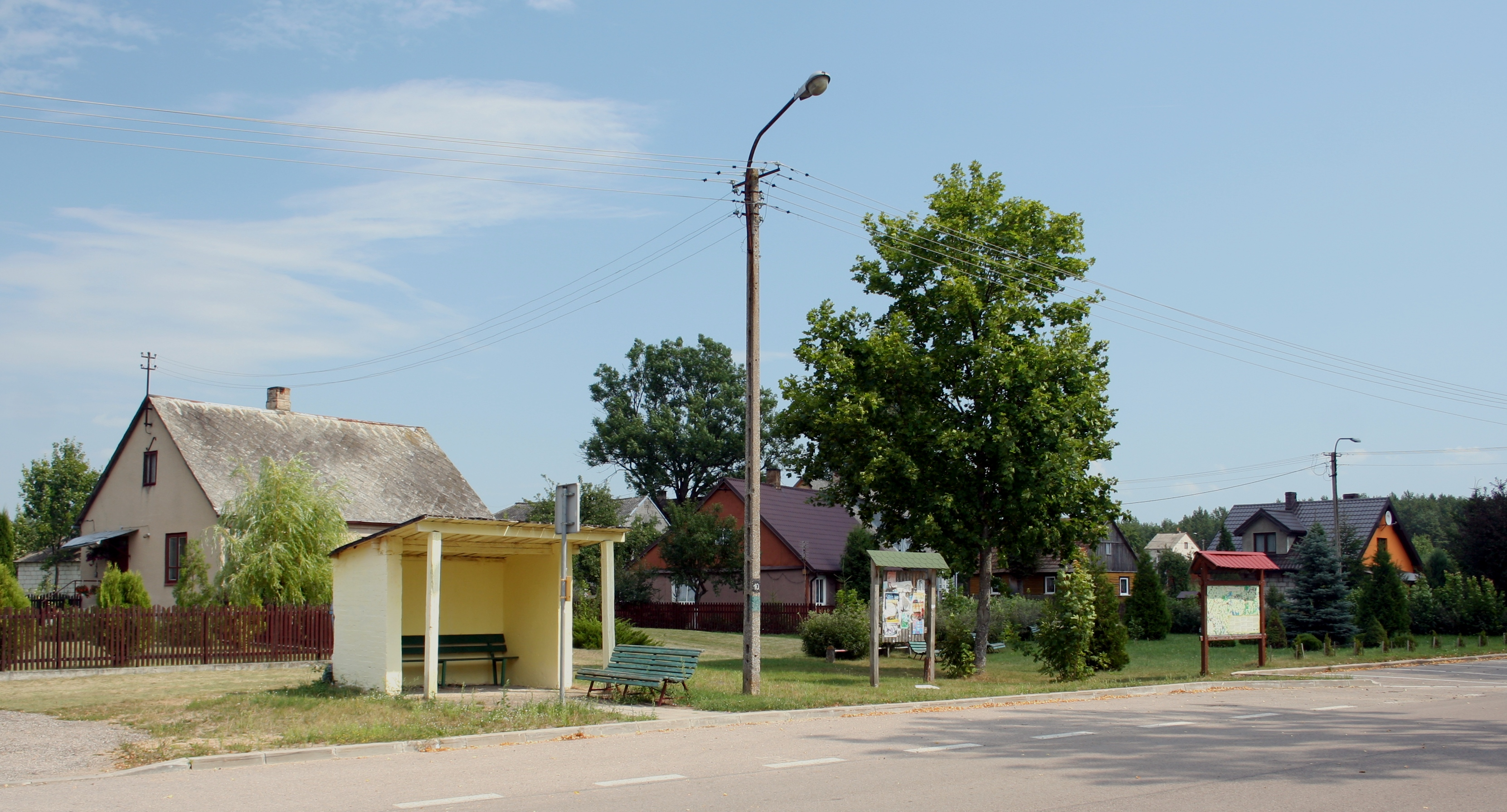

- Location within Poland
- Coordinates: 54°11′N 23°13′E
- Country: Poland
- Voivodeship: Podlaskie
- County: Sejny
- Gmina: Puńsk
- Population: 105
- Postal code: 16-515
- Car plates: BSE

Smolany ([smɔˈlanɨ]; Lithuanian: Smalėnai) is a village in the administrative district of Gmina Puńsk, within Sejny County, Podlaskie Voivodeship, in north-eastern Poland, close to the border with Lithuania.

In the village there is the Roman Catholic parish church of Isidore the Laborer and the seat of the parish.

== History ==
In 1827 it was recorded that the population of the village numbered at 69 and 7 homes, a primary school a brick-built monastery church was built in 1839. in 1889 it was numbered at 253 people and 32 homes

== Tourist attractions ==
- Stone church of Isidore the Laborer built in 1834–39, founded by Michael Haberman,
- Classical, post-Reformation monastery from 1839 to 1840, since 1995 Retreat House of the Diocese of Elk.
- Haberman family burial chapel from 1846.
- Brick fence from the 19th century.

== Smolany in literature ==
Parts of Krwawe srebrniki, a crime-sensation novel by Robert M. Rynkowski, were set in the village.

== Sources ==
- VLKK (2002). "Atvirkštinis lietuvių kalboje vartojamų tradicinių Lenkijos vietovardžių formų sąrašas" (PDF). VLKK (in Lithuanian).
