= Lithuanian minority in Poland =

National minority in Poland

The Lithuanian minority in Poland (Lithuanian: Lenkijos lietuviai; Polish: Litwini w Polsce) consists of 8,000 people (according to the Polish census of 2011) living chiefly in the Podlaskie Voivodeship (mainly in Gmina Puńsk), in the north-eastern part of Poland. The Lithuanian embassy in Poland notes that there are about 15,000 people in Poland of Lithuanian ancestry.

== History ==
Lithuanians are an indigenous people of the territories of north-eastern Podlaskie Voivodeship in Poland, being the descendants of the various Baltic tribes of the region (Yotvingians), which merged into the Lithuanian ethnicity in the Middle Ages. Poland first acquired its Lithuanian minority after the Union of Lublin in 1569, which transferred the administration of the historical Podlaskie Voivodeship from the Grand Duchy of Lithuania to the Polish Crown (both entities then formed a larger, federated state, the Polish–Lithuanian Commonwealth). During the next two centuries, the Lithuanian minority, faced with the dominant Polish culture in the region, was subject to Polonization. After the partitions of Polish–Lithuanian Commonwealth in the late 18th century, the Polish cultural pressure in the region was replaced by that of the Russian Empire, until the end of the First World War resulted in the restoration of independent Polish and Lithuanian states.

== 20th century ==
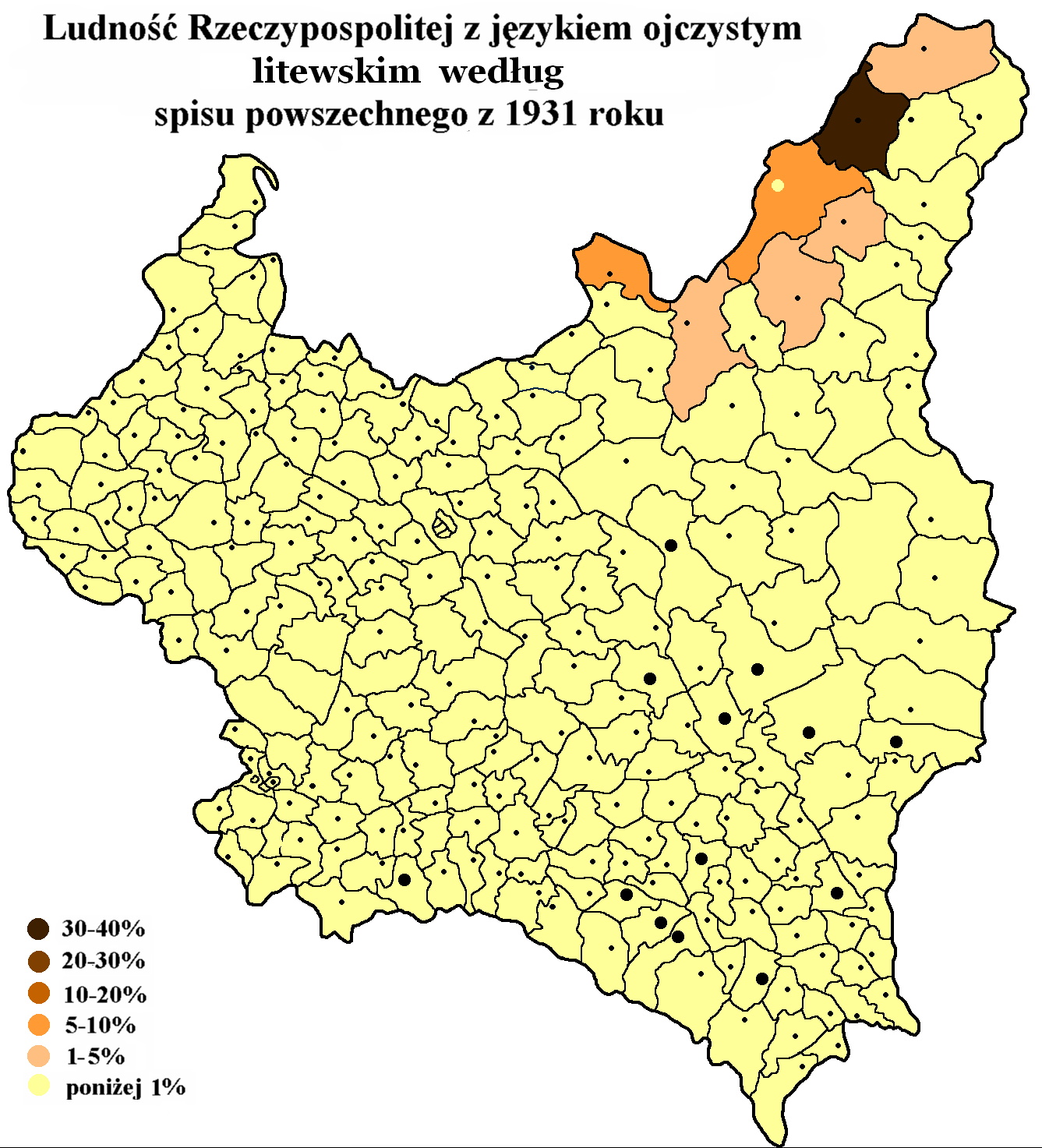
Distribution of Lithuanian speakers in the Second Polish Republic

During the Interwar period of the 20th century (1920–1939) Lithuanian-Polish relations were characterised by mutual enmity. Starting with the conflict over the city of Vilnius, and the Polish–Lithuanian War shortly after the First World War, both governments – in an era when nationalism was sweeping through Europe – treated their respective minorities harshly. When Poland annexed the town of Sejny and its surroundings back in 1919, repressions towards the local Lithuanian population started, including Lithuanian being banned in public, Lithuanian organizations (with 1300 members), schools (with approx. 300 pupils) and press being closed, as well as the confiscation of property and even burning of Lithuanian books. Beginning in 1920, after the staged mutiny of Lucjan Żeligowski, Lithuanian cultural activities in Polish controlled territories were limited; newspapers were closed down and editors arrested. One editor – Mykolas Biržiška – was accused of treason in 1922 and received the death penalty; only direct intervention by the League of Nations spared him this fate. He was one of 32 Lithuanian and Belarusian cultural activists formally expelled from Vilnius on September 20, 1922, and given to the Lithuanian army. When 48 Polish schools were closed in Lithuania in 1927, Józef Piłsudski retaliated by closing many Lithuanian educational establishments in Poland. In the same year 48 Lithuanian schools were closed and 11 Lithuanian activists were deported.

In 1931 there were about 80,000 Lithuanians in Poland, the majority of them (66,300) in Wilno Voivodeship. Following Piłsudski's death in 1935, further Polonisation ensued as the government encouraged the settlement of Polish army veterans in disputed regions. About 400 Lithuanian reading rooms and libraries were closed in Poland in 1936–1938.

The Second World War put an end to the independent Polish and Lithuanian states. After the war, both former states fell under the sphere of influence of the Soviet Union. Poland was shifted westwards, thus giving up most of the disputed territories in the Second Polish Republic, those territories were mostly incorporated into the Lithuanian SSR, itself one of the Republics of the Soviet Union. At the same time, many Poles from the Kresy area were forcibly repatriated west to the "Recovered Territories", and the Polish minority in Lithuania (or Lithuanian SSR) was also significantly downsized. Under the eye of the Soviet Union, the various ethnic groups in the Eastern Bloc were to cooperate peacefully in the spirit of Proletarian internationalism, and that policy, coupled with the population migrations limiting the size of both minorities in the respective regions, resulted in a lessening of tensions between Poles and Lithuanians. However, in the Sejny and Suwałki districts the prohibition against speaking Lithuanian in public lasted until 1950 (and in phone calls until 1990) and it was not until the 1950s that the teaching of Lithuanian was introduced as a subject in schools.

== Modern times ==
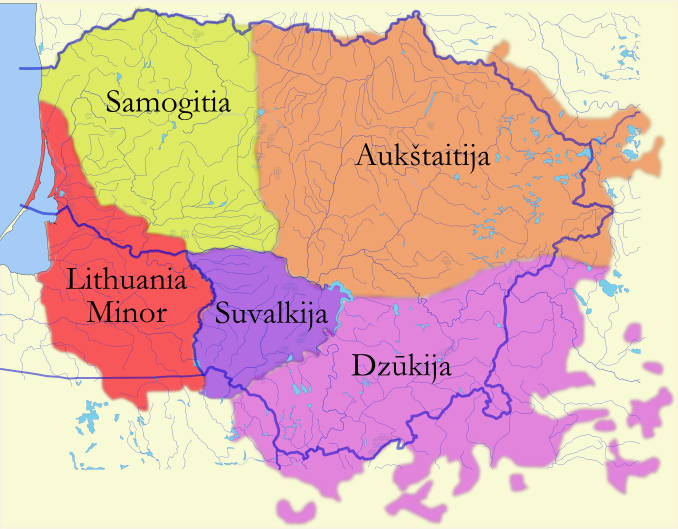
Map illustrating the five historical ethnographic regions of Lithuania shows how parts of Lithuania Minor, Suvalkija, and Dzūkija are in the boundaries of modern Poland.

The modern Lithuanian minority in Poland is composed of 5,639 people according to the Polish census of 2002, with most of them (5,097) living in the Podlaskie Voivodeship (Suwałki Region), particularly in Gmina Puńsk where they form a majority (74.4% of population). According to the Lithuanian embassy there are about 15,000 people of Lithuanian ancestry in Poland. 8,000 people declared Lithuanian identity in the Polish census of 2011 (including 5,000 who declared it as their only nationality, and 3,000 who declared it as the second one, after the Polish nationality).

There are Lithuanian publications (over 80 books have been published, and there are several magazines, of which the largest is "Aušra" (= "Dawn"), co-sponsored by the Polish Ministry of Internal Affairs). Lithuanian organizations are involved in organizing cultural life of the minority (with libraries, choirs, theatres, etc.). There are also Lithuanian-language programmes on local Radio Białystok and Telewizja Białystok.

There are Lithuanian-exclusive schools in Puńsk, both on primary and secondary level, schools with Lithuanian as a teaching language in Sejny, and schools with Lithuanian as a foreign language in the wider region are common. There are 17 Lithuanian schools, attended by over 700 students. The most important of those schools is the liceum (Liceum 11 Marca w Puńsku); there are also three gymnasiums (Gimnazjum „Žiburys” w Sejnach, II Gimnazjum w Sejnach, I Gimnazjum w Sejnach).

There are several Lithuanian cultural organizations in Poland. The oldest one is the Stowarzyszenie Litwinów w Polsce (Association of Lithuanians in Poland), founded in 1992. Others include Wspólnota Litwinów w Polsce (Lithuanian Community in Poland, 1993), Stowarzyszenie Młodzieży Litewskiej w Polsce (Associations of Lithuanian Youth in Poland), Towarzystwo Kultury Etnicznej Litwinów (Association of Ethnic Culture of Lithuanians, 1997), Towarzystwo Nauczycieli Litewskich (Associations of Lithuanian Teachers). There are several buildings dedicated to Lithuanian minority, including the Lithuanian House and an ethnographic museum in Sejny. Various Lithuanian cultural activities include the Lithuanian Meeting (Zlot) in Pszczelnik, and the Lithuanian Musical Festival Sąskrydis. In 2006 the Lithuanian minority received 1,344,912 zlotys (~$450,000) from Polish government in 2006 (22 out of 27 requests were approved).

However local Lithuanian World Community representatives claim there are problems with Lithuanian culture preservation in Sejny region. They argue that Lithuanian heritage is ignored, as currently in Sejny there is not even one street name that would signify presence of prominent Lithuanians. They also note that for more than two years there is no accommodation regarding cemetery where Lithuanian soldiers are buried. Another recent issue is the underfunding of the two Lithuanian gymnasiums in Sejny, which receives only 75% of promised funding.

Lithuanian is recognized as a minority language in Poland, and is a supporting language in Gmina Puńsk in Podlaskie Voivodeship, where, by 20 February 2011, 30 Lithuanian place names were introduced alongside names in Polish (bilingual signs). Lithuanian has been used in Gmina Puńsk as a second language since 2006.

Ethnic Lithuanians control the administration in Gmina Puńsk, and they also have elected several representatives in Sejny County.

== See also ==
- Lithuania–Poland relations
- Lithuanian diaspora
- Immigration to Poland
- Kresy
- Polish minority in Lithuania
- Belarusians in Poland
- Ukrainians in Poland
- German minority in Poland

== Bibliography ==
- Ogonowski, Jerzy (2000). Uprawnienia językowe mniejszości narodowych w Rzeczypospolitej Polskiej 1918–1939 (in Polish). Warszawa: Wydawnictwo Sejmowe. ISBN 83-7059-404-2.
- Żołędowski, Cezary (2003). Białorusini i Litwini w Polsce, Polacy na Białorusi i Litwie (in Polish). Warszawa: ASPRA-JR. ISBN 83-88766-76-7.
- Skarbek, Jan (1996). Białoruś, Czechosłowacja, Litwa, Polska, Ukraina. Mniejszości w świetle spisów statystycznych XIX-XX w. (in Polish). Lublin: Instytut Europy Środkowo-Wschodniej. ISBN 83-85854-16-9.
- Sławomir Łodziński; Lucjan Adamczuk, eds. (2006). Mniejszości narodowe w Polsce w świetle Narodowego Spisu Powszechnego z 2002 roku (in Polish). Warszawa: Scholar. ISBN 83-7383-143-6.
- Makowski, Bronisław (1986). Litwini w Polsce 1920-1939 (in Polish). Warszawa: PWN. ISBN 83-01-06805-1..
