= State Commission on the Lithuanian Language =

Official language regulating body of Lithuanian language

The State Commission on the Lithuanian Language
- Formation: June 20, 1990; 36 years ago
- Founded: 1994
- Founder: Government of Lithuania
- Type: Cultural institution
- Purpose: Legality
- Headquarters: Vilnius, Lithuania
- Region served: Worldwide
- Product: Lithuanian language

The State Commission on the Lithuanian Language (Lithuanian: Valstybinė lietuvių kalbos komisija, VLKK) is the official language regulating body of the Lithuanian language.

The Language Commission was put in operation in 1961 as a non-governmental entity under the auspices of the Lithuanian Academy of Sciences.

Now, it is a state-run language policy, founded under the auspices of the Seimas (parliament) of Lithuania. The mandate of the Commission comprises not only regulation and standardization of the language, but also implementation of the official language status. Commission decrees on linguistic issues are compulsory by law for all companies, agencies, institutions, and the media in Lithuania.
