= Karolin, Podlaskie Voivodeship =

Karolin
- Village
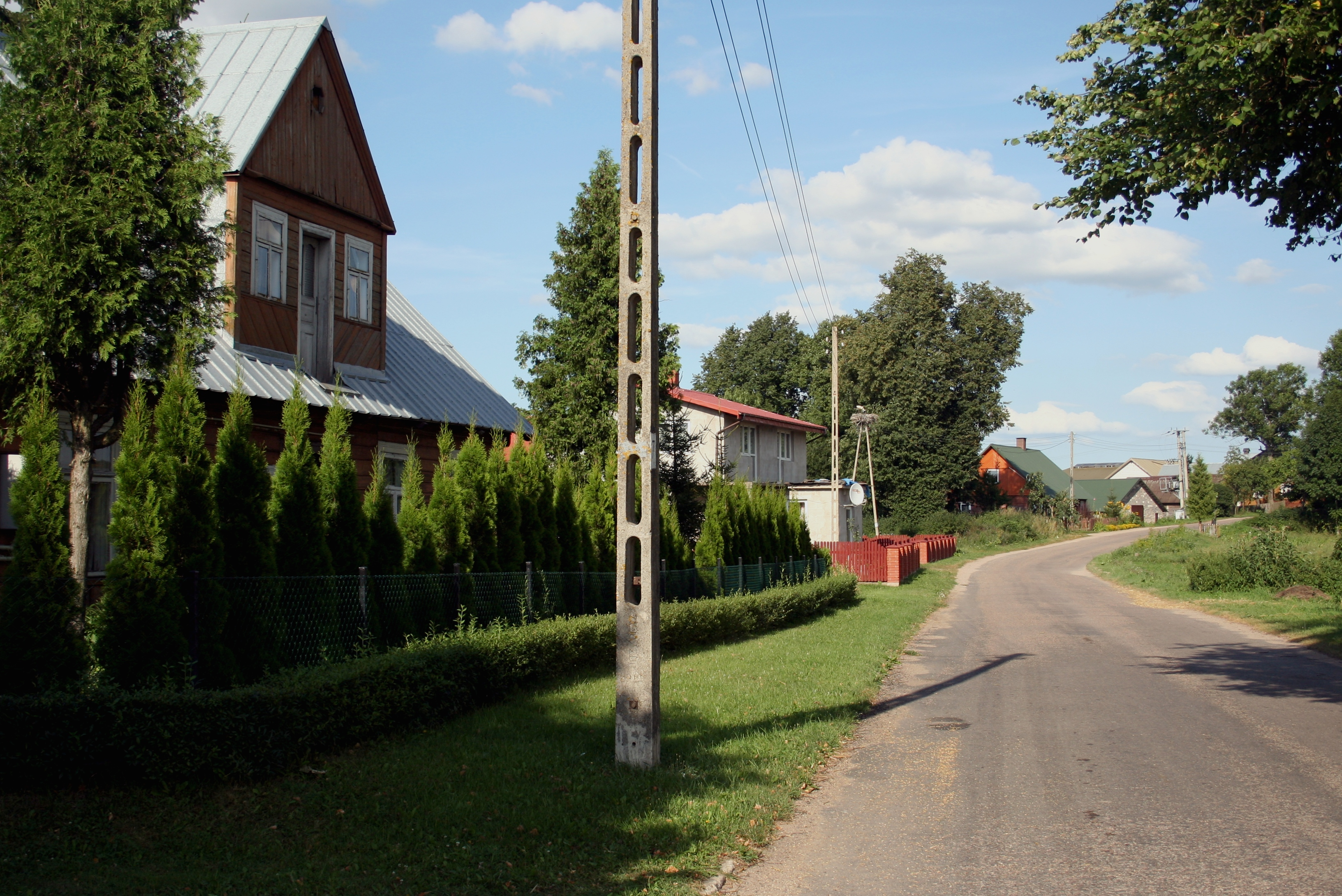

- Location within Poland
- Coordinates: 54°3′N 23°17′E
- Country: Poland
- Voivodeship: Podlaskie
- County: Sejny
- Gmina: Giby
- Founded: 1796
- Founder: Ludwik Skąpski
- Named for: Karolina Skąpska

Population (2021)
  - Total: 97
- Postal code: 16-506
- Vehicle registration: BSE
- SIMC: 0757565

Karolin [kaˈrɔlin], is a village in the administrative district of Gmina Giby, within Sejny County, Podlaskie Voivodeship, in north-eastern Poland, close to the borders with Belarus and Lithuania.

== History ==
Karolin was founded by Ludwik Skąpski in 1796 and named after his wife Karolina. In 1815, it became part of Russian-controlled Congress Poland. Following the unsuccessful Polish November Uprising, the Tsarist administration confiscated the manor farm, and handed it over to Russian Old Believers. It was then named Pokrowsk since 1842.

Three Polish citizens were murdered by Nazi Germany in the village during World War II.

== Tourist attractions ==
In the village there is the former Orthodox Church of the Protection of the Mother of God (Unitarian) and now the Roman Catholic parish church of the Holy Family, built with brick, with valuable interior decoration. Entered in the register of historical monuments (Reg. No.: 654 of 10.03.1988)
