= Wysoki Most, Podlaskie Voivodeship =

Wysoki Most
- Village
- Location within Poland
- Coordinates: 54°3′N 23°13′E
- Country: Poland
- Voivodeship: Podlaskie
- County: Sejny
- Gmina: Giby
- Population (2021): 26
- Postal code: 16-503
- SIMC: 0757772
- Car plates: BSE

Wysoki Most [vɨˈsɔki ˈmɔst], is a village in the administrative district of Gmina Giby, within Sejny County, Podlaskie Voivodeship, in north-eastern Poland, close to the borders with Belarus and Lithuania.

The faithful of the Roman Catholic Church belong to the parish of the Immaculate Conception of the Blessed Virgin Mary in Wigry.

== History ==
In 1827 it was recorded that the population of the village was numbered at 17 inhabitants and 1 home, in 1895 the population of the village was recorded at 80 inhabitants and 8 homes.
