= Daniłowce =

- Village
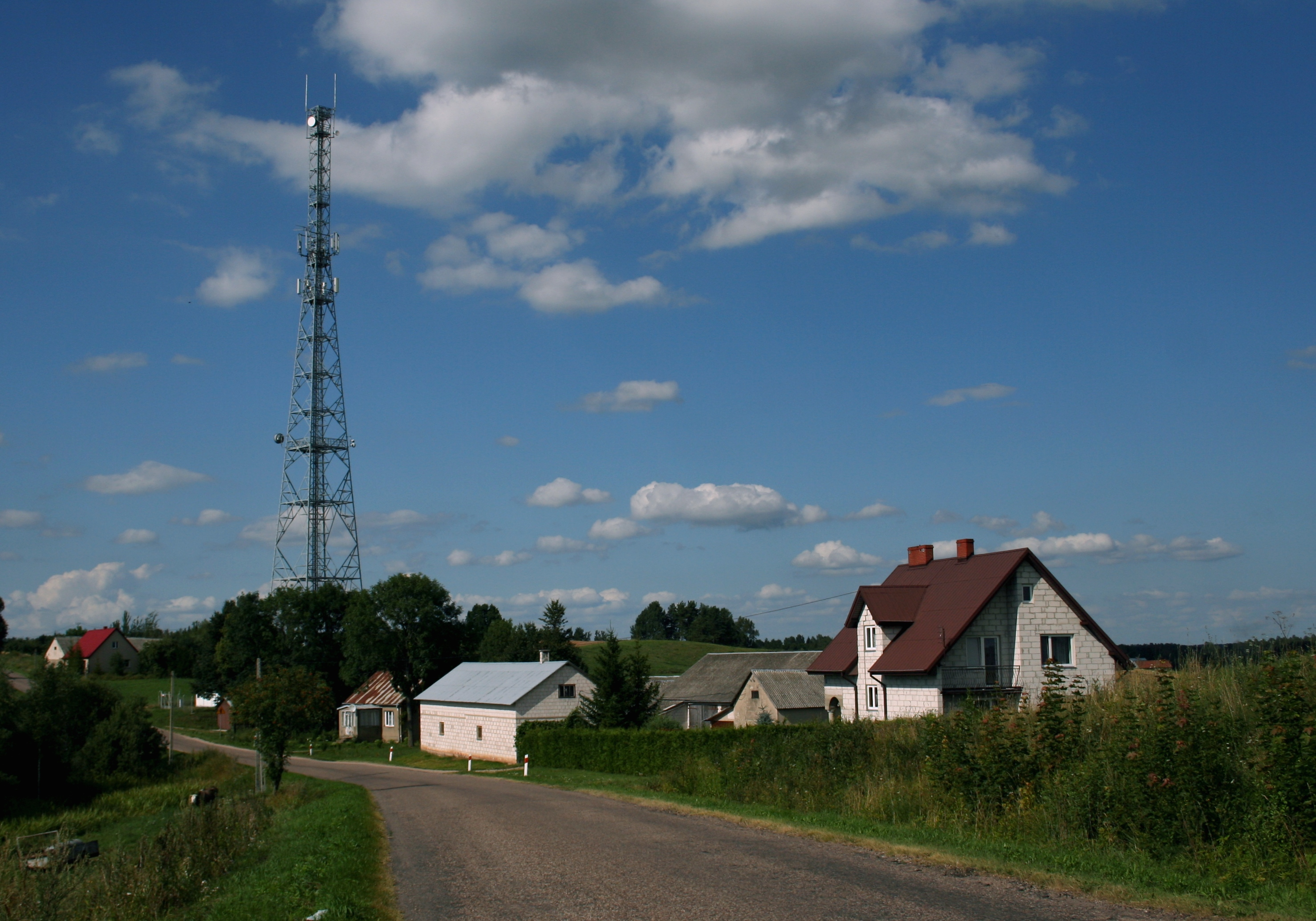

- Location within Poland
- Coordinates: 54°5′N 23°18′E
- Country: Poland
- Voivodeship: Podlaskie
- County: Sejny
- Gmina: Giby
- Population (2021): 79
- Time zone: UTC+1 (CET)
  - Summer (DST): UTC+2 (CEST)
- Postal code: 16-506
- SIMC: 0757370
- Car plates: BSE

Daniłowce ([daniˈwɔft͡sɛ]; Lithuanian: Danilovcė) is a village in the administrative district of Gmina Giby, within Sejny County, Podlaskie Voivodeship, in north-eastern Poland, close to the borders with Belarus and Lithuania.

== History ==
The clergy village was located at the end of the 18th century in the Grodno County of the Trakai Voivodeship in the Polish–Lithuanian Commonwealth.

In 1827 it was recorded that the population of the village numbered at 63 and 8 homes and in 1880 it was numbered at 99 people and 12 homes.
