= Stanowisko, Podlaskie Voivodeship =

Stanowisko
- Village
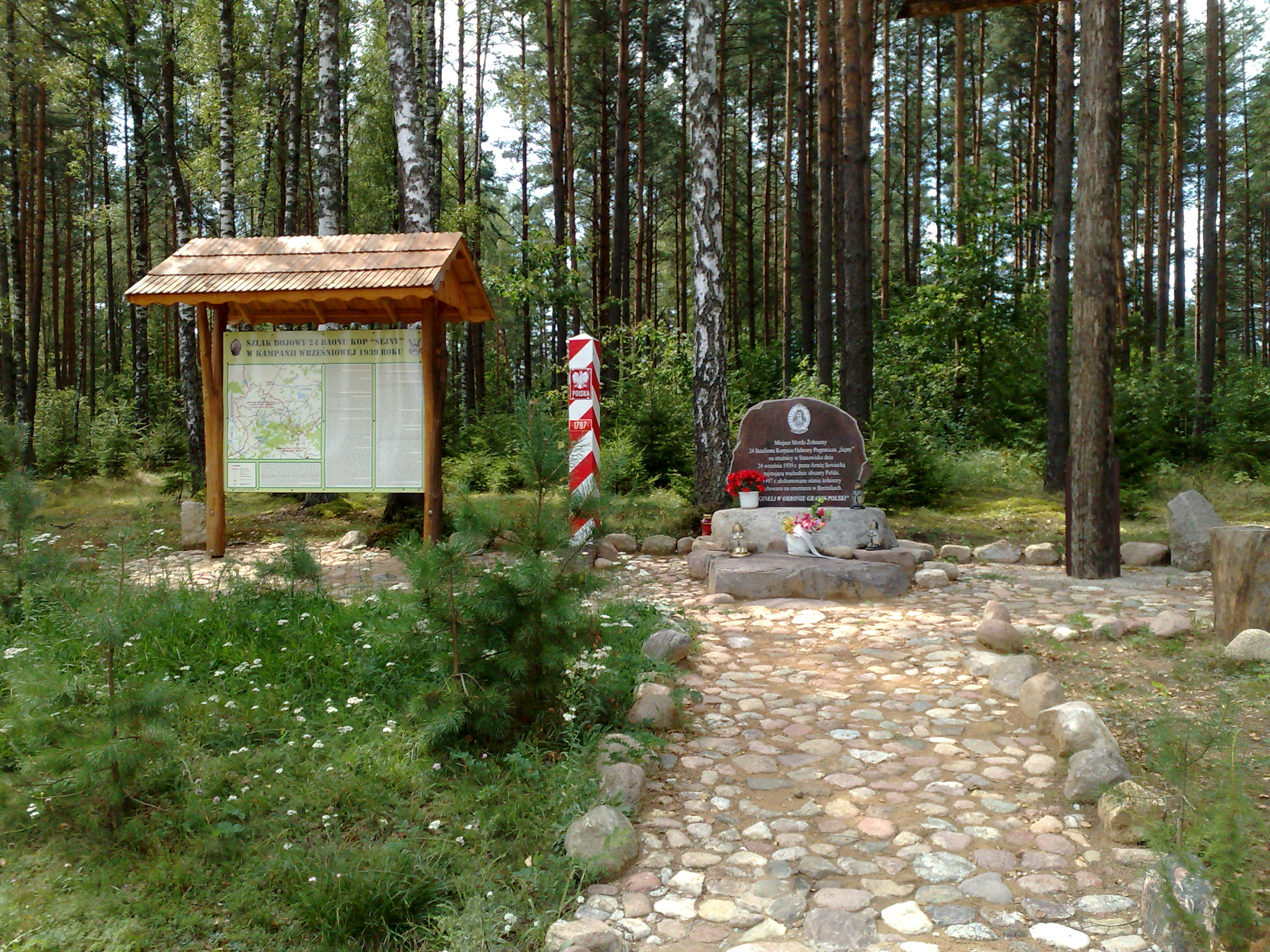
- Memorial at the site of a Soviet-perpetrated murder of Polish soldiers during World War II
- Interactive map of Stanowisko
- Location within Poland
- Coordinates: 53°59′N 23°30′E
- Country: Poland
- Voivodeship: Podlaskie
- County: Sejny
- Gmina: Giby

Population (2021)
  - Total: 24
- Time zone: UTC+1 (CET)
  - Summer (DST): UTC+2 (CEST)
- Postal code: 16-506
- SIMC: 0757708
- Car plates: BSE

Stanowisko [stanɔˈviskɔ], is a village in the administrative district of Gmina Giby, within Sejny County, Podlaskie Voivodeship, in north-eastern Poland, close to the borders with Belarus and Lithuania.

It is the nearest village to the BYLTPL tripoint that lies to the SE and is reached through forest tracks.

== History ==
The royal village was located at the end of the 18th century in the Grodno County of the Trakai Voivodeship in the Polish–Lithuanian Commonwealth.

In 1827 it was recorded that the village had a population of 27 inhabitants and 2 homes, in 1890 the population was recorded at 54 inhabitants and 9 homes.

In the interwar period a guard post of the Border Protection Corps was stationed here, after the war a WOP watchtower.
