= Czarna Hańcza, Podlaskie Voivodeship =

Settlement in Gmina Giby, Poland

Czarna Hańcza
- Settlement
- Location within Poland
- Coordinates: 54°03′43″N 23°16′58″E
- Country: Poland
- Voivodeship: Podlaskie
- County: Sejny
- Gmina: Giby
- Postal code: 16-506
- SIMC: 0757625
- Car plates: BSE

Czarna Hańcza ([ˈt͡ʂarna ˈxaɲt͡ʂa], Lithuanian: Juodoji Ančia) is a settlement in the administrative district of Gmina Giby, within Sejny County, Podlaskie Voivodeship, in north-eastern Poland, close to the borders with Belarus and Lithuania.
