= Głęboki Bród =

- Village
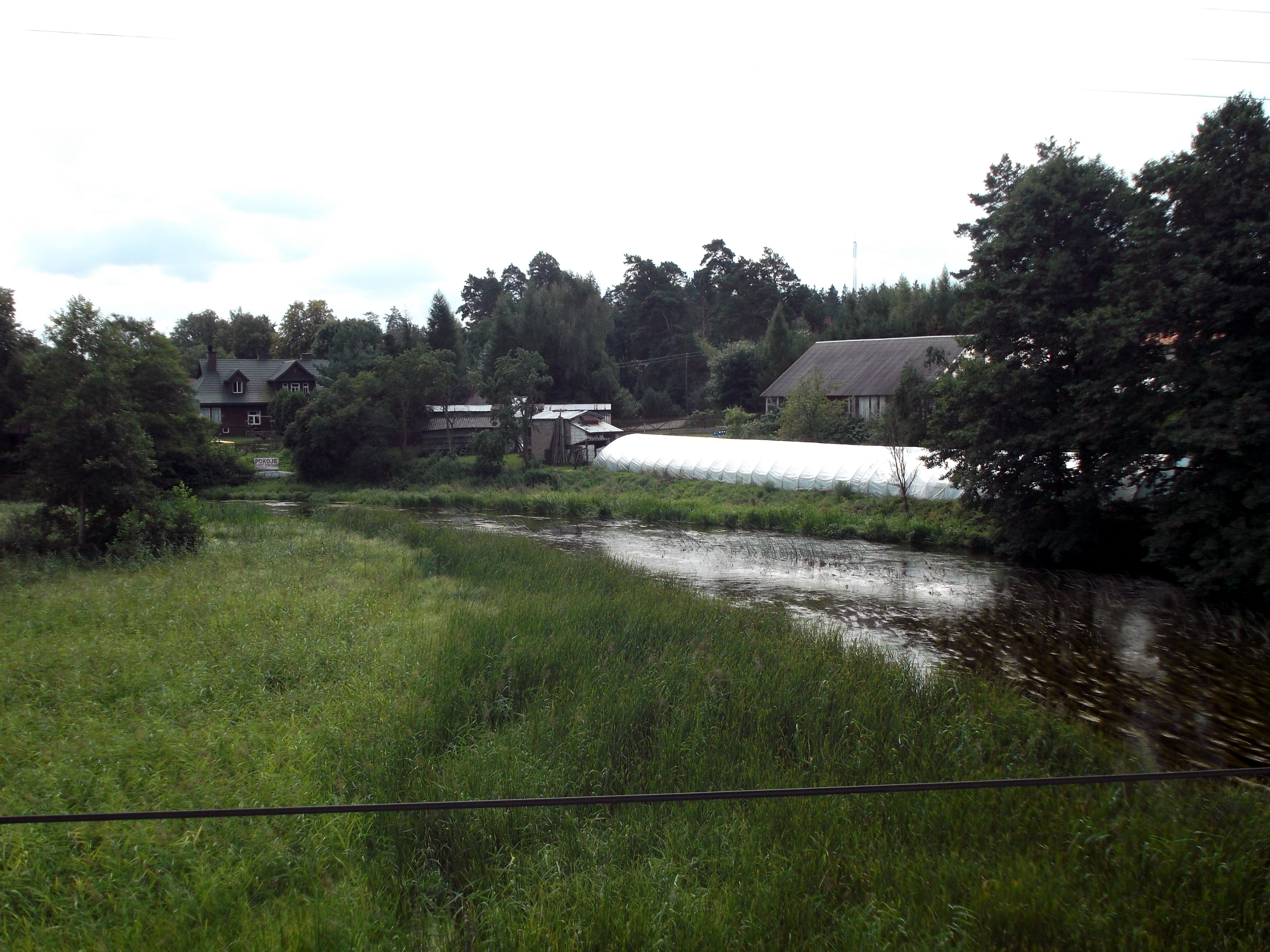

- Location within Poland
- Coordinates: 53°59′N 23°18′E
- Country: Poland
- Voivodeship: Podlaskie
- County: Sejny
- Gmina: Giby
- Population (2021): 118
- Postal code: 16-506
- SIMC: 0757507
- Car plates: BSE

Głęboki Bród [ɡwɛmˈbɔki ˈbrut], is a village in the administrative district of Gmina Giby, within Sejny County, Podlaskie Voivodeship, in north-eastern Poland, close to the borders with Belarus and Lithuania.

In the years 1954-1972 the village belonged to and was the seat of the Głęboki Bród municipality.
