= Krasne, Gmina Giby =

Krasne
- Village
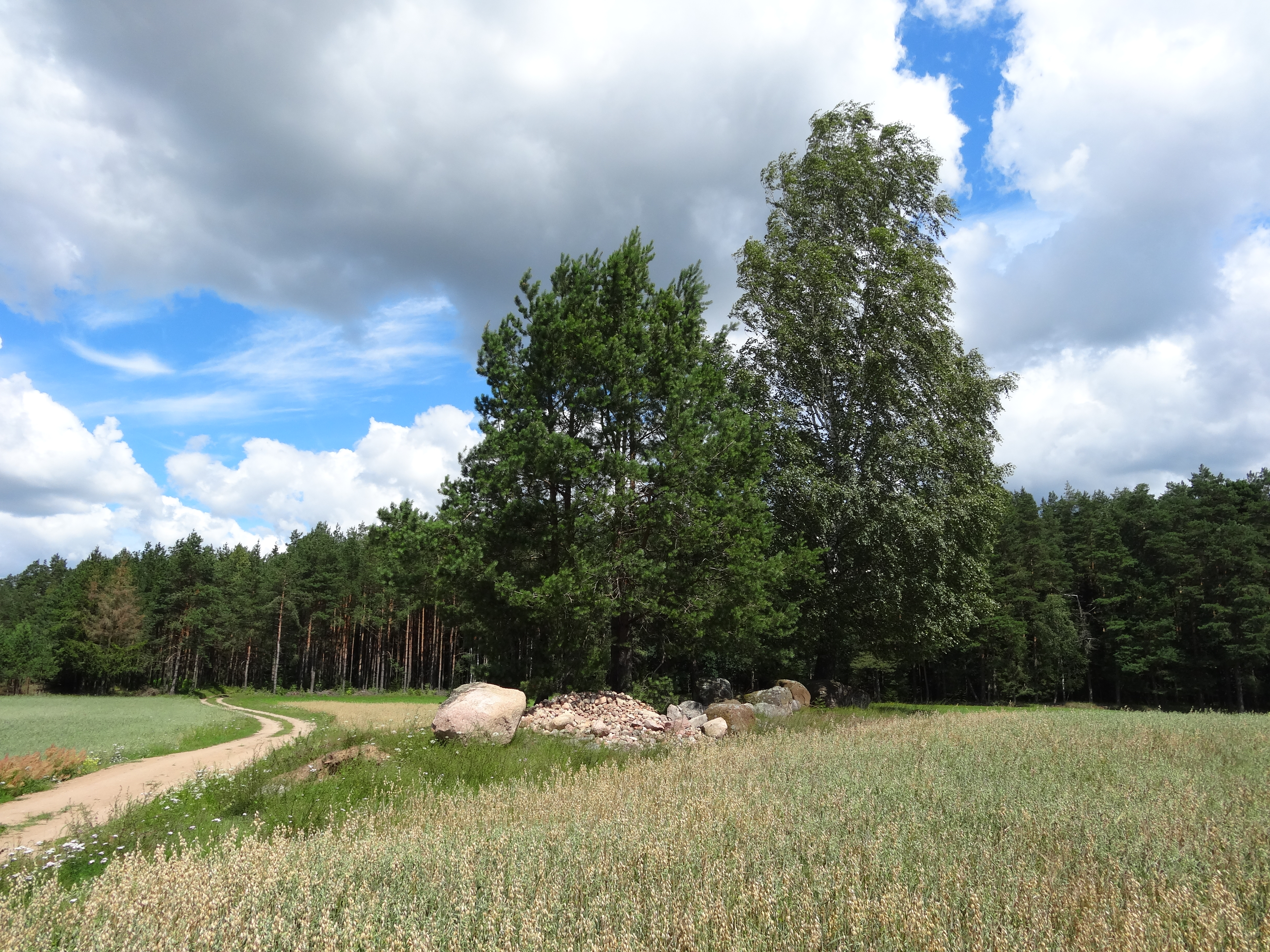

- Location within Poland
- Coordinates: 54°01′17″N 23°16′54″E
- Country: Poland
- Voivodeship: Podlaskie
- County: Sejny
- Gmina: Giby
- Population (2021): 15
- Postal code: 16-506
- SIMC: 0757588
- Car plates: BSE

Krasne [ˈkrasnɛ], is a village in the administrative district of Gmina Giby, within Sejny County, Podlaskie Voivodeship, in north-eastern Poland, close to the borders with Belarus and Lithuania.
