= Pogorzelec, Podlaskie Voivodeship =

Pogorzelec
- Village
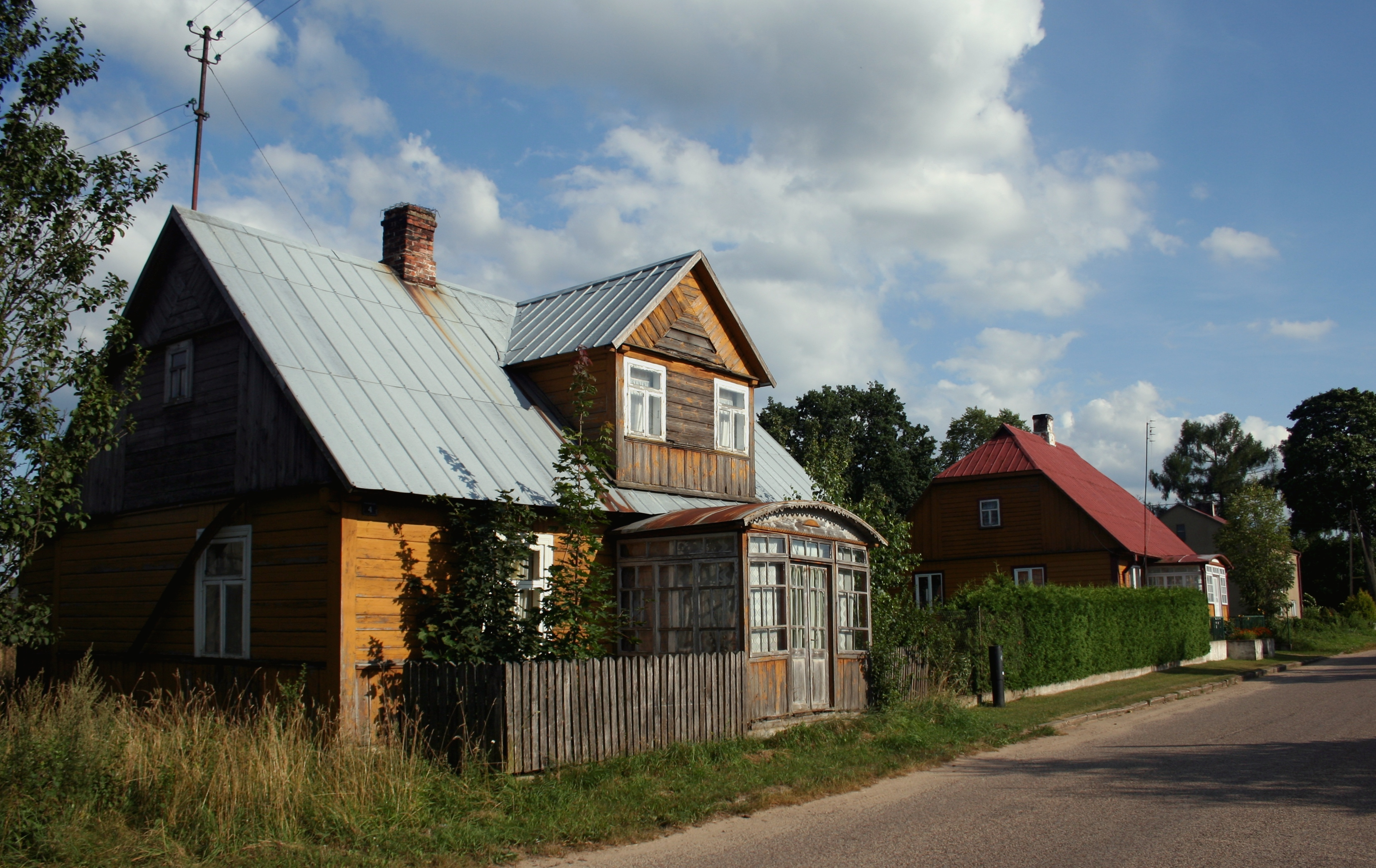

- Location within Poland
- Coordinates: 54°2′N 23°16′E
- Country: Poland
- Voivodeship: Podlaskie
- County: Sejny
- Gmina: Giby
- Founded: 18th century

Population (2021)
  - Total: 204
- Postal code: 16-506
- SIMC: 0757648
- Car plates: BSE

Pogorzelec [pɔɡɔˈʐɛlɛt͡s], is a village in the administrative district of Gmina Giby, within Sejny County, Podlaskie Voivodeship, in north-eastern Poland, close to the borders with Belarus and Lithuania.

In the village there was a wooden molna built in 1912. In 1982 it was transported to Giby at present it is the Roman Catholic parish church of St Anna. Remains of an Old Believers' cemetery have been preserved to this day in Pogorzelec.

== History ==
The village was founded in the 18th century by Russian Old Believers who fled Russia, where they were persecuted on religious grounds

In 1827 it was documented that the village population was 326 inhabitants and 26 homes and In 1830, Onufry Yakovlev (Smirnov), who came from Pogorzelec, founded the village of Onufryjevo, which was then in the territory of East Prussia, thus giving rise to the Mazurian diaspora of Old Believers centred around the molennia in Wojnowo, in 1887 it was documented that the village population was numbered at 544 inhabitants and 72 homes.

According to the First General Population Census, conducted in 1921, the village of Pogorzelec had 461 inhabitants, living in 87 houses. The vast majority of Pogorzelec residents, 379 in number, declared an Old Believer religion. The others reported, in turn, the Roman Catholic faith (81 persons) and the Orthodox faith (1 person). The religious division of the inhabitants of the village almost completely coincided with their national-ethnic structure, as 375 persons declared Russian nationality and the remaining 86 persons reported Polish national identity.

Four Polish citizens were murdered by Nazi Germany in the village during World War II.

== Tourist attractions ==
The following objects are included in the register of monuments of the National Heritage Institute:

- wooden house No. 42, 2nd half of the 19th century (Reg. No. 28 of 13.04.1979)
