= Gibasówka =

Village in Gmina Giby, Poland

- Village
- Location within Poland
- Coordinates: 53°57′30″N 23°17′30″E
- Country: Poland
- Voivodeship: Podlaskie
- County: Sejny
- Gmina: Giby
- Population (2021): 32
- Postal code: 16-506
- SIMC: 0757460
- Car plates: BSE

Gibasówka [ɡibaˈsufka], is a village in the administrative district of Gmina Giby, within Sejny County, Podlaskie Voivodeship, in north-eastern Poland, close to the borders with Belarus and Lithuania. It is situated on national road 16.
