= Frącki, Podlaskie Voivodeship =

Frącki
- Village
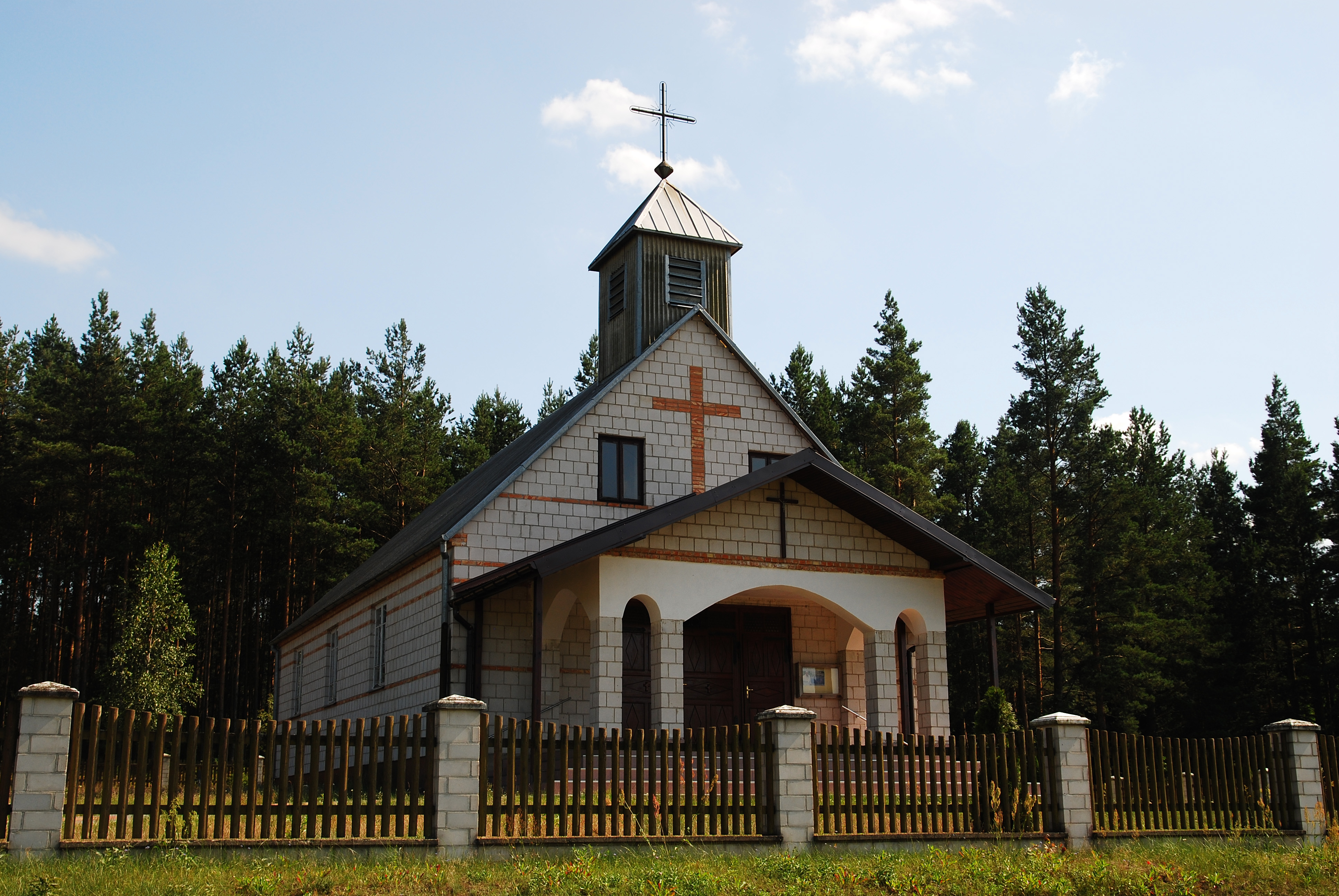
- Saint Maximilian Mary Kolbe church

- Location within Poland
- Coordinates: 53°59′N 23°18′E
- Country: Poland
- Voivodeship: Podlaskie
- County: Sejny
- Gmina: Giby

Population (2021)
  - Total: 162
- Time zone: UTC+1 (CET)
  - Summer (DST): UTC+2 (CEST)
- Postal code: 16-506
- Vehicle registration: BSE
- SIMC: 0757447

Frącki ([ˈfrɔnt͡ski]) is a village in the administrative district of Gmina Giby, within Sejny County, Podlaskie Voivodeship, in north-eastern Poland, close to the borders with Belarus and Lithuania.

== History ==
in 1881 it was recorded that the population of the village was 130 people with 20 homes.

According to the 1921 census, the village had a population of 116, entirely Polish by nationality and Roman Catholic by confession.

Three Polish citizens were murdered by Nazi Germany in the village during World War II.

== Tourist attractions ==
In the village there is a World War I war cemetery listed in the register of historical monuments (Reg. No.: 421 of 31.01.1985).
