= Budwieć =

- Village
- Interactive map of Budwieć
- Location within Poland
- Coordinates: 54°00′00″N 23°29′00″E
- Country: Poland
- Voivodeship: Podlaskie
- County: Sejny
- Gmina: Giby
- Population (2021): 49
- Time zone: UTC+1 (CET)
  - Summer (DST): UTC+2 (CEST)
- Postal code: 16-506
- SIMC: 0757358
- Car plates: BSE

Budwieć [ˈbudvjɛt͡ɕ], is a village in the administrative district of Gmina Giby, within Sejny County, Podlaskie Voivodeship, in Northeastern Poland, close to the borders with Belarus and Lithuania.

== History ==
The royal village was located at the end of the 18th century in the Grodno County of the Trakai Voivodeship in the Polish–Lithuanian Commonwealth.

in 1880 it was recorded that village had a population of 241 people and 28 homes.

In the inter-war period a guard post of the Border Protection Corps was stationed here.
