= Wiłkokuk =

- Village
- Location within Poland
- Coordinates: 54°0′34″N 23°24′44″E
- Country: Poland
- Voivodeship: Podlaskie
- County: Sejny
- Gmina: Giby
- Postal code: 16-506
- SIMC: 0757826
- Car plates: BSE

Wiłkokuk [viu̯ˈkɔkuk], is a village in the administrative district of Gmina Giby, within Sejny County, Podlaskie Voivodeship, in north-eastern Poland, close to the borders with Belarus and Lithuania.
