= Tartaczysko =

- Village
- Location within Poland
- Coordinates: 54°0′N 23°17′E
- Country: Poland
- Voivodeship: Podlaskie
- County: Sejny
- Gmina: Giby

Population (2021)
  - Total: 40
- Postal code: 16-506
- SIMC: 0757737
- Car plates: BSE

Tartaczysko [tartaˈt͡ʂɨskɔ], is a village in the administrative district of Gmina Giby, within Sejny County, Podlaskie Voivodeship, in north-eastern Poland, close to the borders with Belarus and Lithuania.

Nine Polish citizens were murdered by Nazi Germany in the village during World War II.
