= Wielki Bór, Podlaskie Voivodeship =

Wielki Bór
- Settlement
- Location within Poland
- Coordinates: 54°0′5″N 23°20′46″E
- Country: Poland
- Voivodeship: Podlaskie
- County: Sejny
- Gmina: Giby
- Postal code: 16-515
- SIMC: 0757453
- Car plates: BSE

Wielki Bór (Polish pronunciation: [ˈvjɛlkʲi ˈbur]) is a settlement in the administrative district of Gmina Giby, within Sejny County, Podlaskie Voivodeship, in north-eastern Poland, close to the borders with Belarus and Lithuania.
