= Posejnele =

- Village
- Location within Poland
- Coordinates: 54°4′N 23°23′E
- Country: Poland
- Voivodeship: Podlaskie
- County: Sejny
- Gmina: Giby
- Population (2021): 106
- Postal code: 16-506
- SIMC: 0757677
- Car plates: BSE

Posejnele [pɔsɛi̯ˈnɛlɛ], is a village in the administrative district of Gmina Giby, within Sejny County, Podlaskie Voivodeship, in north-eastern Poland, close to the borders with Belarus and Lithuania.

== Geography ==
The village is located in a picturesque area, on the edge of the Augustów Primeval Forest. There are several nature reserves nearby, including beaver dams and runs for Lek mating. The village itself is home to the ‘Pomorze’ nature reserve, which protects old trees (natural monuments). There are three small lakes in the village area: Świerszczeń, Samań and Dowcień, and one large lake - Pomorze.

== History ==
=== Classical era ===
Not far from Posejnela, there is a hill overgrown with forest, called grodzisko (hillfort). Traces of a settlement from the 3rd - 2nd century BC, as well as medieval traces of the Yotvingians were found there. This 12-metre-high hill is flanked on one side by the river Marycha, while the other side was provided with a moat. Access to it was most probably in the south-western part, where remains of a palisade structure (possibly a watchtower) can be found. Remnants of the development are also embankments with an interlocking construction of branches and sand.

=== Polish-Lithuanian Commonwealth ===
The village of Posejnele was once part of the Sejny estate, founded between 1547 and 1561. When the town of Berżniki was founded, the estate was given to Andrzej Bujwid-Stryszka, governor of Berżniki. They later bordered on the estate of the Dominicans of Sejny. In the 18th century, boyars lived in Posejnele. They were not subject to serfdom, but paid rents.

=== Congress Poland ===
In 1827 the village had a population of 113 inhabitants and 16 homes, in 1887 the population numbered 167 inhabitants and 23 homes
