= Dziemianówka =

- Village
- Location within Poland
- Coordinates: 53°57′N 23°17′E
- Country: Poland
- Voivodeship: Podlaskie
- County: Sejny
- Gmina: Giby
- Population (2021): 82
- Postal code: 16-506
- SIMC: 0757430
- Car plates: BSE

Dziemianówka [d͡ʑɛmjaˈnufka], is a village in the administrative district of Gmina Giby, within Sejny County, Podlaskie Voivodeship, in northeastern Poland, close to the borders with Belarus and Lithuania.

== History ==
According to the First General Population Census conducted in 1921, Dziemianówka had 14 houses and was inhabited by 57 people. Most of the inhabitants of the village, 39 in number, declared the Roman Catholic religion, while the remaining 18 declared an Old Believer religion. The religious division of the inhabitants of Dziemianówka coincided with their national-ethnic structure, as 39 persons declared Polish nationality, while the remaining 18 declared Russian national identity.

In 1929 it was documented that there was one carpenter, a wheelwright and two shoemakers. There was one lime kiln.
