= Głęboka Biel =

Settlement in Gmina Giby, Poland

- Settlement
- Location within Poland
- Coordinates: 53°57′40″N 23°17′40″E
- Country: Poland
- Voivodeship: Podlaskie
- County: Sejny
- Gmina: Giby
- Postal code: 16-506
- SIMC: 0757789
- Car plates: BSE

Głęboka Biel [ɡwɛmˈbɔka ˈbjɛl], is a settlement in the administrative district of Gmina Giby, within Sejny County, Podlaskie Voivodeship, in north-eastern Poland, close to the borders with Belarus and Lithuania. It lies on the banks of the Czarna Hancza River
