= Iwanówka, Sejny County =

Iwanówka
- Village
- Location within Poland
- Coordinates: 54°5′N 23°20′E
- Country: Poland
- Voivodeship: Podlaskie
- County: Sejny
- Gmina: Giby
- Population (2021): 55
- Postal code: 16-506
- SIMC: 0757559
- Car plates: BSE

Iwanówka [ivaˈnufka], is a village in the administrative district of Gmina Giby, within Sejny County, Podlaskie Voivodeship, in north-eastern Poland, close to the borders with Belarus and Lithuania.

== History ==
In 1882 it was recorded that the village had a population of 42 people with 11 homes.

In 1921, the village had 5 houses and 38 inhabitants, including 28 Catholics and 10 Old Believers.
