= Pomorze, Podlaskie Voivodeship =

Pomorze
- Village
- Location within Poland
- Coordinates: 54°03′46″N 23°21′49″E
- Country: Poland
- Voivodeship: Podlaskie
- County: Sejny
- Gmina: Giby
- Population (2021): 96
- Time zone: UTC+1 (CET)
  - Summer (DST): UTC+2 (CEST)
- Postal code: 16-506
- SIMC: 0757660
- Car plates: BSE

Pomorze [pɔˈmɔʐɛ], is a village in the administrative district of Gmina Giby, within Sejny County, Podlaskie Voivodeship, in north-eastern Poland, close to the borders with Belarus and Lithuania.

== History ==
The royal village was located at the end of the 18th century in the Grodno County of the Trakai Voivodeship in the Polish–Lithuanian Commonwealth.

In 1827 the village had a population of 34 inhabitants and 5 homes and in 1887 it was 68 inhabitants and 8 homes.
