= Okółek =

- Village
- Location within Poland
- Coordinates: 53°56′51″N 23°20′40″E
- Country: Poland
- Voivodeship: Podlaskie
- County: Sejny
- Gmina: Giby
- Population (2021): 52
- Postal code: 16-506
- SIMC: 0757602
- Car plates: BSE

Okółek [ɔˈkuwɛk], is a village in the administrative district of Gmina Giby, within Sejny County, Podlaskie Voivodeship, in north-eastern Poland, close to the borders with Belarus and Lithuania. It lies near the Czarną Hańczą river.

In 1886 it was documented that Okółek had 6 homes.
