= Zelwa, Sejny County =

Zelwa
- Village
- Location within Poland
- Coordinates: 54°2′N 23°27′E
- Country: Poland
- Voivodeship: Podlaskie
- County: Sejny
- Gmina: Giby
- Population (2021): 176
- Postal code: 16-506
- SIMC: 0757810
- Car plates: BSE

Zelwa [ˈzɛlva], is a village in the administrative district of Gmina Giby, within Sejny County, Podlaskie Voivodeship, in north-eastern Poland, close to the borders with Belarus and Lithuania.

== Geography ==
The village of Zelwa lies between the river Marycha and the shore of Lake Zelwa. On the opposite side of the river Marycha, one can find a small settlement called Kiecie - now incorporated into the village of Zelwa.

== History ==
In 1827 it was recorded that the population of the village was numbered at 111 inhabitants and 14 homes, in 1895 it was recorded that the population was 203 inhabitants and 23 homes.

== Tourist attractions ==
- There is a small ethnographic museum in the village, including an open-air museum established by a local. Visitors are offered demonstrations of rural activities such as spinning, weaving, cordage making, net tying, wood and iron processing, flax processing, bread baking and others
- In the village there is the Recreation Centre ‘Zelwa’ and several agro-tourism farms, which offer accommodation and catering to visitors.
