= Chylinki =

- Settlement
- Location within Poland
- Coordinates: 53°57′57″N 23°17′59″E
- Country: Poland
- Voivodeship: Podlaskie
- County: Sejny
- Gmina: Giby
- Postal code: 16-506
- SIMC: 0757513
- Car plates: BSE

Chylinki [xɨˈlinki], is a settlement in the administrative district of Gmina Giby, within Sejny County, Podlaskie Voivodeship, in north-eastern Poland, close to the borders with Belarus and Lithuania.
