= Studziany Las =

- Village
- Location within Poland
- Coordinates: 54°2′N 23°14′E
- Country: Poland
- Voivodeship: Podlaskie
- County: Sejny
- Gmina: Giby
- Population (2021): 73
- Postal code: 16-506
- SIMC: 0757720
- Car plates: BSE

Studziany Las [stuˈd͡ʑanɨ ˈlas], is a village in the administrative district of Gmina Giby, within Sejny County, Podlaskie Voivodeship, in north-eastern Poland, close to the borders with Belarus and Lithuania.

== History ==
In 1827 it was recorded that the population of the village was numbered at 43 inhabitants and 2 homes, in 1890 it was recorded that the village population numbered 50 inhabitants and 12 homes.
