= Sarnetki =

- Village
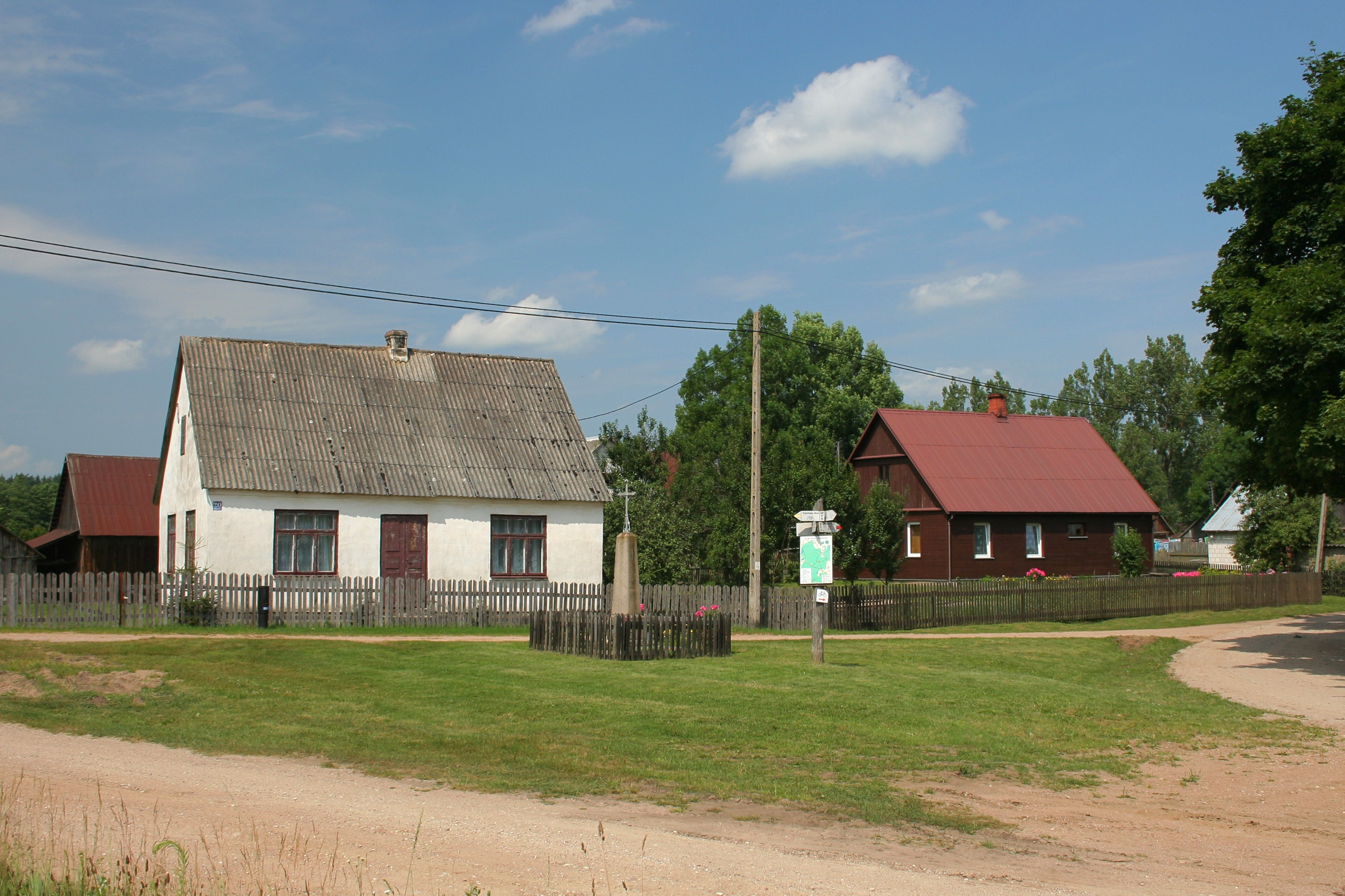

- Location within Poland
- Coordinates: 54°0′N 23°21′E
- Country: Poland
- Voivodeship: Podlaskie
- County: Sejny
- Gmina: Giby

Population (2021)
  - Total: 109
- Postal code: 16-506
- SIMC: 0757690
- Car plates: BSE

Sarnetki [sarˈnɛtki], is a village in the administrative district of Gmina Giby, within Sejny County, Podlaskie Voivodeship, in north-eastern Poland, close to the borders with Belarus and Lithuania.

== History ==
It was a royal village, located at the end of the 18th century in the Grodno County of the Trakai Voivodeship in the Polish–Lithuanian Commonwealth.

Four Polish citizens were murdered by Nazi Germany in the village during World War II.
