= Szlamy =

- Settlement
- Interactive map of Szlamy
- Location within Poland
- Coordinates: 53°57′55.08″N 23°29′40.92″E
- Country: Poland
- Voivodeship: Podlaskie
- County: Sejny
- Gmina: Giby
- Postal code: 16-506
- SIMC: 0757714
- Car plates: BSE

Szlamy [ˈʂlamɨ], is a settlement in the administrative district of Gmina Giby, within Sejny County, Podlaskie Voivodeship, in north-eastern Poland, close to the borders with Belarus and Lithuania.
