= Lipowo, Sejny County =

Lipowo
- Settlement
- Location within Poland
- Coordinates: 54°01′02″N 23°18′59″E
- Country: Poland
- Voivodeship: Podlaskie
- County: Sejny
- Gmina: Giby
- Postal code: 16-503
- SIMC: 0757795
- Car plates: BSE

Lipowo [liˈpɔvɔ], is a settlement in the administrative district of Gmina Giby, within Sejny County, Podlaskie Voivodeship, in north-eastern Poland, close to the borders with Belarus and Lithuania.
