= Kukle =

Kukle may refer to places:

- Kukle (Svitavy District), a municipality in the Pardubice Region of the Czech Republic
- Kukle, Poland, a village in Podlaskie Voivodeship in north-east Poland
