= Wronie Góry =

- Settlement
- Location within Poland
- Coordinates: 54°01′09″N 23°26′40″E
- Country: Poland
- Voivodeship: Podlaskie
- County: Sejny
- Gmina: Giby
- Postal code: 16-506
- SIMC: 0757849
- Car plates: BSE

Wronie Góry [ˈvrɔɲɛ ˈɡurɨ], is a settlement in the administrative district of Gmina Giby, within Sejny County, Podlaskie Voivodeship, in north-eastern Poland, close to the borders with Belarus and Lithuania.
