= Konstantynówka =

Konstantynówka may refer to the following places:

- Konstantynówka, Lublin Voivodeship (east Poland)
- Konstantynówka, Gmina Giby in Podlaskie Voivodeship (north-east Poland)
- Konstantynówka, Gmina Sejny in Podlaskie Voivodeship (north-east Poland)
