= Rygol, Sejny County =

Rygol
- Settlement
- Location within Poland
- Coordinates: 53°53′40″N 23°25′03″E
- Country: Poland
- Voivodeship: Podlaskie
- County: Sejny
- Gmina: Giby
- Postal code: 16-326
- SIMC: 0757424
- Car plates: BSE

Rygol [ˈrɨɡɔl], is a settlement in the administrative district of Gmina Giby, within Sejny County, Podlaskie Voivodeship, in north-eastern Poland, close to the borders with Belarus and Lithuania. It lies near the Czarną Hańczą river.
