= Wierśnie =

- Village
- Location within Poland
- Coordinates: 54°2′N 23°18′E
- Country: Poland
- Voivodeship: Podlaskie
- County: Sejny
- Gmina: Giby
- Population (2021): 49
- Postal code: 16-506
- SIMC: 0757750
- Car plates: BSE

Wierśnie [ˈvjɛrɕɲɛ], is a village in the administrative district of Gmina Giby, within Sejny County, Podlaskie Voivodeship, in north-eastern Poland, close to the borders with Belarus and Lithuania.

== History ==
In 1827 it was recorded that the population of the village was 66 inhabitants and 8 homes, in 1893 it was recorded that the village had a population of 90 inhabitants and 4 homes.

According to the First General Population Census, conducted in 1921, Wierśnie had 95 inhabitants, living in 18 houses. The vast majority of the village's inhabitants, 84 in number, declared the Old Believers' religion. The remainder reported a Roman Catholic religion (11 people). The religious division of the village inhabitants coincided with their national-ethnic structure, as 84 persons declared Russian ethnicity and the remaining 11 declared Polish ethnicity.
