= Muły, Sejny County =

Settlement in Gmina Giby, Poland

Muły
- Settlement
- Location within Poland
- Coordinates: 54°02′03″N 23°15′57″E
- Country: Poland
- Voivodeship: Podlaskie
- County: Sejny
- Gmina: Giby
- Postal code: 16-326
- SIMC: 0757418
- Car plates: BSE

Muły ([ˈmuwɨ]) is a settlement in the administrative district of Gmina Giby, within Sejny County, Podlaskie Voivodeship, in north-eastern Poland, close to the borders with Belarus and Lithuania.
