= Michał Kazimierz Radziwiłł =

Polish–Lithuanian noble (1635–1680)

Michał Kazimierz Radziwiłł Field Hetman of Lithuania
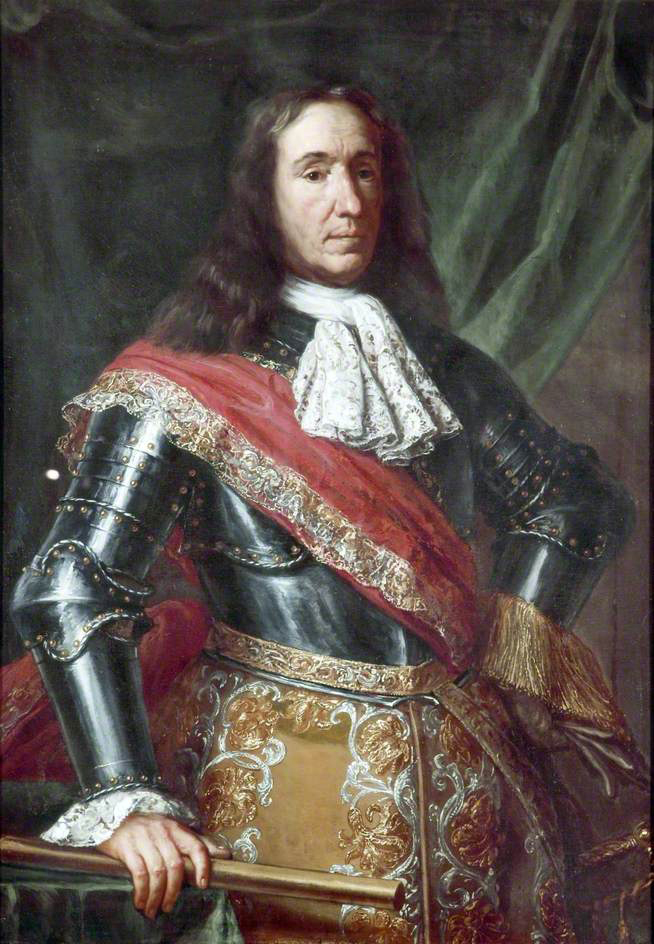
- Born: 26 October 1625; Nesvizh, Polish–Lithuanian Commonwealth
- Died: 14 November 1680 (aged 55); Bologna, Italy
- Spouse: Katarzyna Sobieska
- Children: with Katarzyna Sobieska: Boguslaw Krzysztof Radziwiłł; Tekla Adelaida Radziwiłł; Jan Radziwiłł; Ludwik Radziwiłł; Mikolaj Franciszek Radziwiłł; Jerzy Józef Radziwiłł; Karol Stanisław Radziwiłł
- Parent(s): Aleksander Ludwik Radziwiłł; Tekla Anna Wołłowicz

Prince Michał Kazimierz Radziwiłł (Lithuanian: Mykolas Kazimieras Radvila; 26 October 1625 or 26 October 1635 – 14 November 1680) was a Polish–Lithuanian noble and magnate. He is sometimes referred to as the first Michał Kazimierz Radziwiłł, to distinguish him from the other member of his family to use the name.

He held the following titles: Majorat of Nieśwież, Master of the Pantry of Lithuania (since 1652), Carver of Lithuania (since 1653), Cupbearer of Lithuania (since 1656), castellan of Vilnius (since 1661), Voivode of Vilnius (since 1667), Deputy Chancellor of Lithuania (1668) and Field Lithuanian Hetman. He was also a starost of Upytė, Przemyśl, Człuchów, Kamieniec, Chojnice, Lida, Telšiai, Rabsztyn, Choteń, Homel, Oster, Gulbin, and several other towns in the Polish–Lithuanian Commonwealth.

Between 2 May and 18 July 1661, he served as the Marshal of the ordinary Sejm held in Warsaw. He married Katarzyna Sobieska, the sister of the King of Poland John III Sobieski on 16 June 1658.

Unlike his cousins, Janusz Radziwiłł and Bogusław Radziwiłł, he was one of the members of the Radziwiłł family who valiantly fought in the defence of the Polish–Lithuanian Commonwealth during The Deluge.
