= Dworczysko, Gmina Giby =

Dworczysko
- Village
- Interactive map of Dworczysko
- Location within Poland
- Coordinates: 53°55′57″N 23°22′48″E
- Country: Poland
- Voivodeship: Podlaskie
- County: Sejny
- Gmina: Giby
- Population (2021): 30
- Postal code: 16-506
- SIMC: 0757387
- Car plates: BSE

Dworczysko [dvɔrˈt͡ʂɨskɔ], is a village in the administrative district of Gmina Giby, within Sejny County, Podlaskie Voivodeship, in north-eastern Poland, close to the borders with Belarus and Lithuania.

== Geography ==
A village located in the heart of the Augustów Primeval Forest, the Czarna Hańcza River flows through there. This is also where Karol Wojtyła went canoeing. There are several campsites for canoeists in the village.

== History ==
in 1881 it was recorded that the village population was 20 people and 5 homes.
