= Giby =

- Village
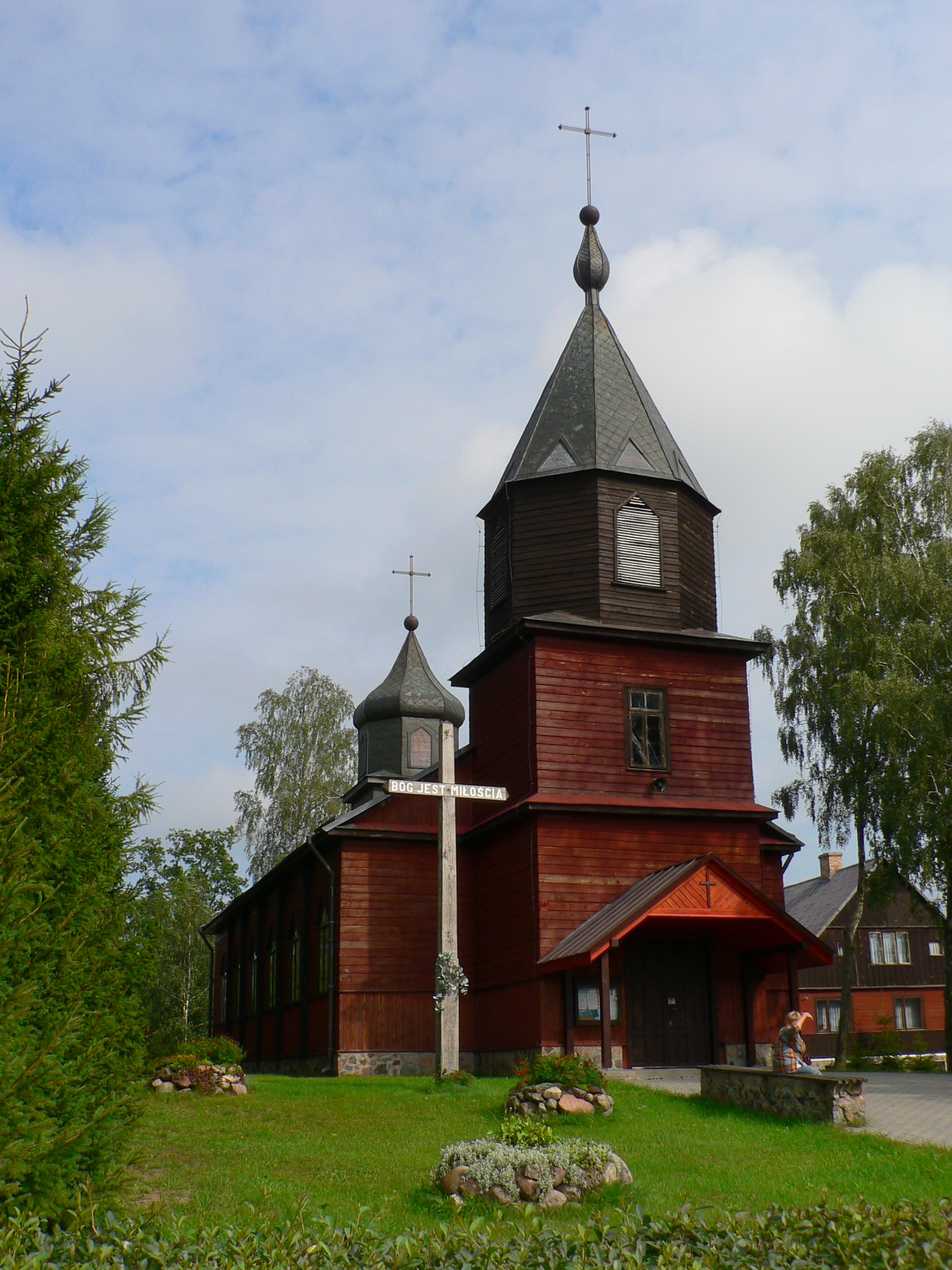
- Saint Anne Church
- Interactive map of Giby
- Location within Poland
- Coordinates: 54°2′N 23°22′E
- Country: Poland
- Voivodeship: Podlaskie
- County: Sejny
- Gmina: Giby
- Population (2011): 538
- Postal code: 16-506
- Area code: +48 87
- SIMC: 0757499

Giby ([ˈɡibɨ]; Lithuanian: Gibai) is a village in Sejny County, Podlaskie Voivodeship, in north-eastern Poland, close to the borders with Belarus and Lithuania. It is the seat of the gmina (administrative district) called Gmina Giby.

The village was established in 1594.

Today's Catholic church of St. Anne (1912) originally served Old Believers in Pogorzelec village, from where it was moved to Giby in 1982.

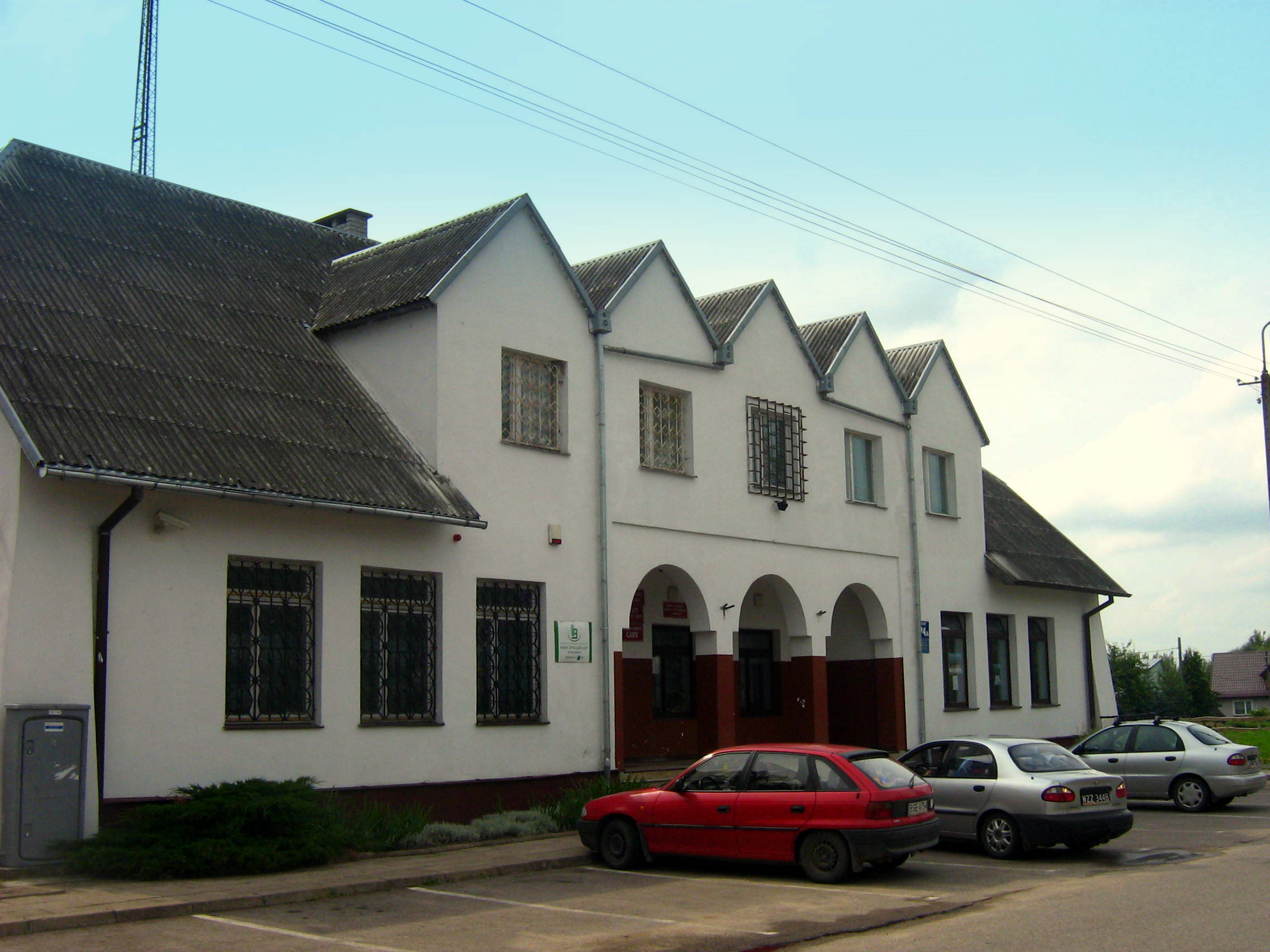

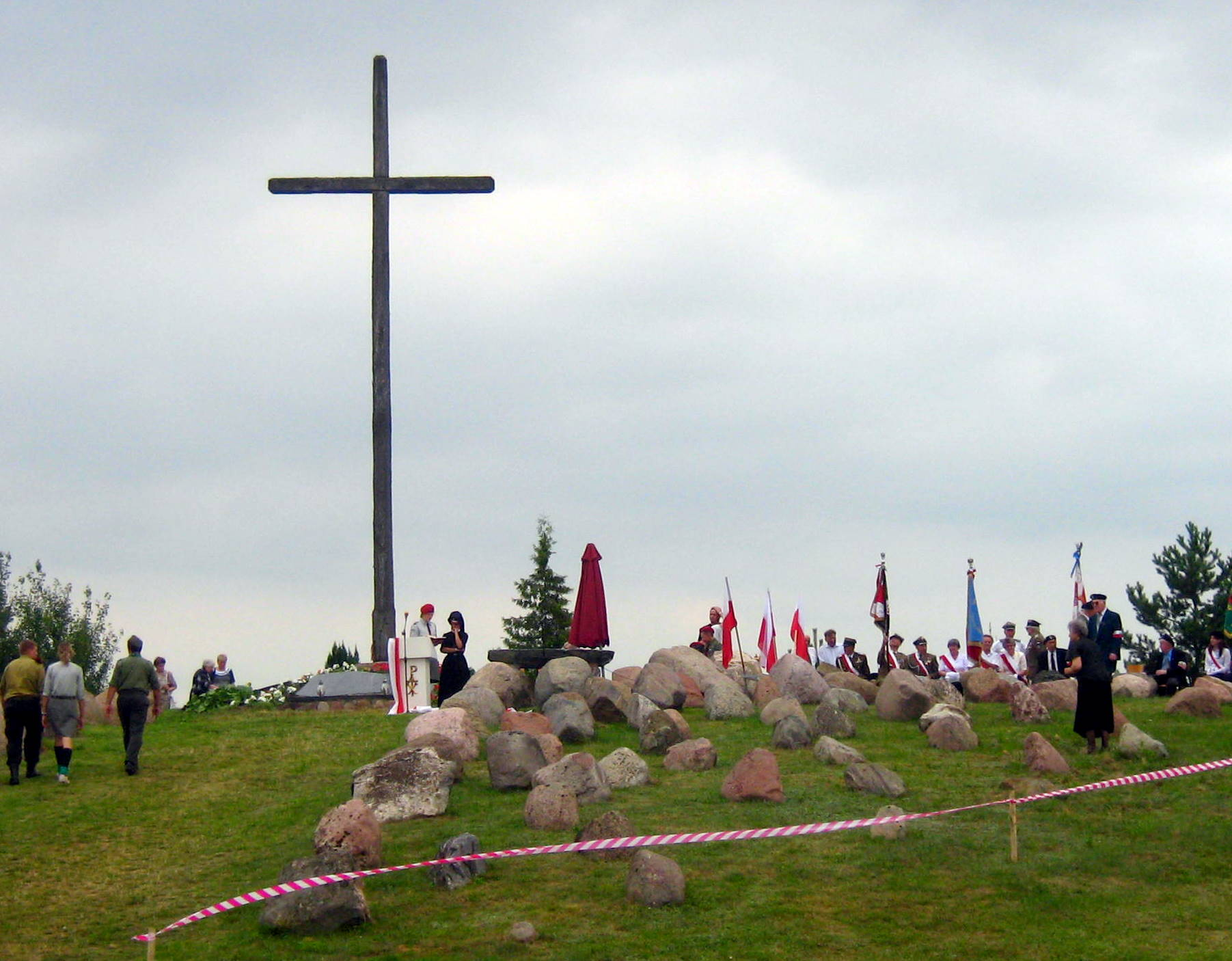

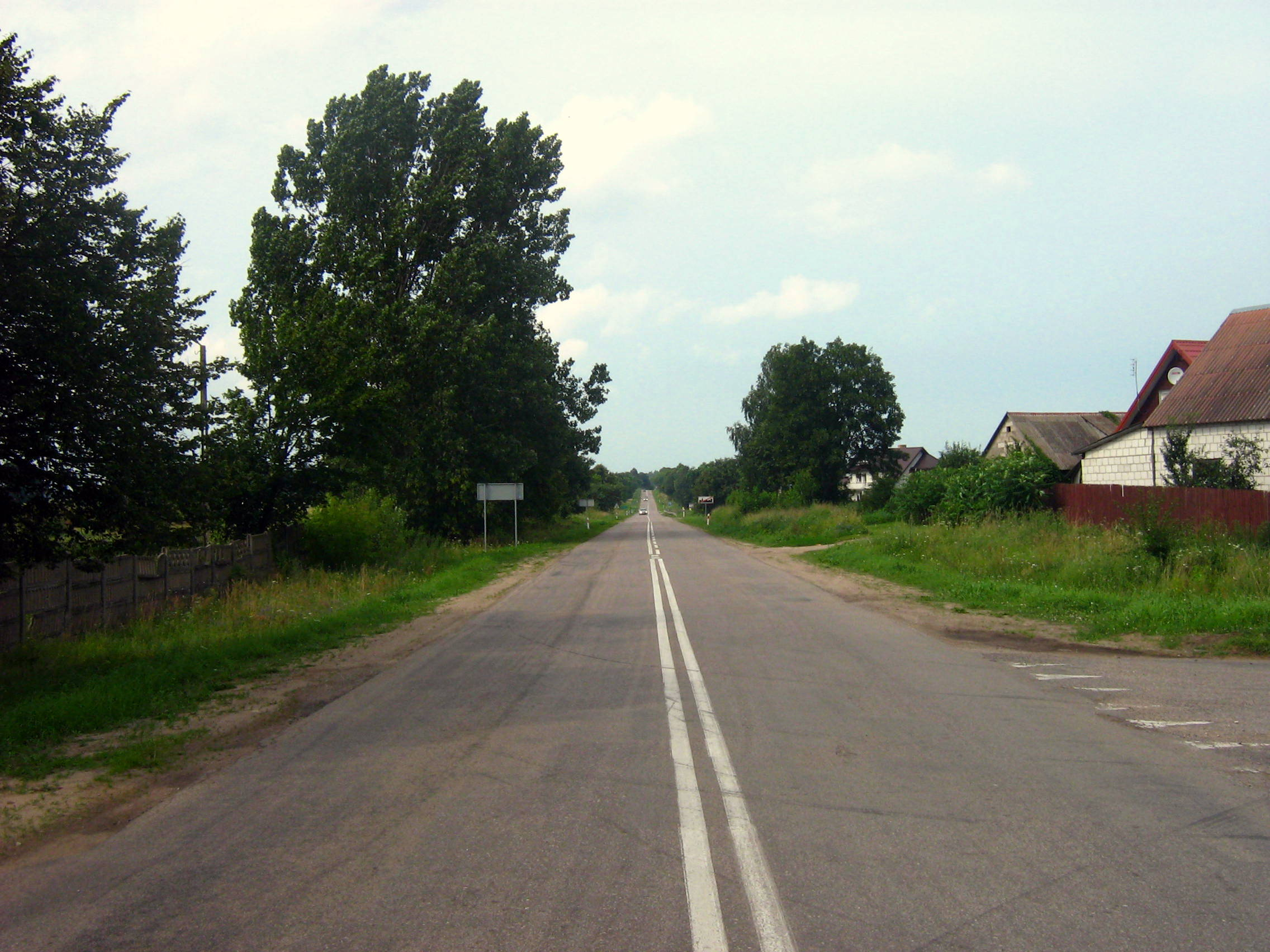

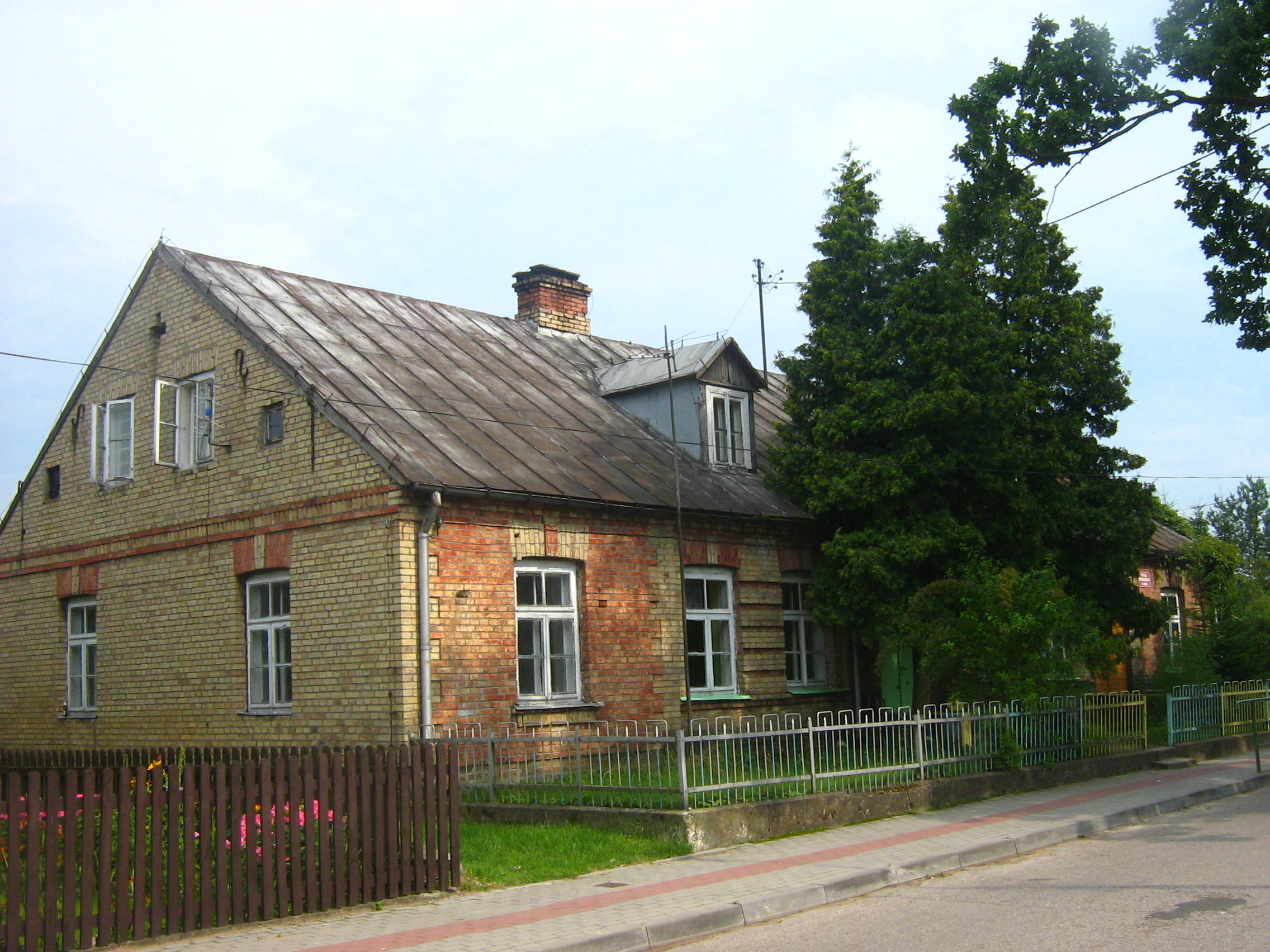

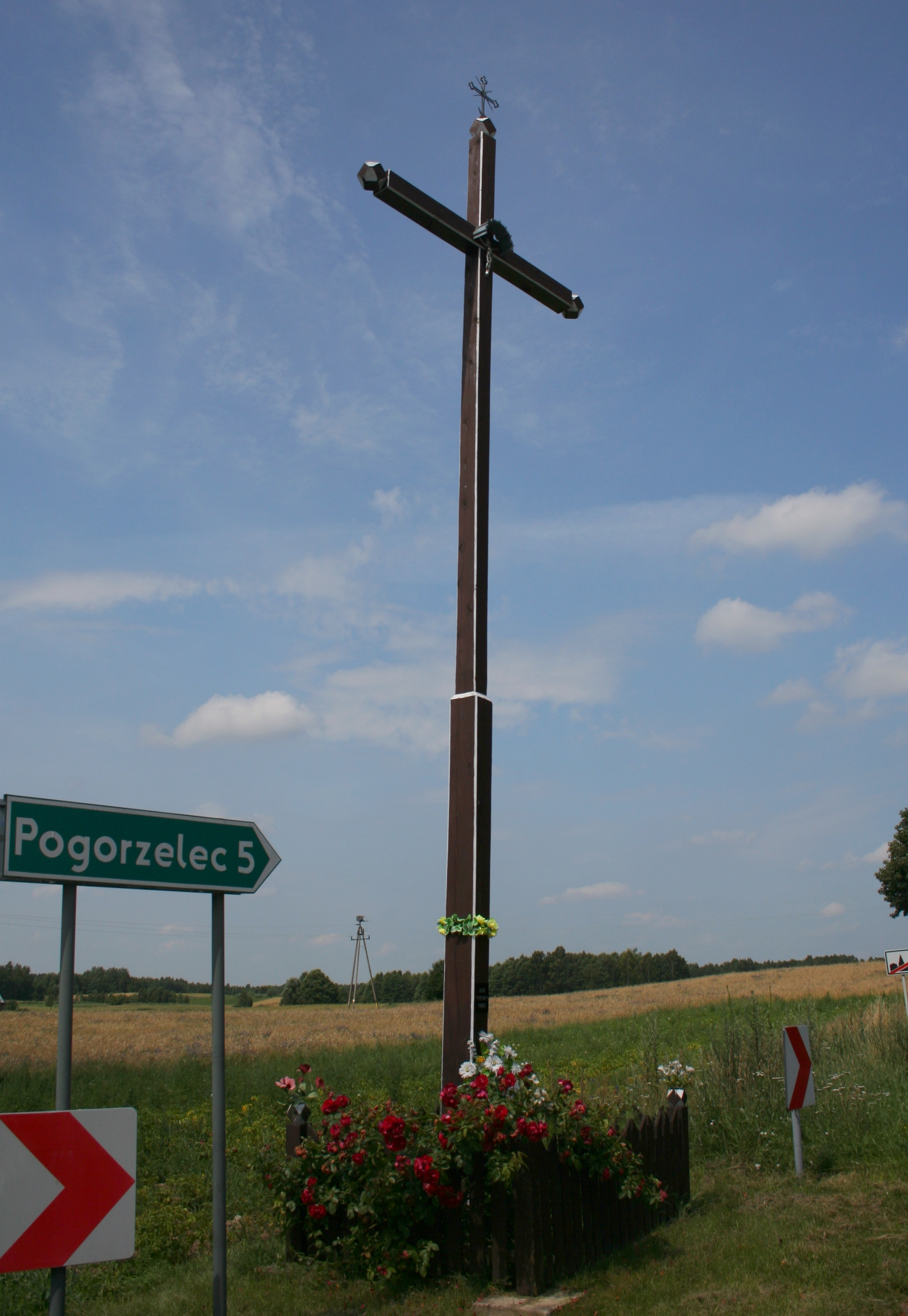

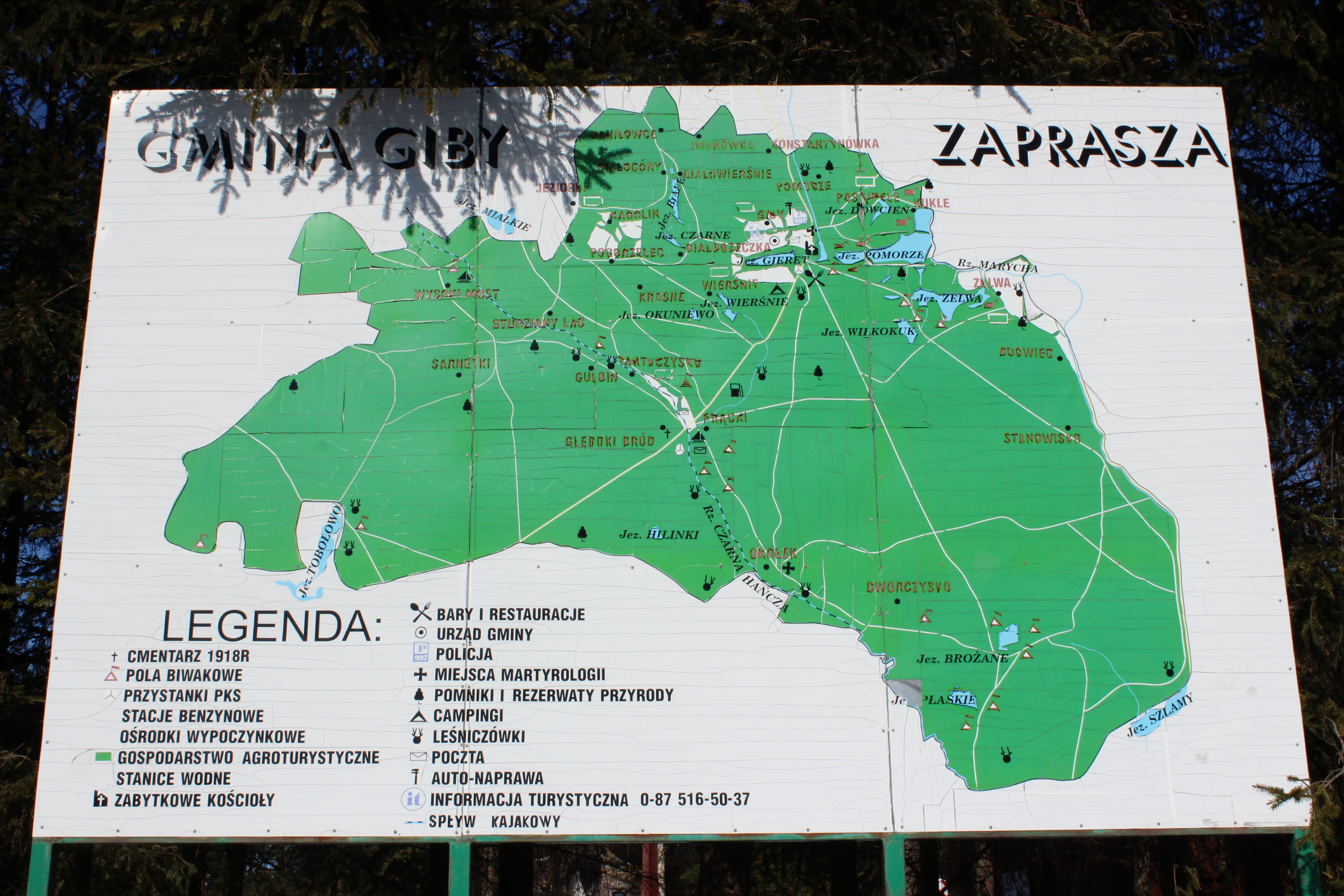

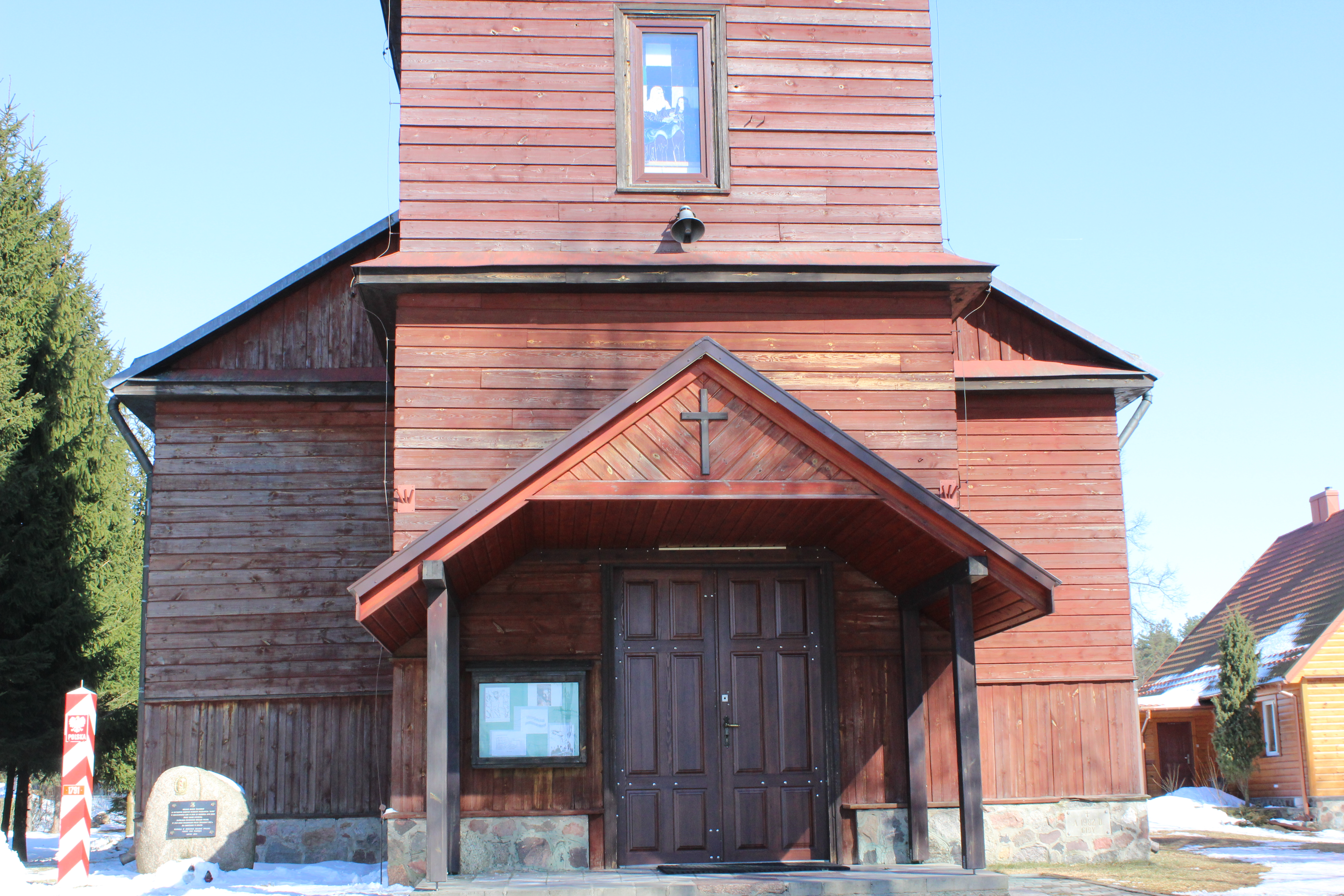

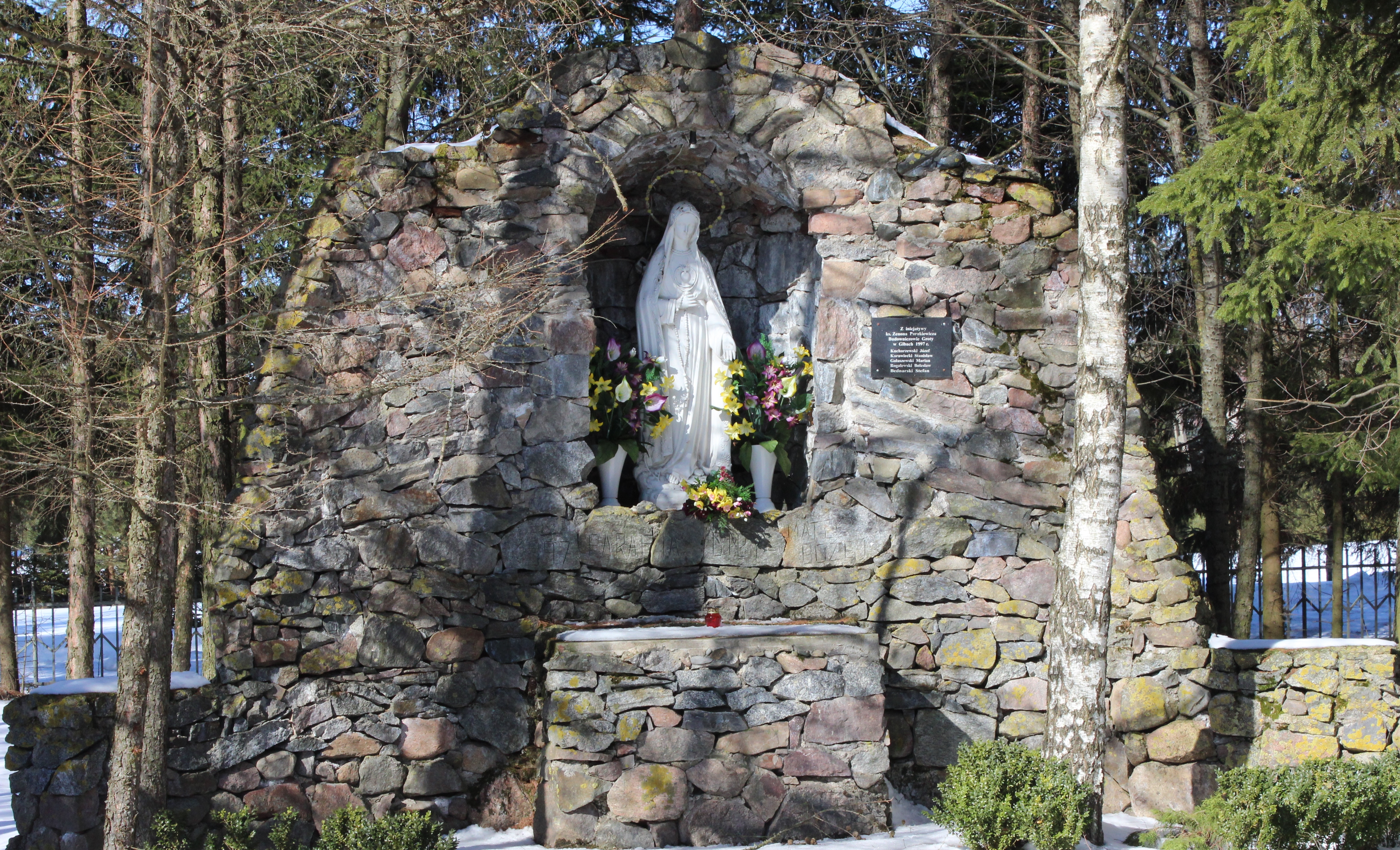

== See also ==
- Augustów roundup

== Sources ==
- VLKK (2002). "Atvirkštinis lietuvių kalboje vartojamų tradicinių Lenkijos vietovardžių formų sąrašas" (PDF). VLKK (in Lithuanian). Archived from the original (PDF) on 2012-02-14.
