= Augustów roundup =

WWII military operation

- Part of Anti-communist resistance in Poland (1944–1953)
Date	July 10–25, 1945
Location	Suwałki and Augustów regions, Poland
Result	The dismantling of the Polish underground and the last opposition to People’s Poland in the region

Belligerents
Soviet Union	Polish Underground

Commanders and leaders
Unknown	Unknown

Strength
Unknown	over 3000

Casualties and losses
	2,000 captured and later executed, 600 deported

The Augustów roundup (Polish Obława augustowska) was a military operation against the Polish World War II anti-communist partisans and sympathizers following the Soviet takeover of Poland. The operation was undertaken by Soviet forces with the assistance of Polish collaborationist units, and conducted from July 10 to July 25, 1945, in Suwałki and Augustów region (contemporary Podlaskie) of northern Polish People's Republic.

Out of 2,000 arrested by the Soviet forces, about 600 have disappeared. They are presumed to have been executed and buried in an unknown location in present-day Russia or Belarus. Polish Institute of National Remembrance has declared the 1945 Augustów roundup "the largest crime committed by the Soviets on Polish lands after World War II". The crime has been called "second Katyn", "small Katyn" or "little Katyn" in today's Poland, in reference to the Katyn massacre that occurred in 1940.

== Background ==
In the aftermath of the joint German-Soviet invasion of Poland, the Polish government evacuated to the West and created the Polish Underground State. While no war was declared between Poland and the Soviet Union, the relations were tense, and eventually broke down in 1943 in the aftermath of the revelations of the Katyn massacre. The Soviets eventually created their own Polish communist puppet government, the Polish Committee of National Liberation (Polski Komitet Wyzwolenia Narodowego, PKWN) and refused to deal with the Underground State just like they refused to deal with the government-in-exile; its leaders and soldiers on "liberated" Polish territories were persecuted. While the Underground State's military arm, Armia Krajowa, officially disbanded on January 19, 1945, to avoid armed conflict with the Soviets and a civil war, some refused to lay down their arms; others found it simply difficult to return to civilian life, as those with ties to non-communist resistance were discriminated against by the authorities.

== Operation ==
The operation was undertaken by Soviet forces of the Red Army, the NKVD and SMERSH with the assistance of Polish UB and LWP units, and conducted from July 12 to July 28, 1945, in the Suwałki and Augustów regions of northern Polish People's Republic. This operation included not only Polish communist territories, but also former Polish territories annexed by the Soviet Union and given to the Lithuanian SSR (see Soviet occupation of Lithuania).

== Aftermath ==
More than 2,000 Polish (some estimate as many as 7,000) alleged anti-communist fighters and sympathizers were arrested and interrogated in two waves of mass arrests. The majority were detained in Russian internment camps. The last ones were released and returned to Poland in 1956. 600 have disappeared, their fate uncertain to this day. More recent research puts the number of those disappeared at 592 or 593. They include 27 women (including pregnant ones) and 15 teenagers. The "Augustów Missing" are presumed to have been executed and buried in an unknown location in present-day Russia.

Despite demands from many Polish citizens for this incident to be investigated, it was denied by both the Soviet and Polish communist governments. As late as the 1980s, the last decade of the Polish People's Republic, government representative Jerzy Urban declared that the Polish government had "no evidence to support the theory that a group of Polish citizens disappeared in the Augustów region in 1945." After the fall of communism, the new Polish government supported the investigation, carried out by the Institute of National Remembrance (IPN), which classified it as a communist crime. While it is commonly accepted that the Soviet Union, backed by communist Polish forces, arrested and likely executed approximately 600 Polish citizens connected to the anti-communist resistance, no conclusive information on their exact fate and resting place has yet been found. In 1995 the Russian government confirmed that 590 Polish citizens were arrested and 579 were put on trial, but that there is no information on their subsequent fate. In 2005 IPN noted that the research possibilities on Polish territory had been exhausted; even the archives of Polish secret services involved in the operations were analysed but contained only cursory information that they were aiding the Soviets without being given much information. However, Polish requests to the Russian government for support in the investigation were not productive, and many have been ignored. A symbolic monument has been built in the village of Giby, where a mass grave was found (these were later proven to belong to German soldiers from a nearby field hospital).

In May 2011, Russian historian Nikita Petrov declared that he found a KGB document proving that the Poles were executed by NKVD. This has evoked interest in Polish mainstream press and from the IPN, which declared that it would seek the documents located by Pietrov for further analysis. On 18 April 2012 the Polish Institute of National Remembrance announced that it has received the Soviet-era documents concerning the executions.

== Gallery ==
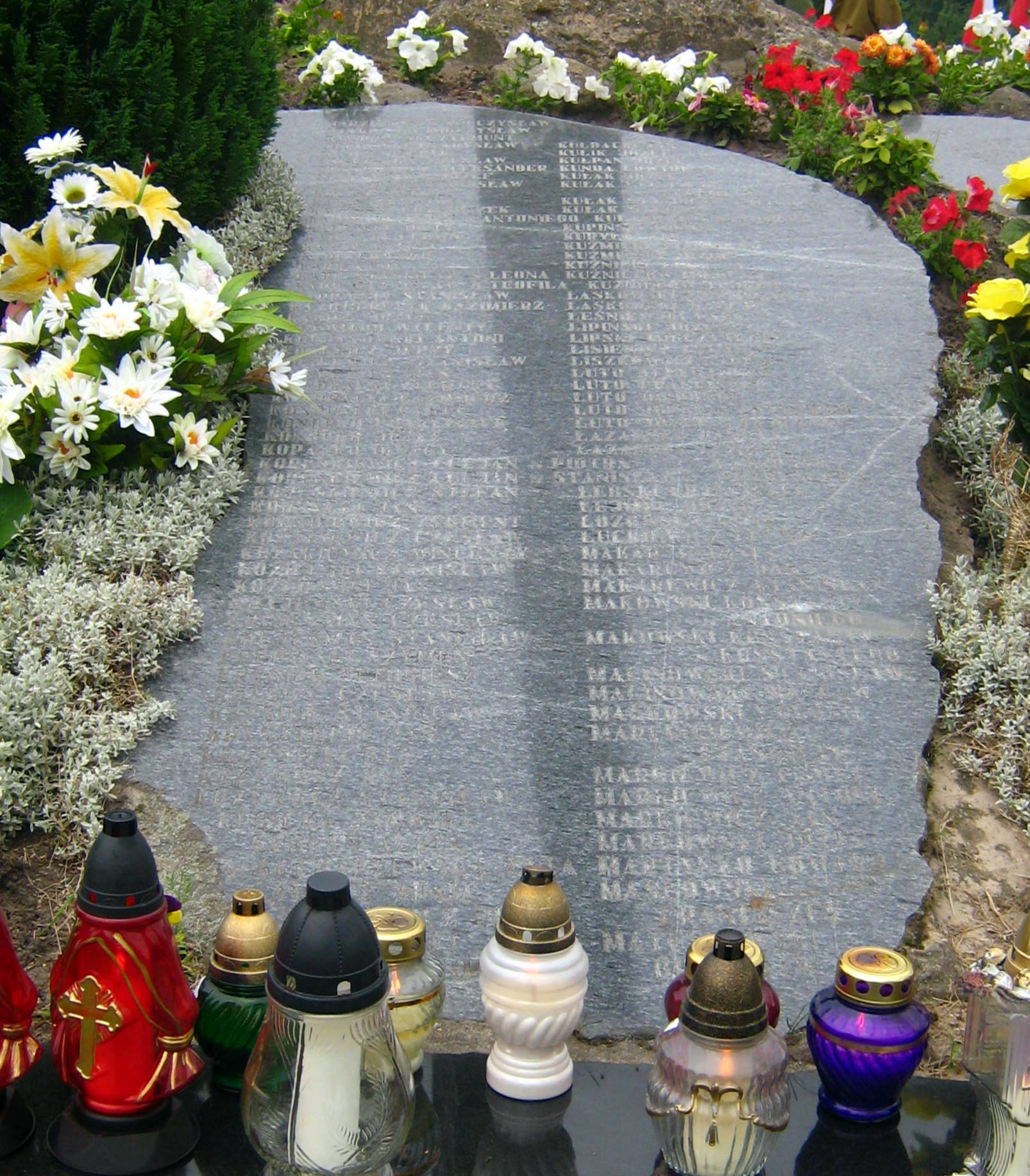
One of several tablets in Giby, containing the names of the disappeared (murdered) Polish citizens

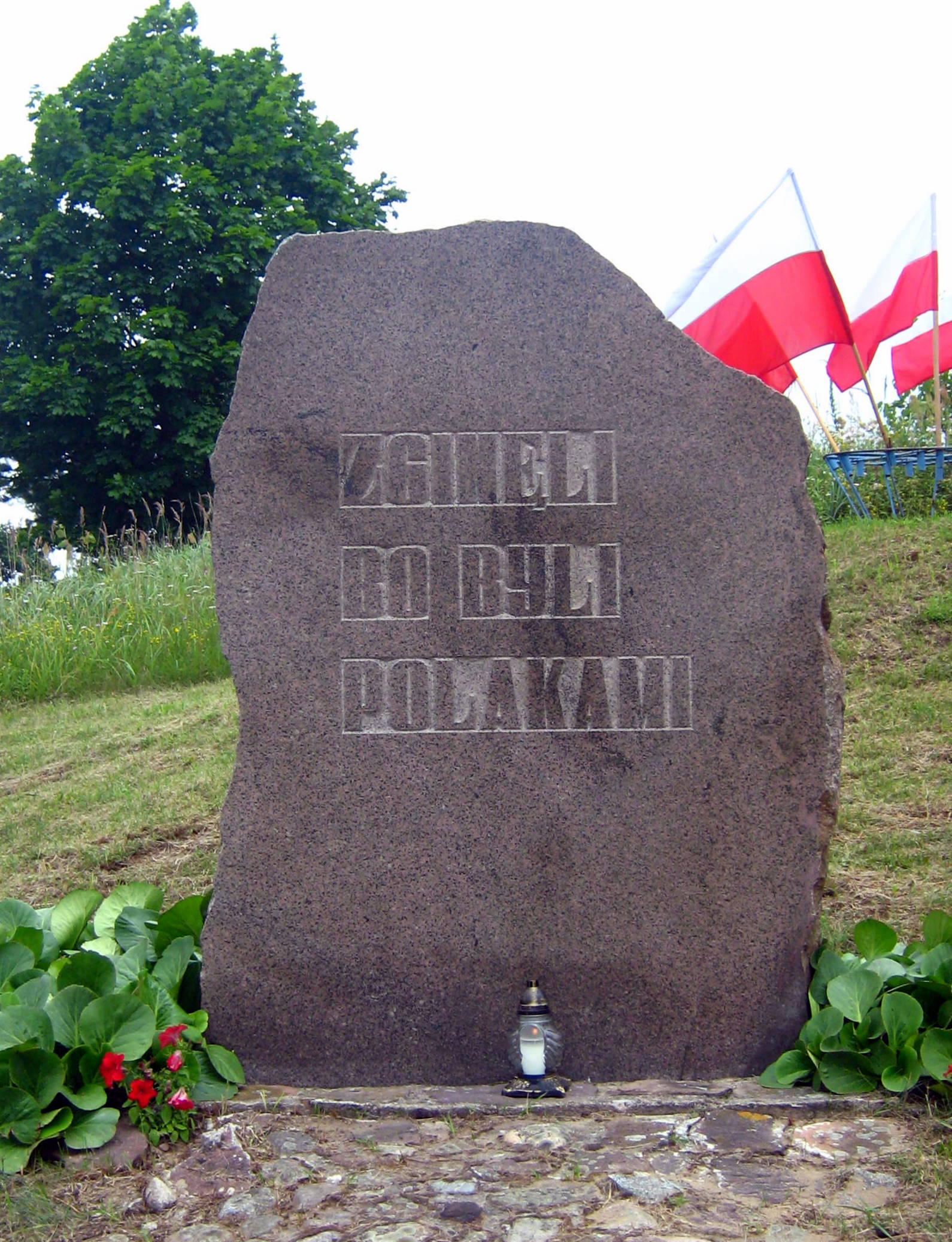
Monument to the victims of Augustów chase in Giby, reading: "Died for being Poles"

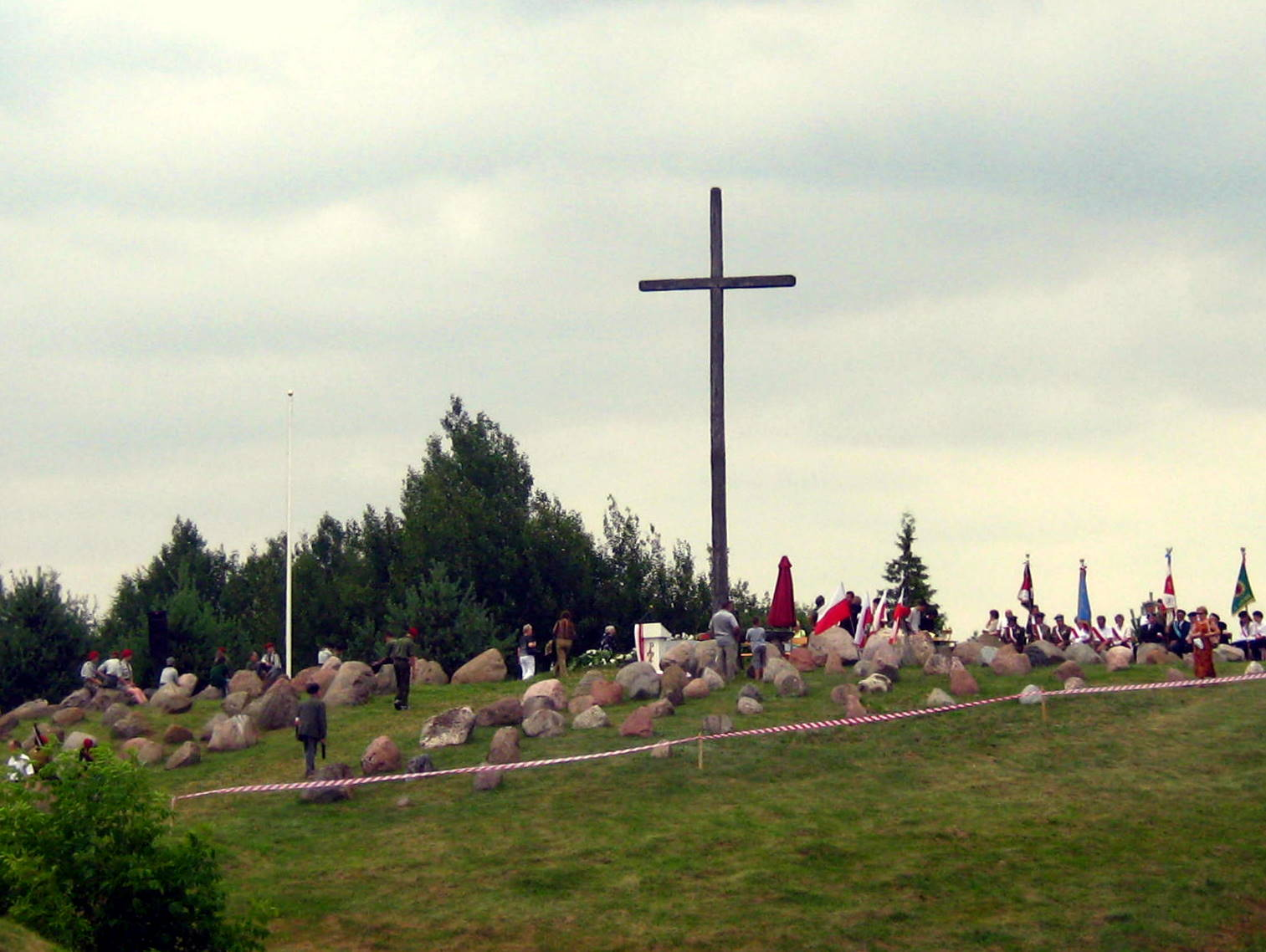
Site of the monument to the victims of Augustów chase in Giby (Podlaskie Voivodeship). Memorial procession visible in the background.

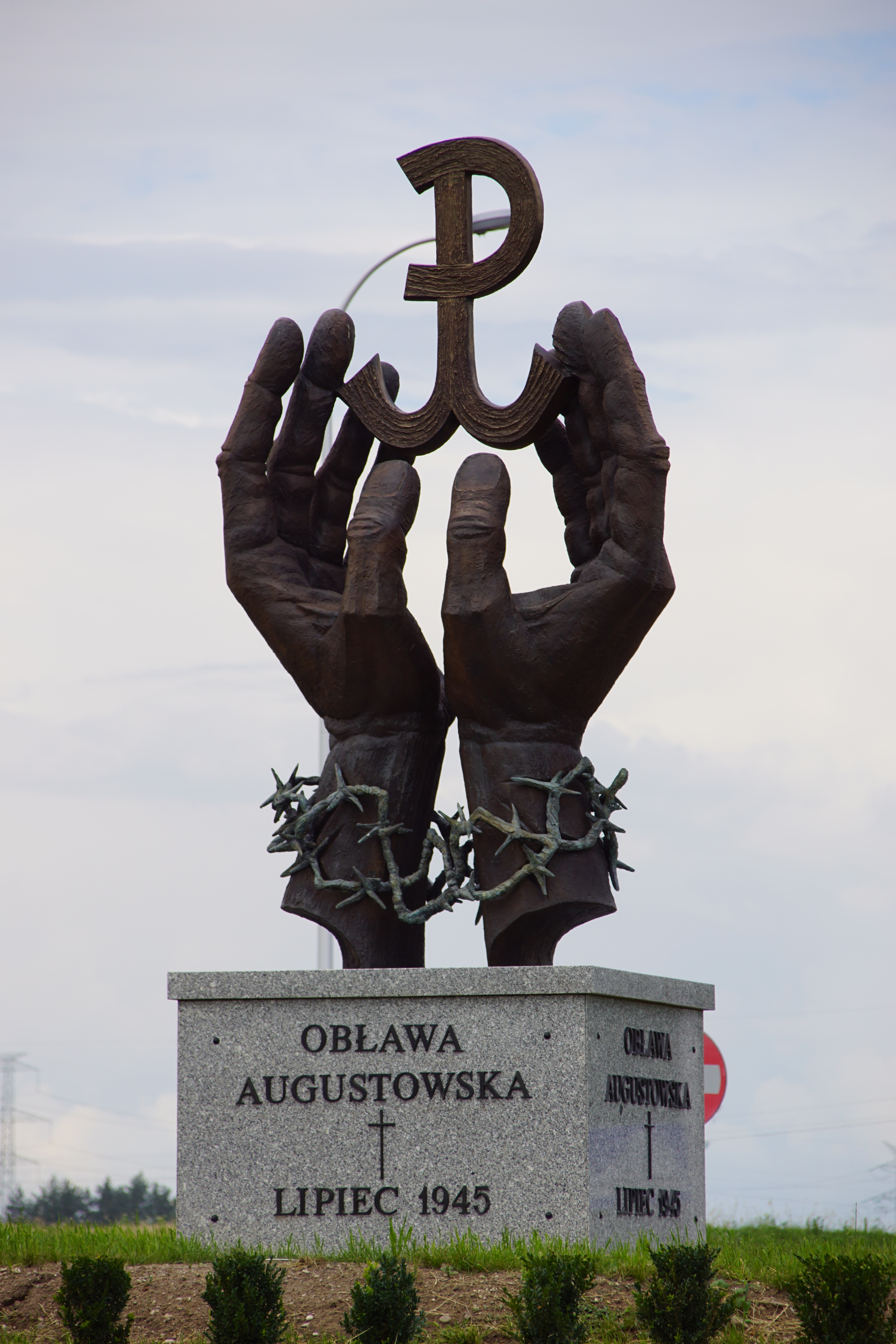
Monument to the victims of Augustów chase in Suwałki

== See also ==
- Anti-Soviet partisans
