= Konstantynówka, Gmina Giby =

Konstantynówka
- Village
- Location within Poland
- Coordinates: 54°4′7″N 23°20′50″E
- Country: Poland
- Voivodeship: Podlaskie
- County: Sejny
- Gmina: Giby
- Population (2021): 21
- Postal code: 16-506
- SIMC: 0757571
- Car plates: BSE

Konstantynówka [kɔnstantɨˈnufka], is a village in the administrative district of Gmina Giby, within Sejny County, Podlaskie Voivodeship, in north-eastern Poland, close to the borders with Belarus and Lithuania. It lies off national road 16.

== History ==
In 1921 the village had 9 houses and 50 inhabitants, including 19 Catholics, 16 Old Believers and 15 Orthodox Christians.
