= Kukle, Poland =

Kukle
- Village
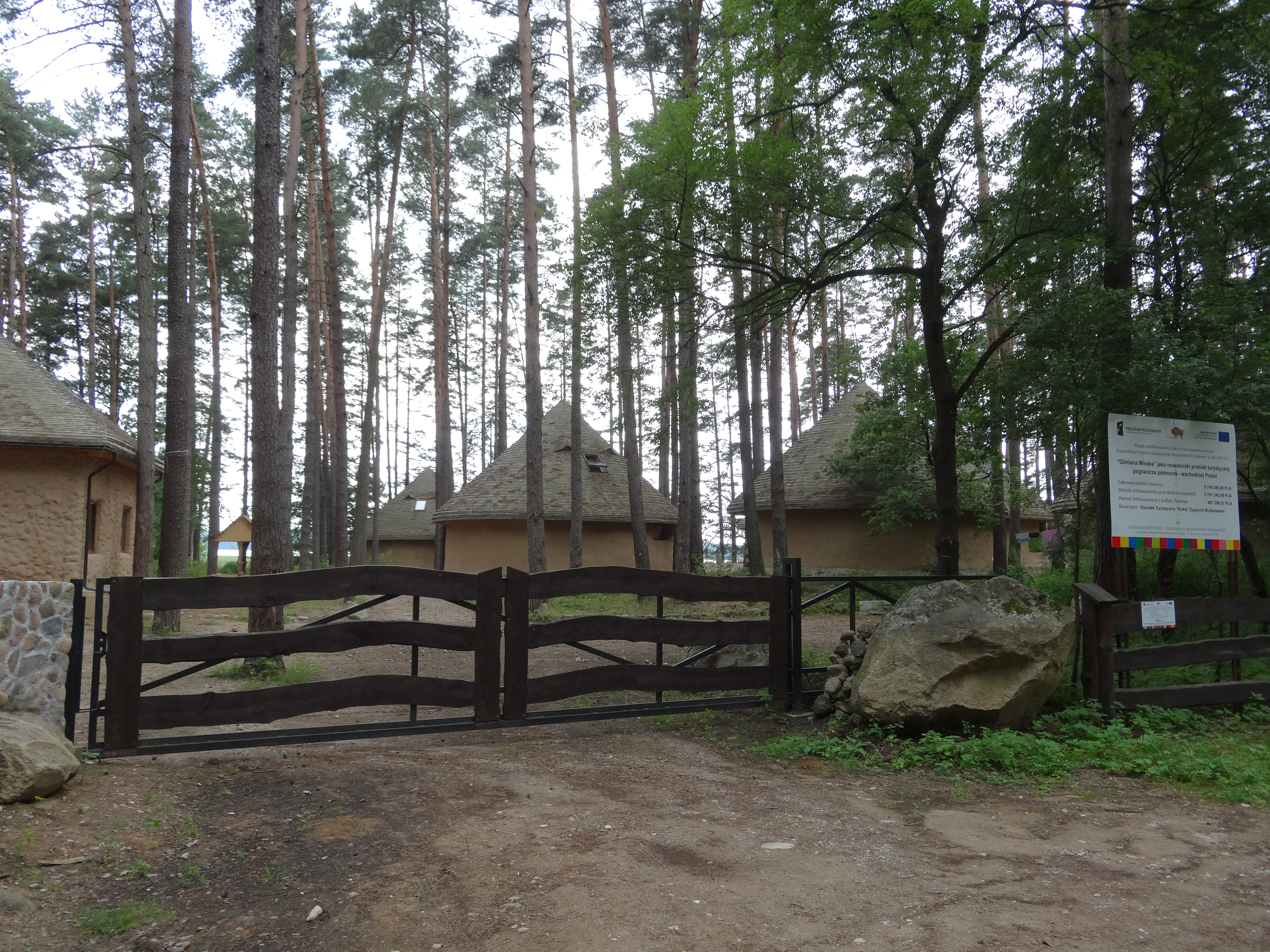
- Camping grounds in Kukle

- Location within Poland
- Coordinates: 54°3′N 23°25′E
- Country: Poland
- Voivodeship: Podlaskie
- County: Sejny
- Gmina: Giby
- Population (2021): 71
- Postal code: 16-506
- SIMC: 0757594
- Car plates: BSE

Kukle ([ˈkuklɛ]; Lithuanian: Kukliai) is a village in the administrative district of Gmina Giby, within Sejny County, Podlaskie Voivodeship, in north-eastern Poland, close to the borders with Belarus and Lithuania.

== History ==
=== Polish-Lithuanian Commonwealth ===
The village was organized as a result of a spear survey carried out in the area of the Berżnice estate between 1547 and 1561 and was originally called Pomorzany. Which originated from the location of the village on Lake Pomerania and referred to the people living on this lake. In 1558 the village comprised 10 voloks and had 14 farmers. The villages of Berżnice starosty, including Kukle, suffered severely as a result of the Swedish Deluge in 1655-1660, which is evidenced by the inventory data of 1679, according to which 7 farmers remained in Kukle, and out of 10 voloks only 4.75 were settled voloks, while the remaining 5.25 voloks were empty ones. At this time, the village was also renamed Kukle, named after the owners of the village. From the Lithuanian Kukla family. The village again suffered losses during the Northern War in 1700-1721 and an epidemic around 1710, which is reflected in the inventory data from 1736, according to which there were only 3 farmers in Kukle that year. The number of farmers increased to 5 in 1765 and remained at the same level in 1789. In 1789 Kukle had a population of 24 inhabitants.

=== Congress Poland ===
in 1827 - 83 inhabitants in 11 houses, at in 1883 the population was numbered at 157 inhabitants in 28 houses.

=== Second Polish Republic ===
In 1921 it was recorded that 134 residents lived in 21 houses.

== Notable people ==
Maria Andrejczyk - Olympic vice-champion for the Tokyo olympics, Polish record-holder in javelin throw.

Czesław Daniłowicz - Polish computer scientist, doctor habilitated engineer, professor of Wrocław University of Technology.

== Sources ==
- VLKK (2002). "Atvirkštinis lietuvių kalboje vartojamų tradicinių Lenkijos vietovardžių formų sąrašas" (PDF). VLKK (in Lithuanian). Archived from the original (PDF) on 2012-02-14.
