= Gulbin =

- Village
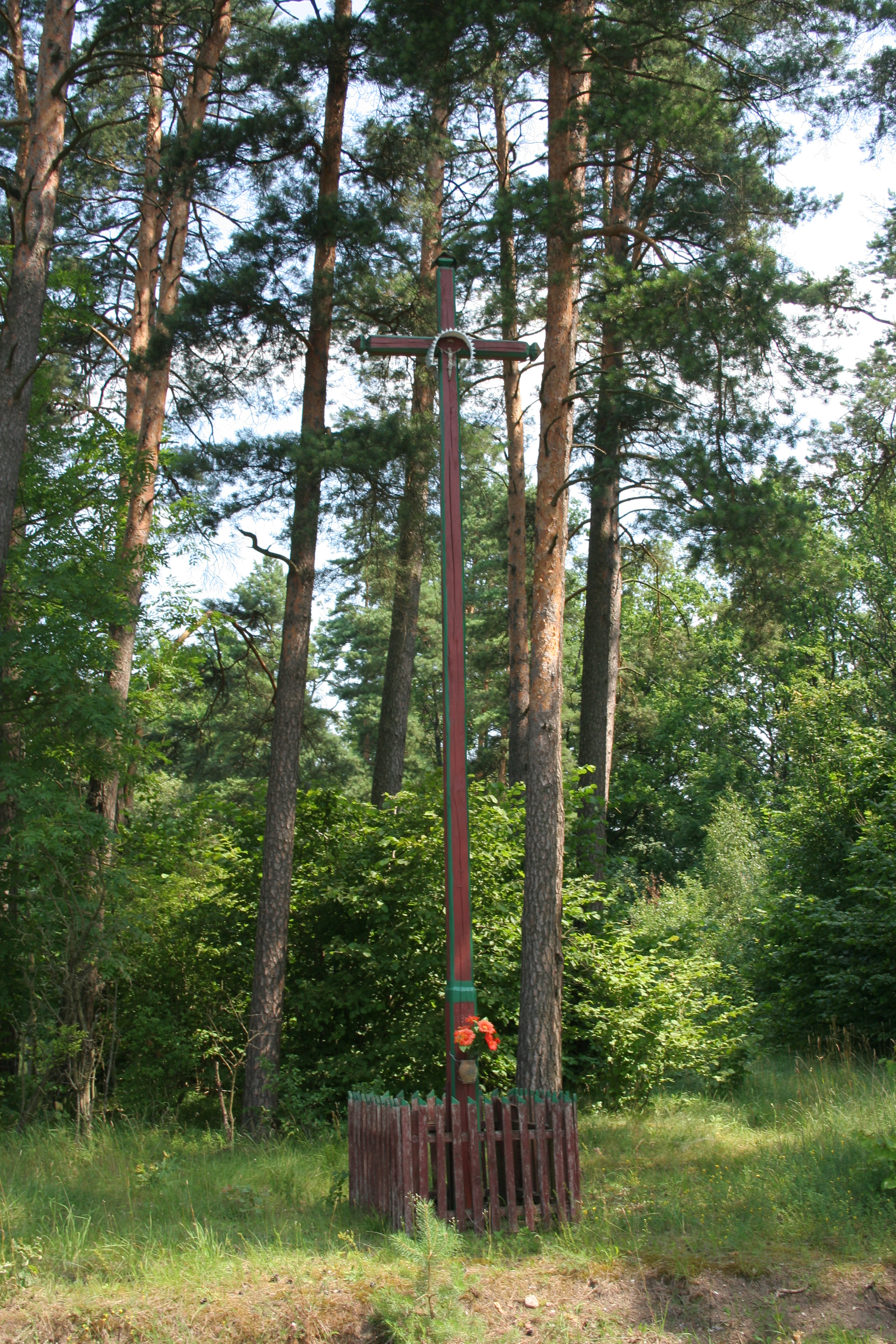
- Cross in Gulbin

- Location within Poland
- Coordinates: 54°0′4″N 23°15′27″E
- Country: Poland
- Voivodeship: Podlaskie
- County: Sejny
- Gmina: Giby
- Population (2021): 20
- Time zone: UTC+1 (CET)
  - Summer (DST): UTC+2 (CEST)
- Postal code: 16-506
- SIMC: 0757520
- Car plates: BSE

Gulbin [ˈɡulbin], is a village in the administrative district of Gmina Giby, within Sejny County, Podlaskie Voivodeship, in north-eastern Poland, close to the borders with Belarus and Lithuania. It lies near the Czarna Hańcza river.

== History ==
The royal village was located at the end of the 18th century in the Grodno County of the Trakai Voivodeship in the Polish–Lithuanian Commonwealth.
