= Baraki, Podlaskie Voivodeship =

Baraki
- Settlement
- Location within Poland
- Coordinates: 53°57′13″N 23°19′57″E
- Country: Poland
- Voivodeship: Podlaskie
- County: Sejny
- Gmina: Giby
- Time zone: UTC+1 (CET)
  - Summer (DST): UTC+2 (CEST)
- Postal code: 16-506
- Vehicle registration: BSE

Baraki ([baˈraki]) is a settlement in the administrative district of Gmina Giby, within Sejny County, Podlaskie Voivodeship, in north-eastern Poland, close to the borders with Belarus and Lithuania.

== History ==
From the 13th century to 1795, the village was administratively located in the Trakai Voivodeship of the Grand Duchy of Lithuania and Polish–Lithuanian Commonwealth.
