= Białorzeczka =

- Village
- Location within Poland
- Coordinates: 54°3′N 23°19′E
- Country: Poland
- Voivodeship: Podlaskie
- County: Sejny
- Gmina: Giby
- Population: 36
- Postal code: 16-506
- Car plates: BSE

Białorzeczka [bjawɔˈʐɛt͡ʂka], is a village in the administrative district of Gmina Giby, within Sejny County, Podlaskie Voivodeship, in north-eastern Poland, close to the border with Lithuania.

== History ==
In 1890 the population of the village was numbered at 40 people and 6 homes.

According to the First General Population Census carried out in 1921, Białorzeczko had 9 houses and was inhabited by 62 people. At that time, the village had a bi-national and bi-confessional character, as 51 inhabitants of the village declared Roman Catholicism, while the remaining 11 declared Old Believers' religion. The religious division of Białorzeczko's inhabitants coincided with their national-ethnic structure, as 51 people declared Polish nationality, while the remaining 11 declared Russian national identity.
