= Gmina Giby =

Gmina Giby Giby Commune
- Gmina
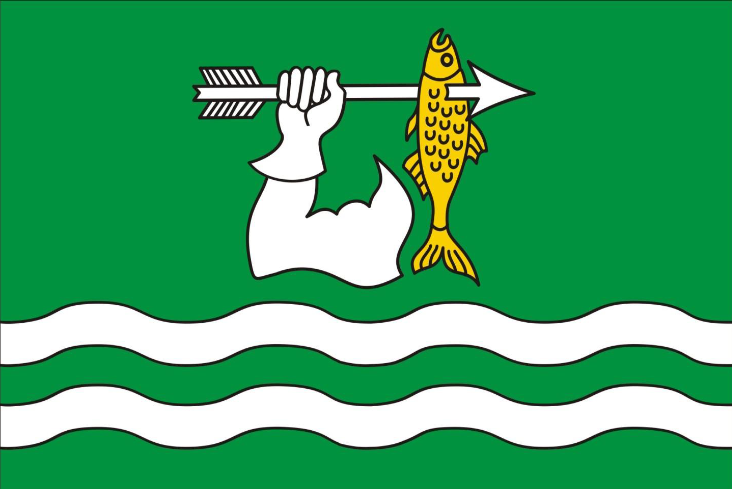
- Flag Coat of arms

- Gmina Giby within the Sejny County
- Coordinates (Giby): 54°2′N 23°22′E
- Country: Poland
- Voivodeship: Podlaskie
- County: Sejny
- Seat: Giby

Area
  - Total: 323.57 km^{2} (124.93 sq mi)

Population (2006)
  - Total: 2,970
  - Density: 9.18/km^{2} (23.8/sq mi)

Gmina Giby is a rural gmina (administrative district) in Sejny County, Podlaskie Voivodeship, in north-eastern Poland, on the border with Belarus and Lithuania. Its seat is the village of Giby, which lies approximately 10 kilometres (6 mi) south of Sejny and 103 km (64 mi) north of the regional capital Białystok.

The gmina covers an area of 323.57 square kilometres (124.9 sq mi), and as of 2006 its total population is 2,970.

== Villages ==
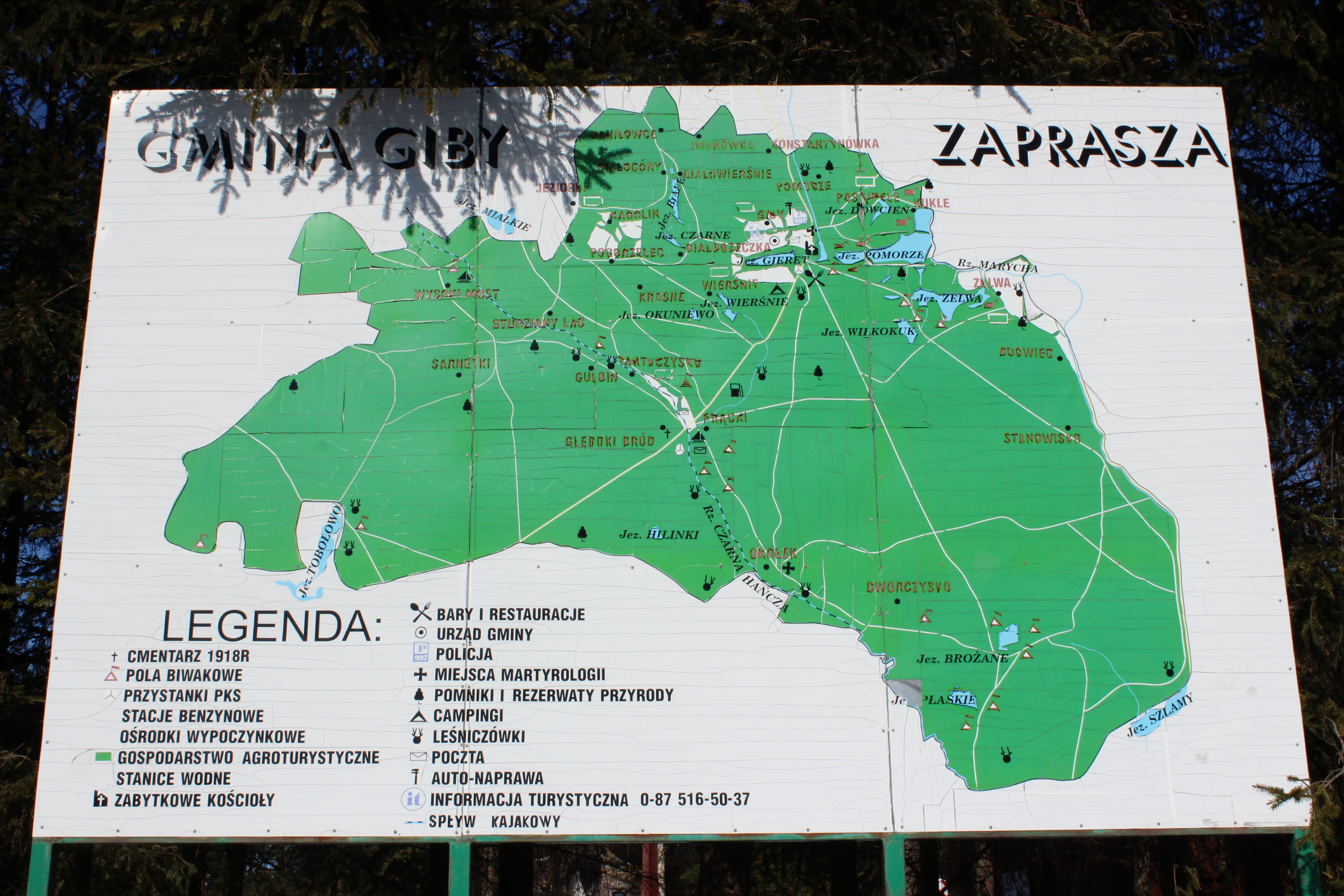
Map of Gmina Giby

Gmina Giby contains the villages and settlements of Aleksiejówka, Baraki, Białogóry, Białorzeczka, Białowierśnie, Budwieć, Chylinki, Czarna Hańcza, Daniłowce, Dworczysko, Dziemianówka, Frącki, Gibasówka, Giby, Głęboka Biel, Głęboki Bród, Gulbin, Iwanówka, Karolin, Konstantynówka, Krasne, Kukle, Lipowo, Muły, Okółek, Pogorzelec, Pomorze, Posejnele, Rygol, Sarnetki, Stanowisko, Studziany Las, Szlamy, Tartaczysko, Wielki Bór, Wierśnie, Wiłkokuk, Wronie Góry, Wysoki Most and Zelwa.

== Neighbouring gminas ==
Gmina Giby is bordered by the gminas of Krasnopol, Nowinka, Płaska and Sejny. It also borders Belarus and Lithuania.
