= Białogóry =

- Village
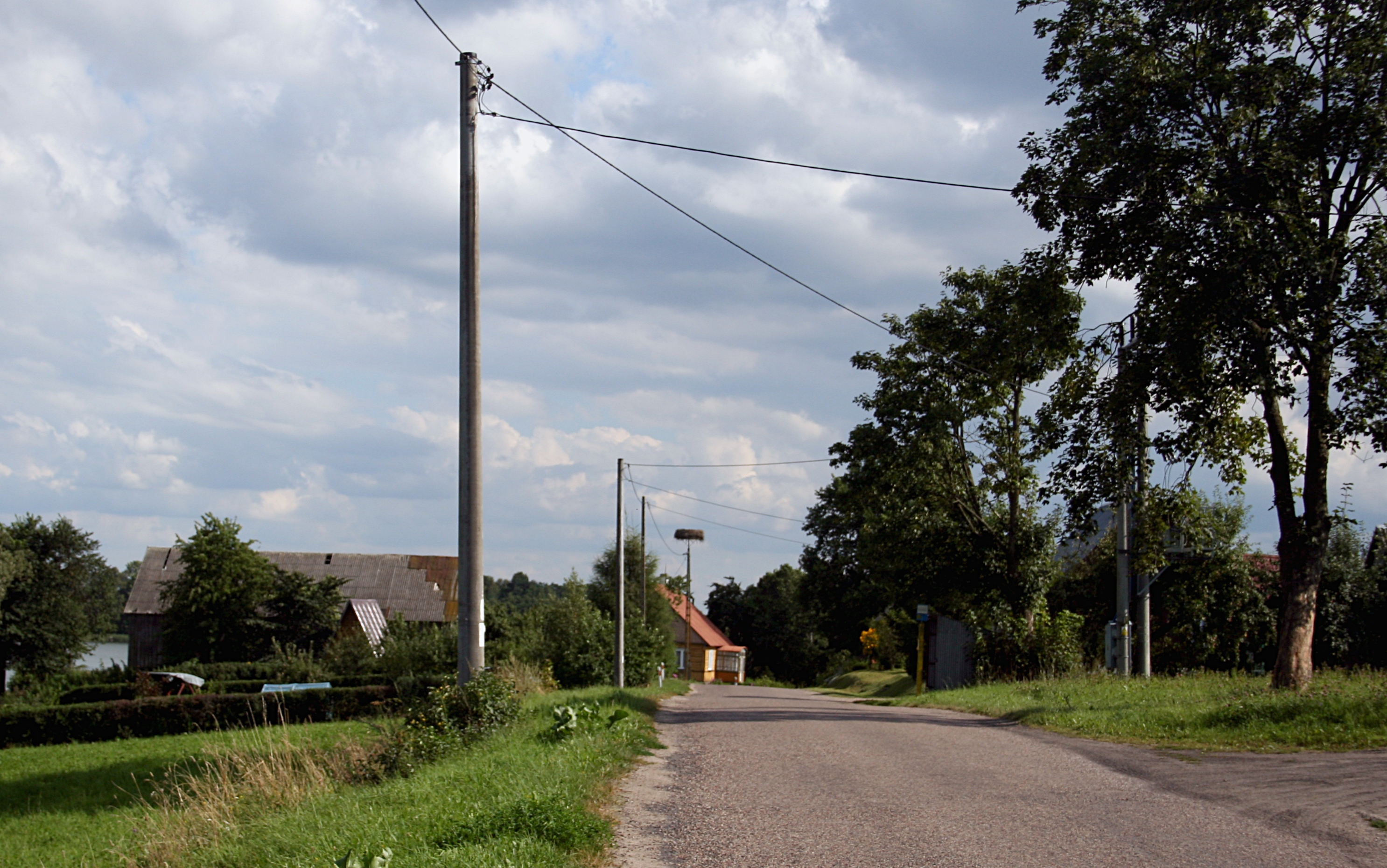

- Location within Poland
- Coordinates: 54°4′N 23°18′E
- Country: Poland
- Voivodeship: Podlaskie
- County: Sejny
- Gmina: Giby
- Population: 103
- Postal code: 16-506
- Car plates: BSE

Białogóry [bjawɔˈɡurɨ], is a village in the administrative district of Gmina Giby, within Sejny County, Podlaskie Voivodeship, in north-eastern Poland, close to the borders with Belarus and Lithuania.

== History ==
In 1827 it was recorded that the population of the village numbered at 176 and 12 homes and in 1880 it was numbered at 211 people and 30 homes.

In 1921, the village had 25 houses and 133 inhabitants, including 81 Old Believers and 52 Catholics

== Tourist attractions ==
A historic Old Believers' cemetery has been preserved in the village. The first documents proving its existence date back to 1863, while the last burial took place there in 1946. In August 2020, there was serious devastation of the cemetery and desecration of the graves of those buried there
