= Aleksiejówka =

- Village
- Location within Poland
- Coordinates: 54°2′47.72″N 23°22′16.25″E
- Country: Poland
- Voivodeship: Podlaskie
- County: Sejny
- Gmina: Giby

Population
  - Total: 25
- Time zone: UTC+1 (CET)
  - Summer (DST): UTC+2 (CEST)
- Postal code: 16-506
- Vehicle registration: BSE

Aleksiejówka ([alɛkɕɛˈjufka]) is a village in the administrative district of Gmina Giby, within Sejny County, Podlaskie Voivodeship, in north-eastern Poland, close to the borders with Belarus and Lithuania.

== History ==
From the 13th century to 1795, the village was administratively located in the Trakai Voivodeship of the Grand Duchy of Lithuania and Polish–Lithuanian Commonwealth.

In 1880 it was numbered at 13 people and 2 homes.

In the interwar period, a lime kiln operated here by Świsłowski and Koncewicz. According to the 1921 census, the village had a population of 46, entirely Polish by nationality and Catholic by confession.
