= Białowierśnie =

- Village
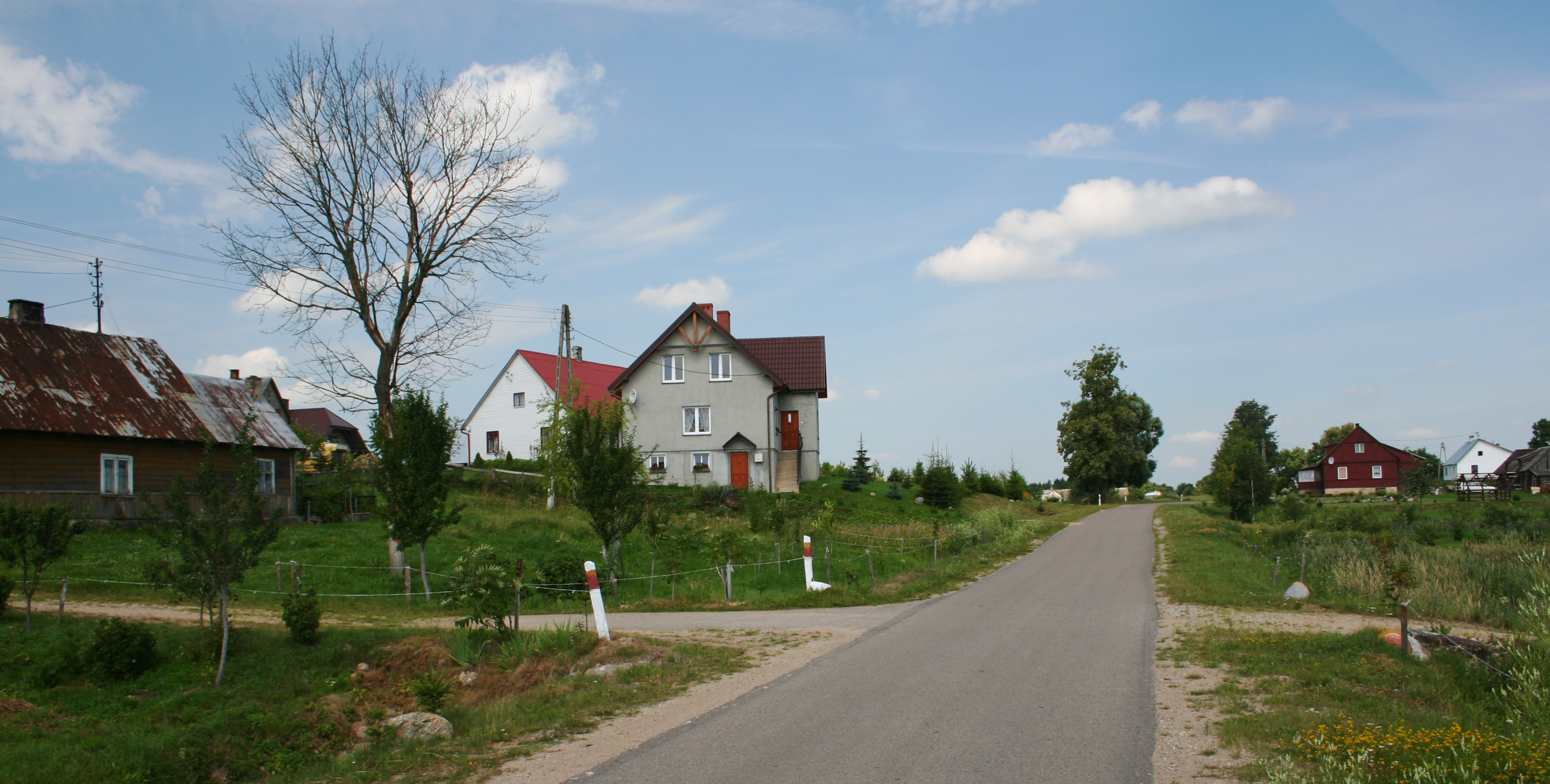

- Location within Poland
- Coordinates: 54°4′N 23°19′E
- Country: Poland
- Voivodeship: Podlaskie
- County: Sejny
- Gmina: Giby
- Population: 70
- Postal code: 16-506
- Car plates: BSE

Białowierśnie [bjawɔˈvjɛrɕɲɛ], is a village in the administrative district of Gmina Giby, within Sejny County, Podlaskie Voivodeship, in north-eastern Poland, close to the borders with Belarus and Lithuania.

== History ==
In the 18th century the village, which had 6 fibres, belonged to the Camaldolese estate in Wigry. In 17th and 18th century it was inhabited by several to a dozen farmers.

In 1827 it was recorded that the population of the village numbered at 111 and 11 homes.
