= System identyfikatorów i nazw miejscowości =

Polish government ID scheme for places

System identyfikatorów i nazw miejscowości (transl. System for IDs and names of places), abbreviated as SIMC, is a Polish government scheme to create unique identifiers for places. It is part of the Krajowy Rejestr Urzędowego Podziału Terytorialnego Kraju (TERYT; transl. National Register of Territorial Divisions of the Country). The system is managed by Statistics Poland.

SIMC is a registry of names of places and their constituent parts, including the following information:

- The official name of the village
- ID of the village
- the type of locality
- parent village commune, district and province
- SIMC ID with check digit

SIMC IDs and place names are updated on a regular basis after changes of official names of places and changes in the basic territorial divisions of the state. SIMC IDs are unique and permanent.
