= Łopuchowo =

Łopuchowo may refer to the following places in Poland:

- Łopuchowo, Greater Poland Voivodeship (west-central Poland)
- Łopuchowo, Białystok County in Podlaskie Voivodeship (north-east Poland)
- Łopuchowo, Sejny County in Podlaskie Voivodeship (north-east Poland)
- Łopuchowo, Suwałki County in Podlaskie Voivodeship (north-east Poland)
