= Morris Rosenfeld =

American poet

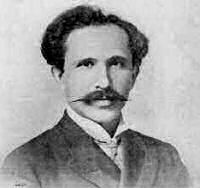
- Morris Rosenfeld in Stare Boksze, Russian Poland
- Born: Moshe Yankev; December 28, 1862; Stare Boksze, Poland, Russian Empire
- Died: June 22, 1923 (aged 60); New York City, United States
- Occupations: publisher, editor, poet
- Writing career
- Language: Yiddish

Morris Rosenfeld (Yiddish: מאָריס ראָסענפֿעלד; born as Moshe Yankev Chmielowski; December 28, 1862 in Stare Boksze in Russian Poland, government of Suwałki – June 22, 1923 in New York City) was a Yiddish poet.

His work sheds light on the living circumstances of emigrants from Eastern Europe in New York's tailoring workshops, and he is considered one of a number of Yiddish "sweat shop poets". (Note: Lewis, J. (1988). "ETERNITY, DEATH AND GRAMMAR:" THE IN ZIKH POETS-AMERICAN YIDDISH MODERNISM*. Sulfur, (23), 173-180. Retrieved from https://www.proquest.com/scholarly-journals/eternity-death-grammar-zikh-poets-american/docview/871716188/se-2 - Quotation: The first school of modern Yiddish poets to arise were "the sweat-shop poets." Poets such as Morris Rosenfeld and Dovid Edelshtat spoke to the difficult experiences of the many Jews who emigrated to America. True proletarian poets who labored in factories, these writers were published in the Yiddish labor papers, recited their verse at union rallies and were regarded as heroes by an immigrant community suffering under the weight of rapid cultural disintegration and enforced proletarianization.)

His parents gave him a third name “Alter” (Moshe Yankev Alter) after the cholera epidemic around 1870, during which all of his siblings died (he later had one younger brother). Upon his emmigration to the United States, he changed his family name to Rosenfeld. Morris was educated at Boksha, Suwałki, and Warsaw. He worked as a tailor in New York and London and as a diamond cutter in Amsterdam, and settled in New York in 1886, after which he was connected with the editorial staffs of several leading Jewish newspapers. During the 1890s he wrote song parodies for the Yehuda Katzenelenbogen Music Publishing Company in New York, including Nokhn ball (After the Ball), Di pawnshop (Faryomert farklogt) and Nem tsurik dayn gold (Take Back Your Gold) - all published in Di idishe bihne and Lider magazin. In 1904 he published a weekly entitled Der Ashmedai. In 1905 he was editor of the New Yorker Morgenblatt. He was also the publisher and editor of a quarterly journal of literature (printed in Yiddish) entitled Jewish Annals. He was a delegate to the Fourth Zionist Congress at London in 1900, and gave readings at Harvard University in 1898, the University of Chicago in 1900, and Wellesley and Radcliffe colleges in 1902.

Rosenfeld was the author of Di Gloke [The bell] (New York, 1888), poems of a revolutionary character; later the author bought and destroyed all obtainable copies of this book. He wrote also Di Blumenkette [The chain of flowers] (New York, 1890) and Dos Lieder-Bukh (New York, 1897; English transl. by Leo Wiener, Songs from the Ghetto, Boston, 1899; German transl. by Berthold Feivel, Berlin, and by E. A. Fishin, Milwaukee, Wis., 1899; Rumanian transl. by M. Iaşi, 1899; Polish transl. by J. Feldman, Vienna, 1903; Hungarian transl. by A. Kiss, Budapest; Bohemian transl. by J. Vrchlický, Prague; Croatian transl. by Aleksandar Licht, Zagreb, 1906). His collected poems were published under the title Gezamelte Lieder, in New York, in 1904.

== Works ==
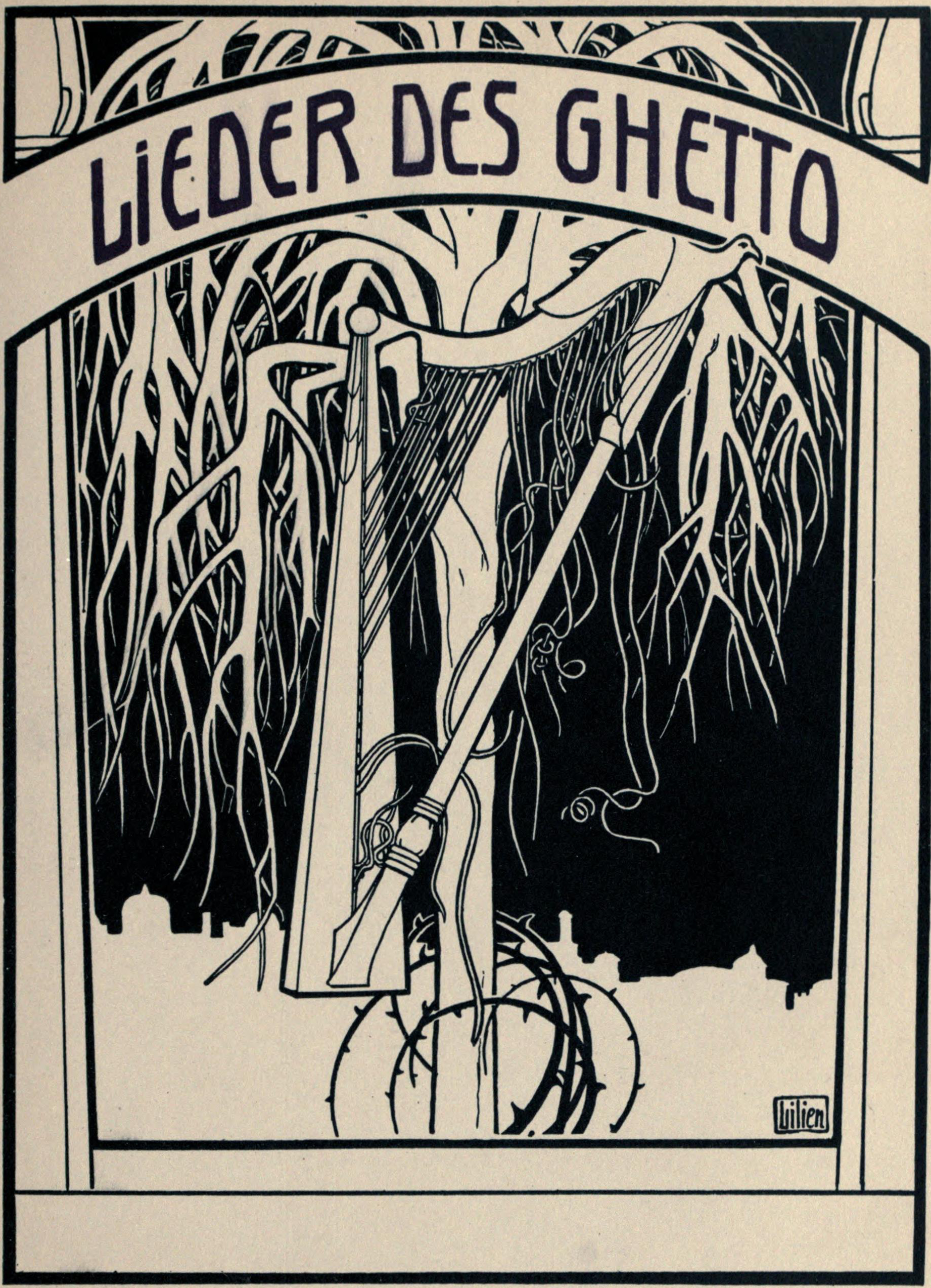
Illustration by Lilien of the book (1903): Lieder des Ghetto of Morris Rosenfeld; translation from Yiddish to German by Berthold Feiwel

- "Di gloke" (The Bell), Poetry collection, 1888
- "Di blumenkette" (The Chain of Flowers), Poetry collection, 1890
- "Lider-bukh", Poetry collection
  - First English edition: Songs from the Ghetto. Translated by Leo Wiener. New York, 1898
  - First German edition: Lieder des Ghetto (songs from the ghetto). Translated by Berthold Feiwel. Calvary, Berlin, 1902
- "Shriftn", selected works in six volumes, New York, 1908–1910
- "Geveylte shriftn", New York, 1912
- "Dos bukh fun libe", 1914
- Songs of Labor and Other Poems. Translated by Rose Pastor Stokes and Helena Frank. Boston: Richard G. Badger, 1914.
