= Buchta =

Buchta (feminine: Buchtová) is a Czech surname. The Czech word buchta has two meanings: it refers to the sweet pastry Buchteln, and it also means 'unfired brick'. The surname probably originated as a designation of the occupation of someone who works with buchtas, but it could also have originated as a nickname for a person with limited mobility. Notable people with the surname include:

- David Buchta (born 1999), Czech footballer
- Karel Buchta (1897–1959), Czech soldier and skier
- Luboš Buchta (born 1967), Czech cross-country skier
- Miloš Buchta (born 1980), Czech footballer
- Petr Buchta (born 1992), Czech footballer
- Richard Buchta (1845–1894), Austrian explorer

== See also ==
- Czarna Buchta, a village in Poland
