= Ryżówka =

Village in Gmina Krasnopol, Poland

- Village
- Location within Poland
- Coordinates: 54°4′57″N 23°7′12″E
- Country: Poland
- Voivodeship: Podlaskie
- County: Sejny
- Gmina: Krasnopol
- Population: 60
- Postal code: 16-412
- Car plates: BSE

Ryżówka [rɨˈʐufka], is a village in the administrative district of Gmina Krasnopol, within Sejny County, Podlaskie Voivodeship, in north-eastern Poland. The village lies on provincial road 653, on Lake Dowcień.

The faithful of the Roman Catholic Church belong to the parish of the Immaculate Conception of the Blessed Virgin Mary in Wigry.

== Geography ==
The village is situated on the border of the Suwalki Landscape Park. The village buildings adjoin Lake Dowcień, a body of water surrounded by fields and oak-hornbeam forests.

== History ==
In 1827 it was recorded that the population of the village numbered at 13 and 2 homes and in 1889 it was numbered at 63 people and 4 homes

On 23 February 1944, near the village there was fighting between Polish partisans and German soldiers. During World War II, some of the buildings in the village were burnt down.
