= Wysoka Góra, Podlaskie Voivodeship =

Wysoka Góra
- Village
- Location within Poland
- Coordinates: 54°8′N 23°7′E
- Country: Poland
- Voivodeship: Podlaskie
- County: Sejny
- Gmina: Krasnopol
- Population: 29
- Postal code: 16-503
- Car plates: BSE

Wysoka Góra [vɨˈsɔka ˈɡura], was a village in the administrative district of Gmina Krasnopol, within Sejny County, Podlaskie Voivodeship, in north-eastern Poland. The location lies approximately 7 km (4 mi) west of Krasnopol, 17 km (11 mi) west of Sejny, and 113 km (70 mi) north of the regional capital Białystok.
