= Nowe Boksze =

- Village
- Location within Poland
- Coordinates: 54°10′50″N 23°9′36″E
- Country: Poland
- Voivodeship: Podlaskie
- County: Sejny
- Gmina: Krasnopol
- Population: 44
- Postal code: 16-515
- Car plates: BSE

Nowe Boksze [ˈnɔvɛ ˈbɔkʂɛ], is a village in the administrative district of Gmina Krasnopol, within Sejny County, Podlaskie Voivodeship, in north-eastern Poland.

== History ==
In 1880 it was documented that Nowe Boksze had a population of 162 people and 14 homes

== See also ==
- Stare Boksze
