= Zlobin =

Zlobin, Żłobin or Zhlobin may refer to

- Zlobin, Croatia, a village in western Croatia
- Żłobin, Podlaskie Voivodeship, a village in north-eastern Poland
- Zhlobin, a city in Belarus
  - Zhlobin District
  - FC Zhlobin, an association football club based in Zhlobin
  - Metallurg Zhlobin, an ice hockey club based in Zhlobin
- Zlobin (surname)
