= Skustele =

- Village
- Location within Poland
- Coordinates: 54°7′N 23°18′E
- Country: Poland
- Voivodeship: Podlaskie
- County: Sejny
- Gmina: Krasnopol
- Population: 28
- Postal code: 16-503
- Car plates: BSE

Skustele [skusˈtɛlɛ], is a village in the administrative district of Gmina Krasnopol, within Sejny County, Podlaskie Voivodeship, in north-eastern Poland.

== History ==
In 1827 it was recorded that the population of the village numbered at 60 and 5 homes and in 1889 it was numbered at 73 people and 6 homes
