= Czerwony Krzyż, Podlaskie Voivodeship =

Czerwony Krzyż
- Village
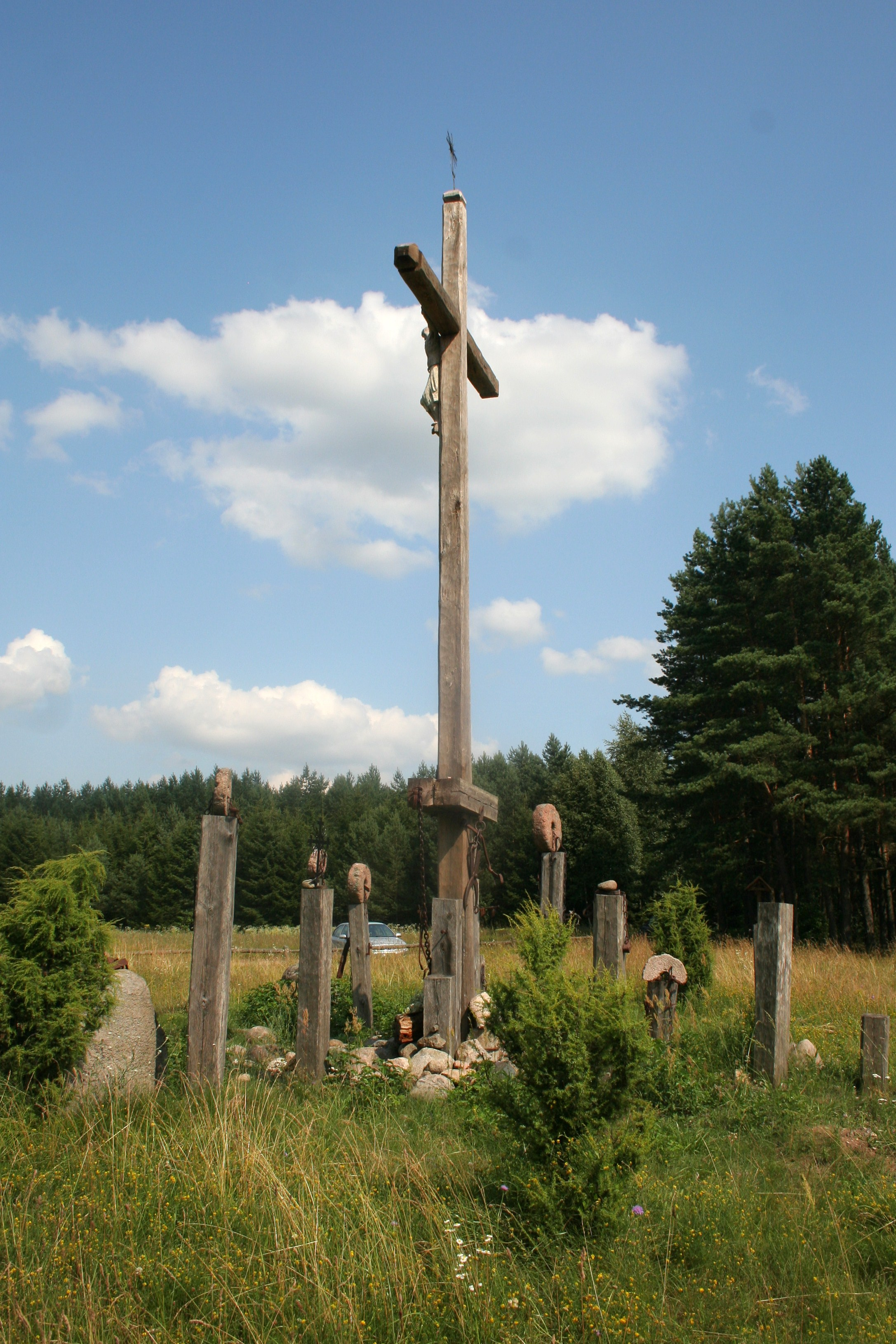

- Location within Poland
- Coordinates: 54°0′48″N 23°8′28″E
- Country: Poland
- Voivodeship: Podlaskie
- County: Sejny
- Gmina: Krasnopol

Population
  - Total: 12
- Postal code: 16-503
- Car plates: BSE

Czerwony Krzyż [t͡ʂɛrˈvɔnɨ ˈkʂɨʂ], is a village in the administrative district of Gmina Krasnopol, within Sejny County, Podlaskie Voivodeship, in north-eastern Poland.

== History ==
The clergy village was located at the end of the 18th century in the Grodno district of the Trakai Voivodeship of the Grand Duchy of Lithuania.

In 1827 it was recorded that the population of the village numbered at 93 and 13 homes and in 1880 it was numbered at 182 people and 27 homes.

=== World War II ===
On 23 June 1944 at 4 a.m. the German military police entered the village and "pacified" it. The inhabitants were ordered to leave their homes, after which 53 people were loaded onto trucks and taken to concentration camps. The village was almost completely burnt down. Out of 43 households only five were left. In the village there is a stone with an engraved inscription commemorating the event.
