= Pawłówka, Podlaskie Voivodeship =

Pawłówka
- Village
- Location within Poland
- Coordinates: 54°7′N 23°15′E
- Country: Poland
- Voivodeship: Podlaskie
- County: Sejny
- Gmina: Krasnopol
- Population: 87
- Postal code: 16-503
- Car plates: BSE

Pawłówka [paˈvwufka], is a village in the administrative district of Gmina Krasnopol, within Sejny County, Podlaskie Voivodeship, in north-eastern Poland. The village lies near provincial road no. 653.

The village is also situated on the Pawlowka River.

== Tourist attractions ==
The following objects are included in the register of monuments of the National Heritage Institute:

- World War I cemetery (Reg. No. 332 of 10.03.1983)

=== Also ===
- A Basilica-type church from 1923.
- The largest erratic boulder in the Suwałki region with a circumference of 15 m.
