= Michnowce =

- Village
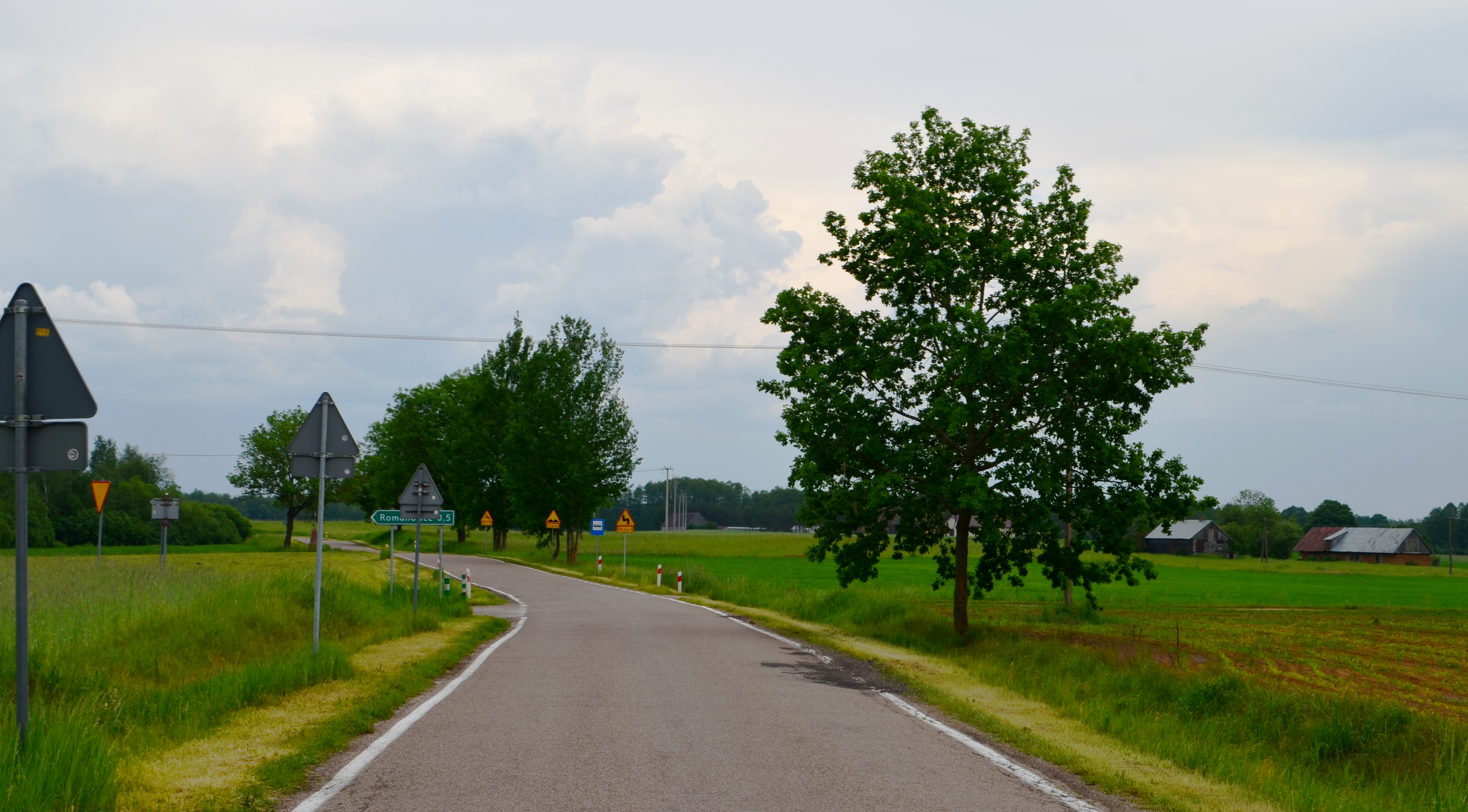

- Location within Poland
- Coordinates: 54°7′N 23°17′E
- Country: Poland
- Voivodeship: Podlaskie
- County: Sejny
- Gmina: Krasnopol
- Population: 23
- Postal code: 16-503
- Car plates: BSE

Michnowce [mixˈnɔft͡sɛ], is a village in the administrative district of Gmina Krasnopol, within Sejny County, Podlaskie Voivodeship, in north-eastern Poland.

== History ==
In 1827 it was recorded that the population of the village numbered at 89 and 8 homes and in 1885 it was numbered at 143 people and 11 homes.
