= Królówek =

Village in Gmina Krasnopol, Poland

- Village
- Location within Poland
- Coordinates: 54°7′10″N 23°5′35″E
- Country: Poland
- Voivodeship: Podlaskie
- County: Sejny
- Gmina: Krasnopol
- Population: 10
- Postal code: 16-515
- Car plates: BSE

Królówek [kruˈluvɛk], is a village in the administrative district of Gmina Krasnopol, within Sejny County, Podlaskie Voivodeship, in north-eastern Poland.

The faithful of the Roman Catholic Church belong to the parish of the Immaculate Conception of the Blessed Virgin Mary in Wigry.
