= Sidory Zapolne =

- Village
- Location within Poland
- Coordinates: 54°15′37″N 22°56′51″E
- Country: Poland
- Voivodeship: Podlaskie
- County: Suwałki
- Gmina: Jeleniewo

Sidory Zapolne [ɕiˈdɔrɨ zaˈpɔlnɛ] is a village in the administrative district of Gmina Jeleniewo, within Suwałki County, Podlaskie Voivodeship, in northeastern Poland.
