= Stara Żubrówka =

- Village
- Location within Poland
- Coordinates: 54°5′N 23°9′E
- Country: Poland
- Voivodeship: Podlaskie
- County: Sejny
- Gmina: Krasnopol
- Population: 49
- Postal code: 16-503
- Car plates: BSE

Stara Żubrówka [ˈstara ʐuˈbrufka], is a village in the administrative district of Gmina Krasnopol, within Sejny County, Podlaskie Voivodeship, in north-eastern Poland.The village also lies near provincial road no. 653.

== History ==
In 1827 it was recorded that the population of the village numbered at 66 and 10 homes and in 1895 it was numbered at 118 people and 15 homes
