= Krasne, Gmina Krasnopol =

Krasne
- Village
- Location within Poland
- Coordinates: 54°1′55″N 23°17′10″E
- Country: Poland
- Voivodeship: Podlaskie
- County: Sejny
- Gmina: Krasnopol
- Population: 98
- Postal code: 16-515
- Car plates: BSE

Krasne [ˈkrasnɛ], is a village in the administrative district of Gmina Krasnopol, within Sejny County, Podlaskie Voivodeship, in north-eastern Poland.

== History ==
The village was established around 1780, in 1883 it was documented that the village had 10 homes and that the population was of the Roman Catholic faith, a private library built by P. Nowalski was also documented.
