= Rudawka, Sejny County =

Rudawka
- Village
- Location within Poland
- Coordinates: 54°11′N 23°12′E
- Country: Poland
- Voivodeship: Podlaskie
- County: Sejny
- Gmina: Krasnopol
- Population: 30
- Postal code: 16-515
- Car plates: BSE

Rudawka [ruˈdafka], is a village in the administrative district of Gmina Krasnopol, within Sejny County, Podlaskie Voivodeship, in north-eastern Poland.

== History ==
In 1827 it was recorded that the population of the village numbered at 68 and 7 homes and in 1888 it was numbered at 89 people and 10 homes
