= Piotrowa Dąbrowa =

- Village
- Location within Poland
- Coordinates: 54°9′N 23°6′E
- Country: Poland
- Voivodeship: Podlaskie
- County: Sejny
- Gmina: Krasnopol
- Population: 64
- Postal code: 16-503
- Car plates: BSE

Piotrowa Dąbrowa [pjɔˈtrɔva dɔmˈbrɔva], is a village in the administrative district of Gmina Krasnopol, within Sejny County, Podlaskie Voivodeship, in north-eastern Poland.

== History ==
In 1827 the village population numbered 126 people with 10 houses and in 1887 the population was numbered at 13 people with 2 homes
