= Gmina Jeleniewo =

Gmina Jeleniewo Jeleniewo Commune
- Gmina
- Coat of arms

- Gmina Jeleniewo within the Suwałki County
- Coordinates (Jeleniewo): 54°12′21″N 22°54′46″E
- Country: Poland
- Voivodeship: Podlaskie
- County: Suwałki County
- Seat: Jeleniewo

Area
  - Total: 131.84 km^{2} (50.90 sq mi)

Population (2006)
  - Total: 3,018
  - Density: 22.89/km^{2} (59.29/sq mi)
- Website: http://www.niemen.org.pl/gminy/jeleniewo/index.htm

Gmina Jeleniewo, is a rural gmina (administrative district) in Suwałki County, Podlaskie Voivodeship, in north-eastern Poland. Its seat is the village of Jeleniewo, which lies approximately 14 kilometres (9 mi) north of Suwałki and 122 km (76 mi) north of the regional capital Białystok.

It covers an area of 131.84 square kilometres (50.9 sq mi), and as of 2006 its total population is 3,018.

It contains part of the protected area called Suwałki Landscape Park.

== Villages ==
Gmina Jeleniewo consists of the villages and settlements of Bachanowo, Białorogi, Błaskowizna, Czajewszczyzna, Czerwone Bagno, Gulbieniszki, Hultajewo, Ignatówka, Jeleniewo, Kazimierówka, Krzemianka, Leszczewo, Łopuchowo, Malesowizna, Okrągłe, Podwysokie Jeleniewskie, Prudziszki, Rutka, Rychtyn, Ścibowo, Sidorówka, Sidory, Sidory Zapolne, Suchodoły, Sumowo, Szeszupka, Szurpiły, Udryn, Udziejek, Wodziłki, Wołownia, Zarzecze Jeleniewskie and Żywa Woda.

== Neighbouring gminas ==
Gmina Jeleniewo is bordered by the city of Suwałki and by the gminas of Przerośl, Rutka-Tartak, Suwałki, Szypliszki and Wiżajny.
