= Nowa Żubrówka =

- Village
- Location within Poland
- Coordinates: 54°6′N 23°9′E
- Country: Poland
- Voivodeship: Podlaskie
- County: Sejny
- Gmina: Krasnopol
- Elevation: 102 m (335 ft)
- Population: 29
- Postal code: 16-503
- Car plates: BSE

Nowa Żubrówka [ˈnɔva ʐuˈbrufka], is a village in the administrative district of Gmina Krasnopol, within Sejny County, Podlaskie Voivodeship, in north-eastern Poland.

The faithful of the Roman Catholic Church belong to the parish of the Immaculate Conception of the Blessed Virgin Mary in Wigry.

== History ==
It was documented in 1827 the population of the village was 31 people with 5 homes and in 1895 it was documented that the population was 69 people with 10 homes.

== Tourist attractions ==
In the village there is a listed farmhouse with buildings dating from the 19th century and the 1920s, listed on the National Heritage Institute's Register of Historic Buildings:

- agro-enclosure no. 2 (Reg. No.: 24 of 13.04.1979):
- house, wooden, mid-19th c.
- wooden pigpen, 1879
- wooden barn, 1871
- wooden granary, 1920
- cellar, 2nd half of the 19th c.
- clay and wood coop, 1920
