= Maćkowa Ruda, Gmina Krasnopol =

Maćkowa Ruda
- Village
- Location within Poland
- Coordinates: 54°3′N 23°10′E
- Country: Poland
- Voivodeship: Podlaskie
- County: Sejny
- Gmina: Krasnopol
- Population: 217
- Postal code: 16-503
- Car plates: BSE

Maćkowa Ruda [mat͡ɕˈkɔva ˈruda], is a village in the administrative district of Gmina Krasnopol, within Sejny County, Podlaskie Voivodeship, in north-eastern Poland.

The faithful of the Roman Catholic Church belong to the parish of the Immaculate Conception of the Blessed Virgin Mary in Wigry

== History ==
In 1827 it was recorded that the population of the village numbered at 187 and 31 homes and in 1884 it was numbered at 397 people and 44 homes.
