= Sidory, Gmina Jeleniewo =

Sidory
- Village
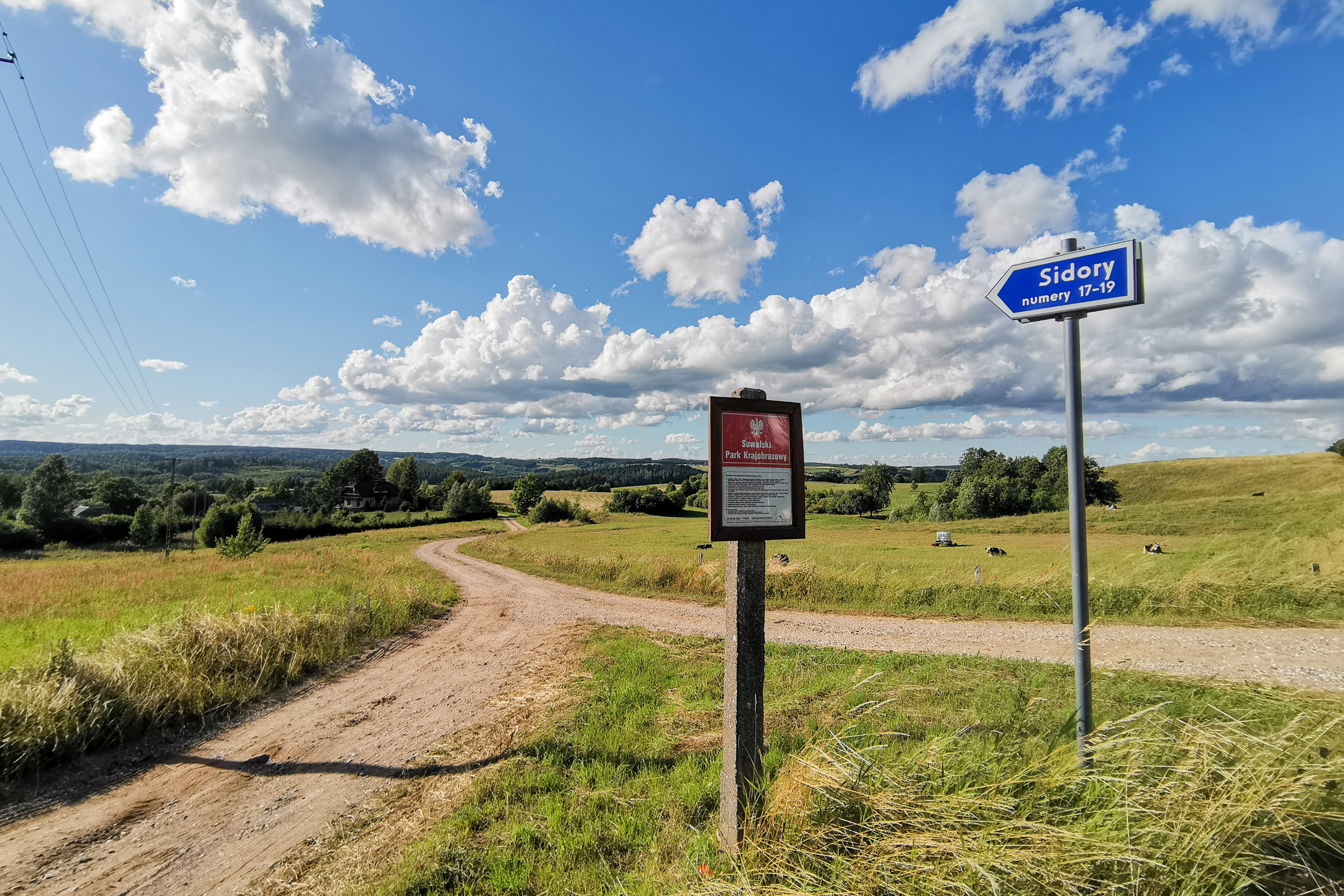

- Location within Poland
- Coordinates: 54°16′10″N 22°55′30″E
- Country: Poland
- Voivodeship: Podlaskie
- County: Suwałki
- Gmina: Jeleniewo

Sidory [ɕiˈdɔrɨ] is a village in the administrative district of Gmina Jeleniewo, within Suwałki County, Podlaskie Voivodeship, in north-eastern Poland.
