= Żubronajcie =

- Village
- Location within Poland
- Coordinates: 54°07′18″N 23°07′32″E
- Country: Poland
- Voivodeship: Podlaskie
- County: Sejny
- Gmina: Krasnopol
- Population: 25
- Postal code: 16-412
- Car plates: BSE

Żubronajcie [ʐubrɔˈnai̯t͡ɕɛ], is a village in the administrative district of Gmina Krasnopol, within Sejny County, Podlaskie Voivodeship, in north-eastern Poland.

== History ==
In 1827 it was recorded that the population of the village numbered at 103 and 10 homes and in 1895 it was numbered at 119 people and 16 homes.
