= Gmina Krasnopol =

Gmina Krasnopol Krasnopol Commune
- Gmina
- Flag Coat of arms

- Gmina Krasnopol within the Sejny County
- Coordinates (Krasnopol): 54°6′57″N 23°12′25″E
- Country: Poland
- Voivodeship: Podlaskie
- County: Sejny
- Seat: Krasnopol

Area
  - Total: 171.63 km^{2} (66.27 sq mi)

Population (2006)
  - Total: 3,902
  - Density: 22.73/km^{2} (58.88/sq mi)

Gmina Krasnopol, is a rural gmina (administrative district) in Sejny County, Podlaskie Voivodeship, in north-eastern Poland. Its seat is the village of Krasnopol, which lies approximately 11 kilometres (7 mi) west of Sejny and 111 km (69 mi) north of the regional capital Białystok.

The gmina covers an area of 171.63 square kilometres (66.3 sq mi), and as of 2006 its total population is 3,902.

== Villages ==
Gmina Krasnopol contains the villages and settlements of Aleksandrowo, Buda Ruska, Czarna Buchta, Czerwony Krzyż, Głuszyn, Gremzdel, Gremzdy Polskie, Jegliniec, Jeglówek, Jeziorki, Krasne, Krasnopol, Królówek, Krucieniszki, Linówek, Łopuchowo, Maćkowa Ruda, Michnowce, Mikołajewo, Murowany Most, Nowa Żubrówka, Nowe Boksze, Orlinek, Pawłówka, Piotrowa Dąbrowa, Rudawka, Ryżówka, Skustele, Smolany Dąb, Stabieńszczyzna, Stara Żubrówka, Teklinowo, Wysoka Góra, Żłobin and Żubronajcie.

== Neighbouring gminas ==
Gmina Krasnopol is bordered by the gminas of Giby, Nowinka, Puńsk, Sejny, Suwałki and Szypliszki.
