= Krucieniszki =

- Village
- Location within Poland
- Coordinates: 54°10′N 23°11′E
- Country: Poland
- Voivodeship: Podlaskie
- County: Sejny
- Gmina: Krasnopol
- Population: 29
- Postal code: 16-515
- Car plates: BSE
- Website: http://krucieniszki.ulotka.biz

Krucieniszki ([krut͡ɕɛˈniʂki]; Lithuanian: Krucieniškiai) is a village in the administrative district of Gmina Krasnopol, within Sejny County, Podlaskie Voivodeship, in north-eastern Poland.

== History ==
In 1883 it was documented that the village population was numbered at 104 people with 14 homes.
