= Żywa Woda, Podlaskie Voivodeship =

Żywa Woda
- Village
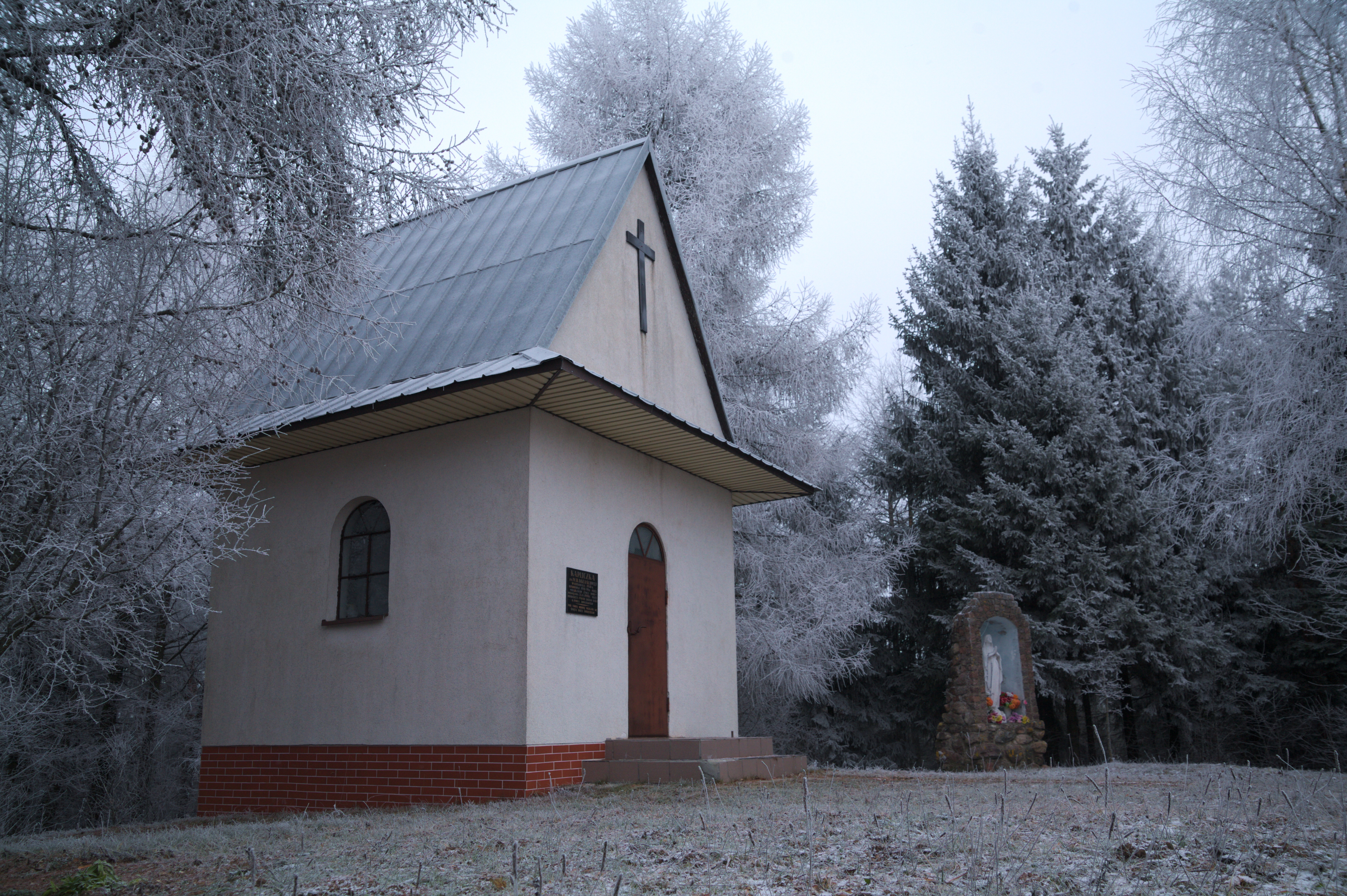

- Location within Poland
- Coordinates: 54°11′N 22°52′E
- Country: Poland
- Voivodeship: Podlaskie
- County: Suwałki
- Gmina: Jeleniewo
- Website: http://www.zywa-woda.ovh.org/index.html

Żywa Woda [ˈʐɨva ˈvɔda] is a village in the administrative district of Gmina Jeleniewo, within Suwałki County, Podlaskie Voivodeship, in north-eastern Poland.
