= Buda Ruska =

- Village
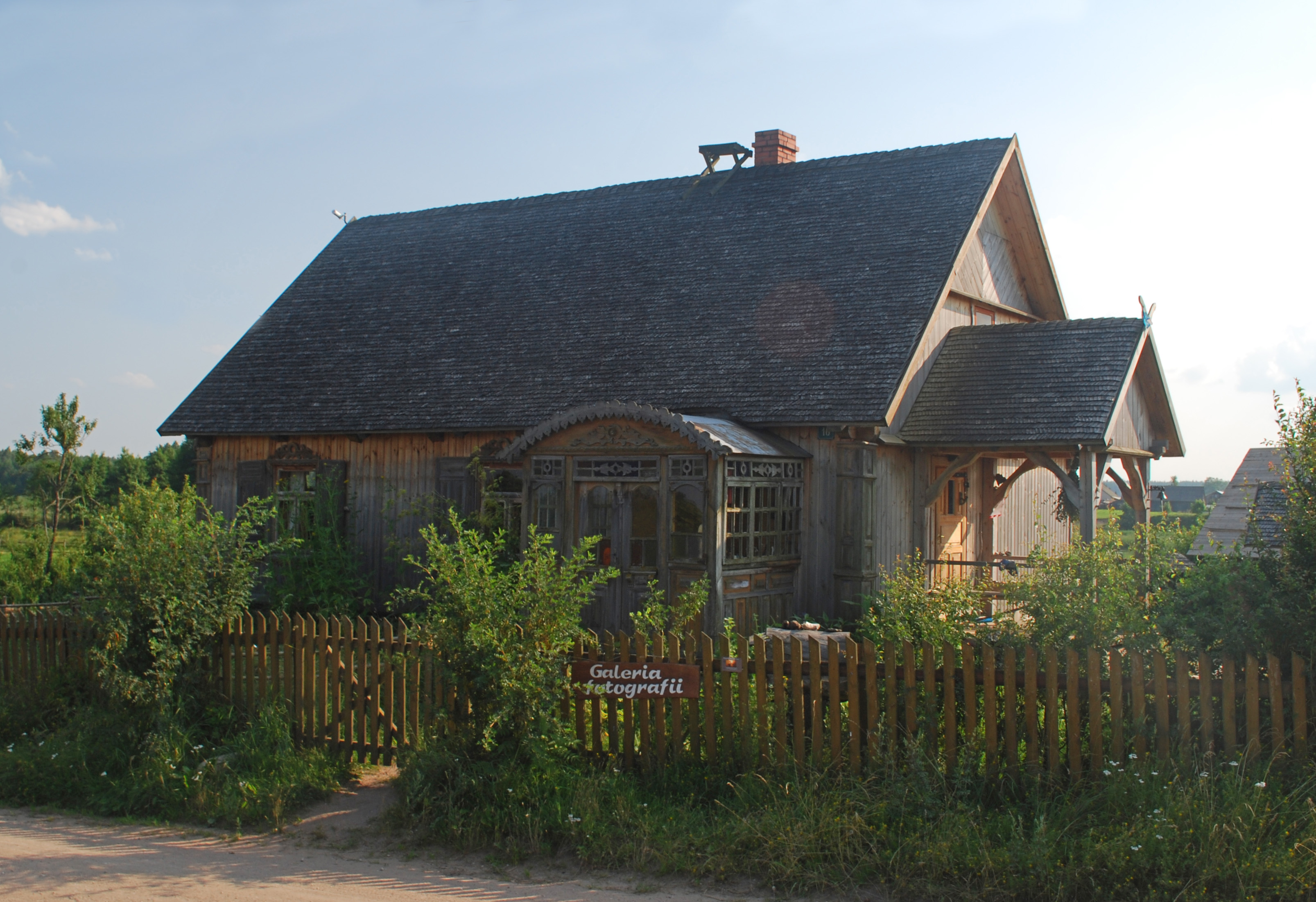
- Wooden house

- Location within Poland
- Coordinates: 54°3′N 23°12′E
- Country: Poland
- Voivodeship: Podlaskie
- County: Sejny
- Gmina: Krasnopol
- Population: 96
- Postal code: 16-503
- Car plates: BSE

Buda Ruska [ˈbuda ˈruska], is a village in the administrative district of Gmina Krasnopol, within Sejny County, Podlaskie Voivodeship, in north-eastern Poland.

Nowadays, the Old Believer community of Buda Ruska belongs to the parish functioning at the Suwałki Molennia.

== History ==
Until the outbreak of World War II, the village was entirely inhabited by Russian Old Believers., who founded the village in the 18th century while fleeing religious persecution in the Russian Empire.

According to the First General Population Census, conducted in 1921, the village of Buda Ruska had 46 houses with 263 inhabitants. The vast majority of Buda Ruska's 242 inhabitants declared the Old Believers' religion. The others reported, in turn, 20 people declared themselves of the Evangelical confession and one person declared themselves as Roman Catholic. In terms of nationality, Russians dominated, as Russian nationality was declared by 228 villagers, while the remaining 35 people declared Polish nationality

From the end of World War II until 1975, the village was part of the Białystok Voivodeship.

== Tourist attractions ==
- The village is home to the summer house of former Polish President Bronislaw Komorowski and his wife Anna
- There are two necropolises in the village: the Evangelical cemetery and the Old Believers' cemetery.
- There is a photography gallery in the village called Chlewogaleria run by photographer and traveller Piotr Malczewski. The gallery is located in a former pigsty, on farm number 16.
