= Gremzdel =

- Village
- Location within Poland
- Coordinates: 54°9′N 23°11′E
- Country: Poland
- Voivodeship: Podlaskie
- County: Sejny
- Gmina: Krasnopol
- Population: 14
- Postal code: 16-503
- Car plates: BSE

Gremzdel [ˈɡrɛmzdɛl], is a village in the administrative district of Gmina Krasnopol, within Sejny County, Podlaskie Voivodeship, in north-eastern Poland.

In the southern direction of the village is a lake with the same name.

== History ==
In 1881 it was numbered at 59 people and 6 homes.
