= Linówek, Podlaskie Voivodeship =

Linówek
- Village
- Location within Poland
- Coordinates: 54°10′N 23°8′E
- Country: Poland
- Voivodeship: Podlaskie
- County: Sejny
- Gmina: Krasnopol
- Population: 89
- Postal code: 16-515
- Car plates: BSE

Linówek [liˈnuvɛk], is a village in the administrative district of Gmina Krasnopol, within Sejny County, Podlaskie Voivodeship, in north-eastern Poland.
