= Jeziorki, Sejny County =

Jeziorki
- Village
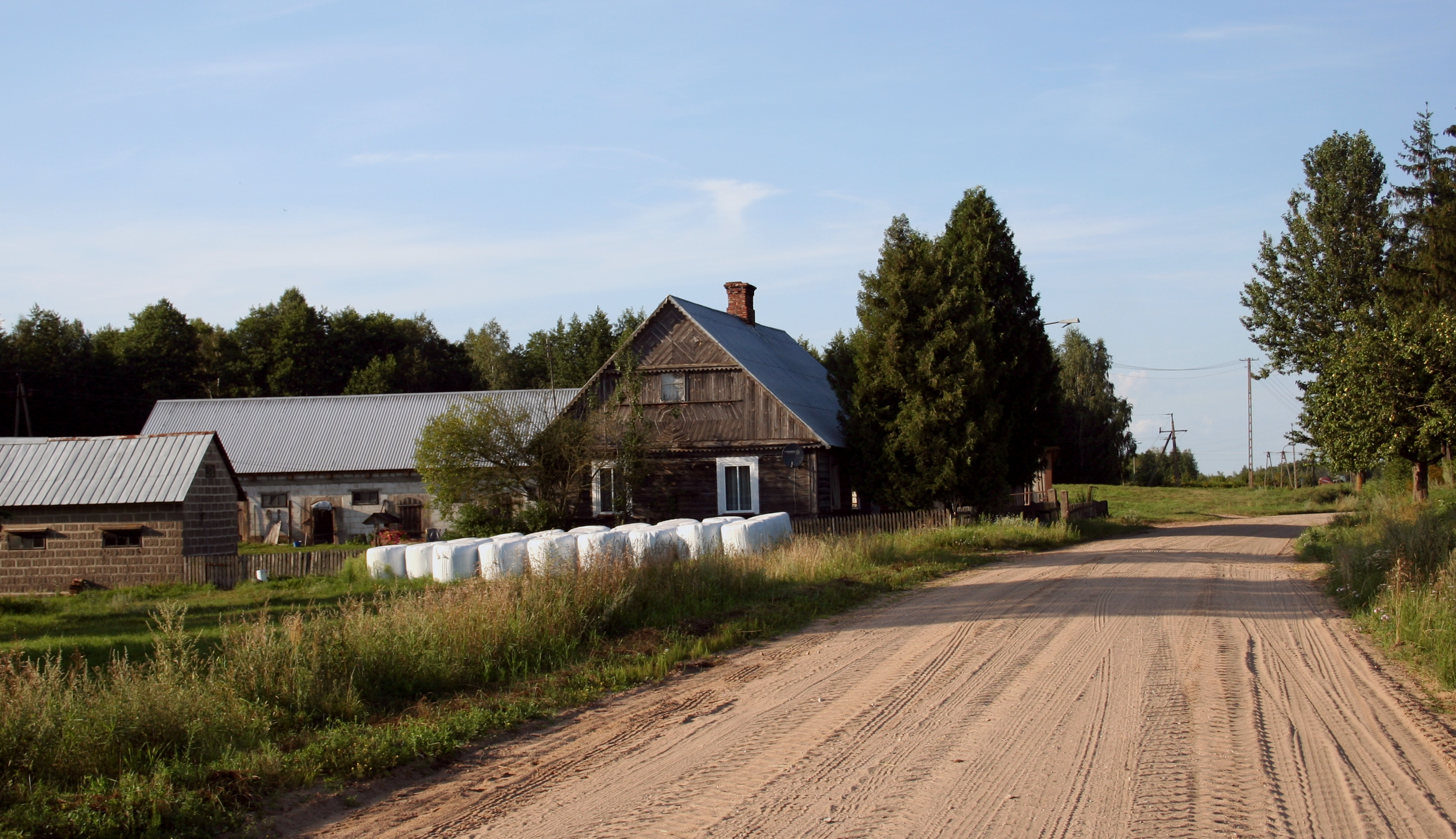

- Location within Poland
- Coordinates: 54°3′10″N 23°14′18″E
- Country: Poland
- Voivodeship: Podlaskie
- County: Sejny
- Gmina: Krasnopol

Population
  - Total: 86
- Postal code: 16-515
- Vehicle registration: BSE

Jeziorki [jɛˈʑɔrki], is a village in the administrative district of Gmina Krasnopol, within Sejny County, Podlaskie Voivodeship, in north-eastern Poland.

== History ==
It was a royal village, administratively located in the Grodno County in the Trakai Voivodeship in the Polish–Lithuanian Commonwealth. In 1882 the village population combined was numbered at 220 people and 29 homes.

Three Polish citizens were murdered by Nazi Germany in the village during World War II.
