= Aleksandrowo, Sejny County =

Aleksandrowo
- Village
- Location within Poland
- Coordinates: 54°5′47″N 23°9′29″E
- Country: Poland
- Voivodeship: Podlaskie
- County: Sejny
- Gmina: Krasnopol
- Population: 93
- Postal code: 16-503
- Car plates: BSE

Aleksandrowo [alɛksanˈdrɔvɔ], is a village in the administrative district of Gmina Krasnopol, within Sejny County, Podlaskie Voivodeship, in north-eastern Poland.

The faithful of the Roman Catholic Church belong to the parish of the Immaculate Conception of the Blessed Virgin Mary in Wigry.

== Transport ==
Provincial road 653 runs through the village.
