= Stabieńszczyzna =

- Village
- Location within Poland
- Coordinates: 54°8′N 23°17′E
- Country: Poland
- Voivodeship: Podlaskie
- County: Sejny
- Gmina: Krasnopol
- Population: 99
- Postal code: 16-503
- Car plates: BSE

Stabieńszczyzna [stabjɛɲʂˈt͡ʂɨzna], is a village in the administrative district of Gmina Krasnopol, within Sejny County, Podlaskie Voivodeship, in north-eastern Poland.

== History ==
In 1827 it was recorded that the population of the village numbered at 151 and 13 homes and in 1890 it was numbered at 73 people and 6 homes.
