= Murowany Most =

- Village
- Location within Poland
- Coordinates: 54°11′N 23°13′E
- Country: Poland
- Voivodeship: Podlaskie
- County: Sejny
- Gmina: Krasnopol
- Population: 39
- Postal code: 16-515
- Car plates: BSE

Murowany Most [murɔˈvanɨ ˈmɔst], is a village in the administrative district of Gmina Krasnopol, within Sejny County, Podlaskie Voivodeship, in north-eastern Poland.

== History ==
It was documented that in 1885 the population of the village was numbered at 17 people and 3 homes.
