= Gulbieniszki =

- Village
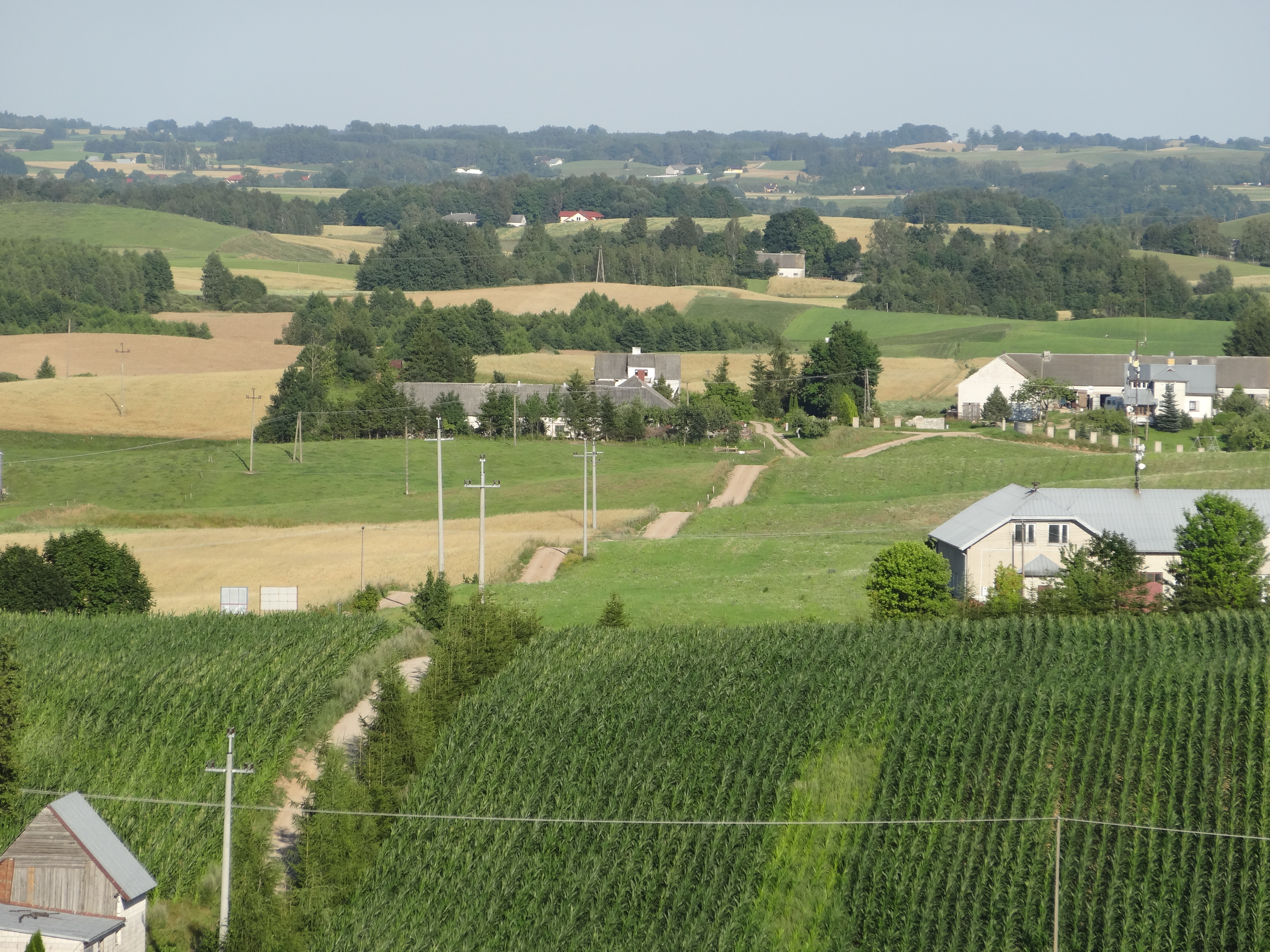

- Location within Poland
- Coordinates: 54°15′N 22°55′E
- Country: Poland
- Voivodeship: Podlaskie
- County: Suwałki
- Gmina: Jeleniewo
- Time zone: UTC+1 (CET)
  - Summer (DST): UTC+2 (CEST)
- Postal code: 16-404
- Area code: (+48) 87
- Vehicle registration: BSU

Gulbieniszki ([ɡulbjɛˈniʂki]) is a village in the administrative district of Gmina Jeleniewo, within Suwałki County, Podlaskie Voivodeship, in north-eastern Poland.

According to the 1921 census, the village had a population of 173, entirely Polish by nationality and Roman Catholic by confession.
