= Głuszyn =

- Village
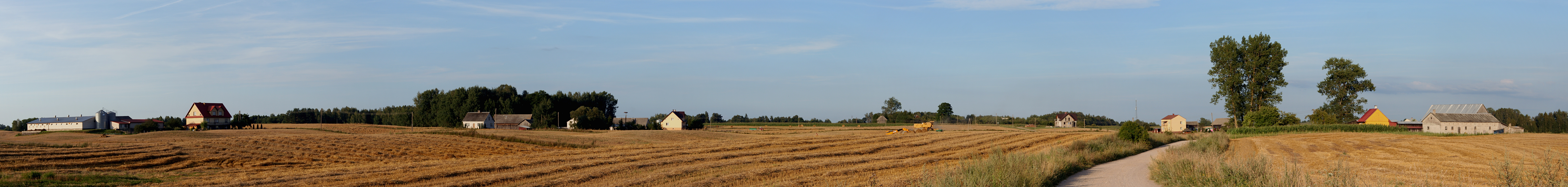

- Location within Poland
- Coordinates: 54°4′42″N 23°14′26″E
- Country: Poland
- Voivodeship: Podlaskie
- County: Sejny
- Gmina: Krasnopol
- Population: 130
- Postal code: 16-503
- Car plates: BSE

Głuszyn [ˈɡwuʂɨn], is a village in the administrative district of Gmina Krasnopol, within Sejny County, Podlaskie Voivodeship, in north-eastern Poland.
