= Ścibowo =

- Village
- Location within Poland
- Coordinates: 54°14′56″N 22°56′29″E
- Country: Poland
- Voivodeship: Podlaskie
- County: Suwałki
- Gmina: Jeleniewo

Ścibowo [ɕt͡ɕiˈbɔvɔ] is a village in the administrative district of Gmina Jeleniewo, within Suwałki County, Podlaskie Voivodeship, in north-eastern Poland.
