= Sumowo, Suwałki County =

Village in Gmina Jeleniewo, Poland

Sumowo
- Village
- Location within Poland
- Coordinates: 54°15′21″N 22°57′43″E
- Country: Poland
- Voivodeship: Podlaskie
- County: Suwałki
- Gmina: Jeleniewo

Sumowo [suˈmɔvɔ] is a village in the administrative district of Gmina Jeleniewo, within Suwałki County, Podlaskie Voivodeship, in north-eastern Poland.
