= Czajewszczyzna =

- Village
- Location within Poland
- Coordinates: 54°14′36″N 22°54′23″E
- Country: Poland
- Voivodeship: Podlaskie
- County: Suwałki
- Gmina: Jeleniewo

Czajewszczyzna [t͡ʂajɛfʂˈt͡ʂɨzna] is a village in the administrative district of Gmina Jeleniewo, within Suwałki County, Podlaskie Voivodeship, in north-eastern Poland.
