= Jeglówek =

Village in Gmina Krasnopol, Poland

- Village
- Location within Poland
- Coordinates: 54°08′58″N 23°07′51″E
- Country: Poland
- Voivodeship: Podlaskie
- County: Sejny
- Gmina: Krasnopol
- Population: 29
- Postal code: 16-503
- Car plates: BSE

Jeglówek [jɛˈɡluvɛk], is a village in the administrative district of Gmina Krasnopol, within Sejny County, Podlaskie Voivodeship, in north-eastern Poland.

== History ==
In 1827 it was recorded that the population of the village numbered at 274 and 30 homes and in 1882 it was numbered at 358 people and 50 homes.
