= Orlinek, Podlaskie Voivodeship =

Orlinek
- Village
- Location within Poland
- Coordinates: 54°10′N 23°8′E
- Country: Poland
- Voivodeship: Podlaskie
- County: Sejny
- Gmina: Krasnopol
- Population: 47
- Postal code: 16-503
- Car plates: BSE

Orlinek [ɔrˈlinɛk], is a village in the administrative district of Gmina Krasnopol, within Sejny County, Podlaskie Voivodeship, in north-eastern Poland.
