= Mikołajewo, Podlaskie Voivodeship =

Mikołajewo
- Village
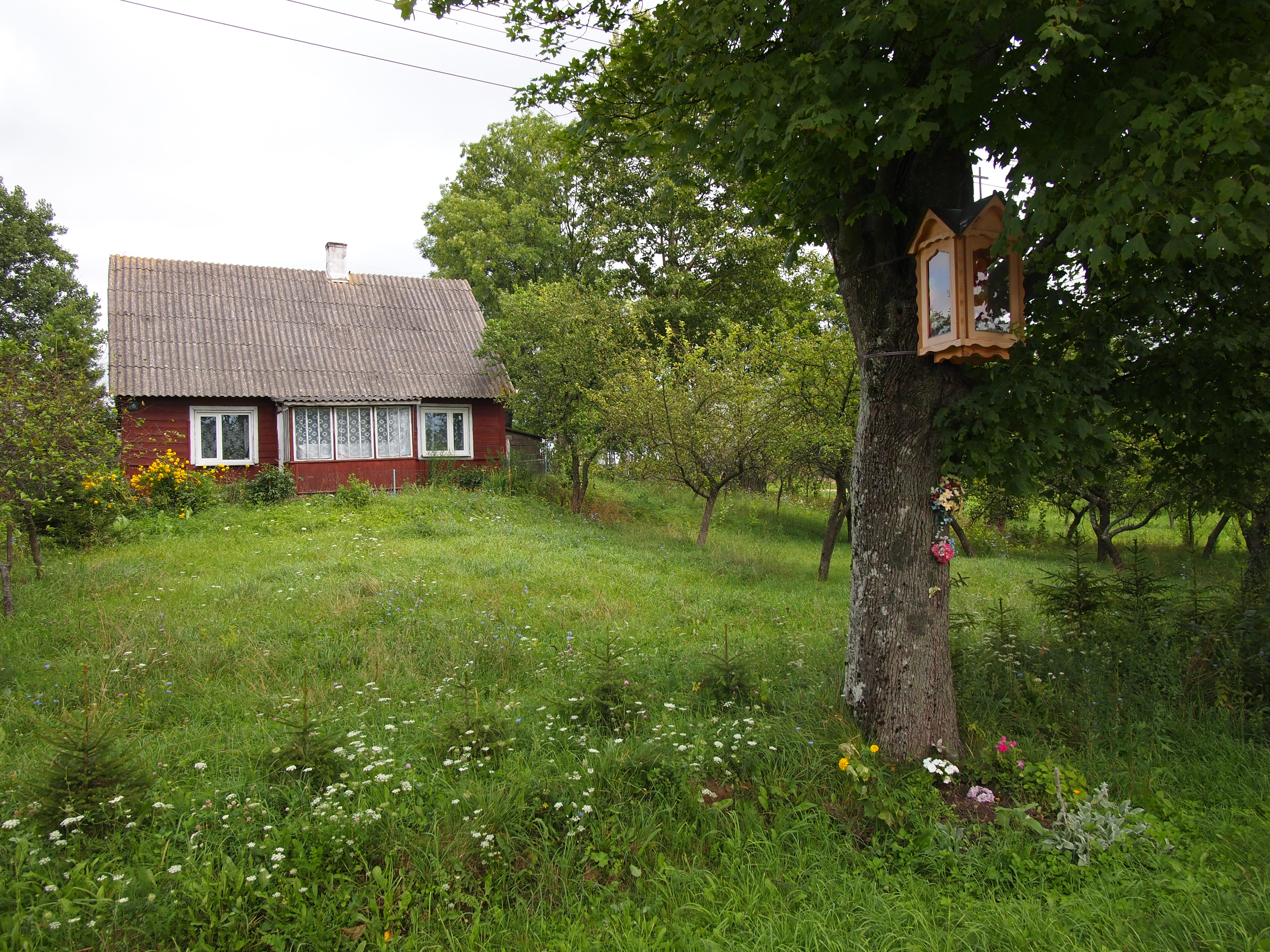

- Location within Poland
- Coordinates: 54°3′13″N 23°8′10″E
- Country: Poland
- Voivodeship: Podlaskie
- County: Sejny
- Gmina: Krasnopol
- Population: 241
- Postal code: 16-503
- Car plates: BSE

Mikołajewo [mikɔwaˈjɛvɔ], is a village in the administrative district of Gmina Krasnopol, within Sejny County, Podlaskie Voivodeship, in north-eastern Poland.

The faithful of the Roman Catholic Church belong to the parish of the Immaculate Conception of the Blessed Virgin Mary in Wigry.
