= Rutka, Suwałki County =

Village in Gmina Jeleniewo, Poland

Rutka
- Village
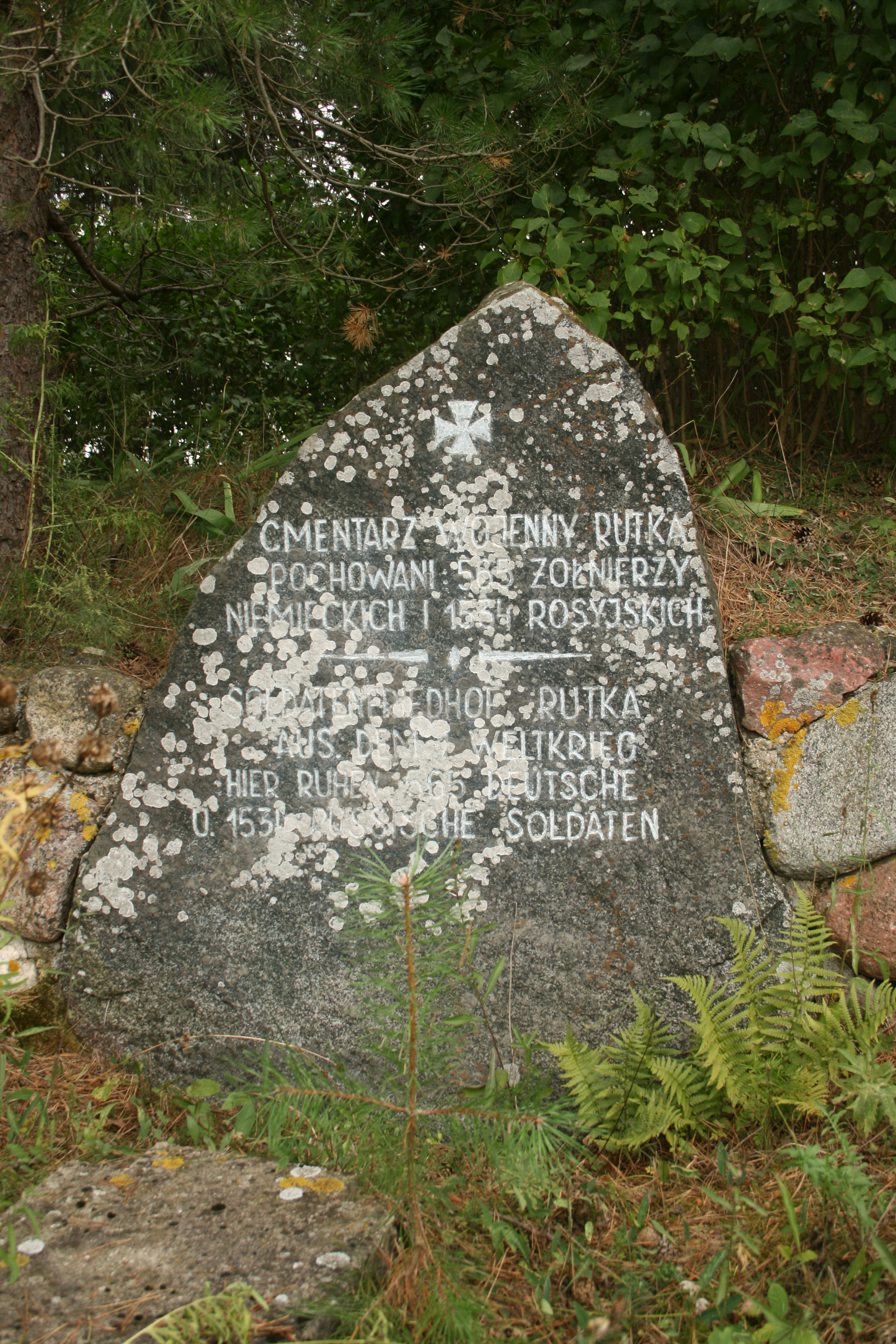
- World War I cemetery

- Location within Poland
- Coordinates: 54°12′56″N 22°50′17″E
- Country: Poland
- Voivodeship: Podlaskie
- County: Suwałki
- Gmina: Jeleniewo

Rutka [ˈrutka] is a village in the administrative district of Gmina Jeleniewo, within Suwałki County, Podlaskie Voivodeship, in north-eastern Poland.
