= Suchodoły, Podlaskie Voivodeship =

Suchodoły
- Village
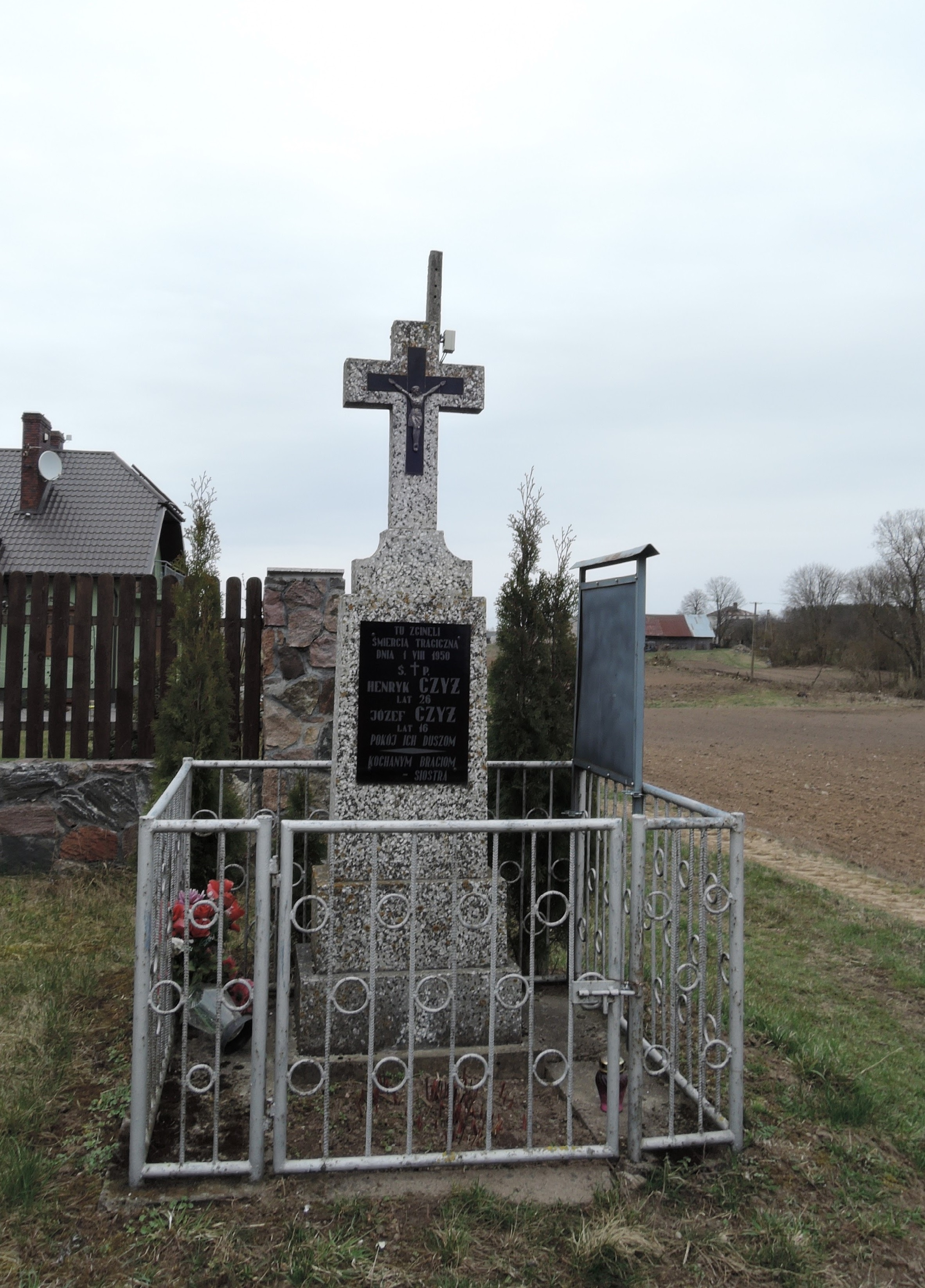

- Location within Poland
- Coordinates: 54°10′38″N 22°56′50″E
- Country: Poland
- Voivodeship: Podlaskie
- County: Suwałki
- Gmina: Jeleniewo

Suchodoły [suxɔˈdɔwɨ] is a village in the administrative district of Gmina Jeleniewo, within Suwałki County, Podlaskie Voivodeship, in north-eastern Poland.
