= Czerwone Bagno =

- Village
- Location within Poland
- Coordinates: 54°11′30″N 22°52′30″E
- Country: Poland
- Voivodeship: Podlaskie
- County: Suwałki
- Gmina: Jeleniewo

Czerwone Bagno [t͡ʂɛrˈvɔnɛ ˈbaɡnɔ] is a village in the administrative district of Gmina Jeleniewo, within Suwałki County, Podlaskie Voivodeship, in north-eastern Poland. Its name means "red bog".
