= Smolany Dąb =

- Village
- Location within Poland
- Coordinates: 54°6′N 23°13′E
- Country: Poland
- Voivodeship: Podlaskie
- County: Sejny
- Gmina: Krasnopol
- Population: 34
- Postal code: 16-503
- Car plates: BSE

Smolany Dąb [smɔˈlanɨ ˈdɔmp], is a village in the administrative district of Gmina Krasnopol, within Sejny County, Podlaskie Voivodeship, in north-eastern Poland. The village lies on the Gremzdy lake.

== History ==
In 1827 it was recorded that the population of the village numbered at 16 and 1 home and in 1889 it was numbered at 20 people and 5 homes.

== Tourist attractions ==
The following objects are included in the register of monuments of the National Heritage Institute:

- World War I war memorial (Reg. No.: 326 of 10.03.1983)
