= Suwałki Landscape Park =

Protected landscape in Poland

- Polish: Suwalski Park Krajobrazowy
- IUCN category V (protected landscape/seascape)
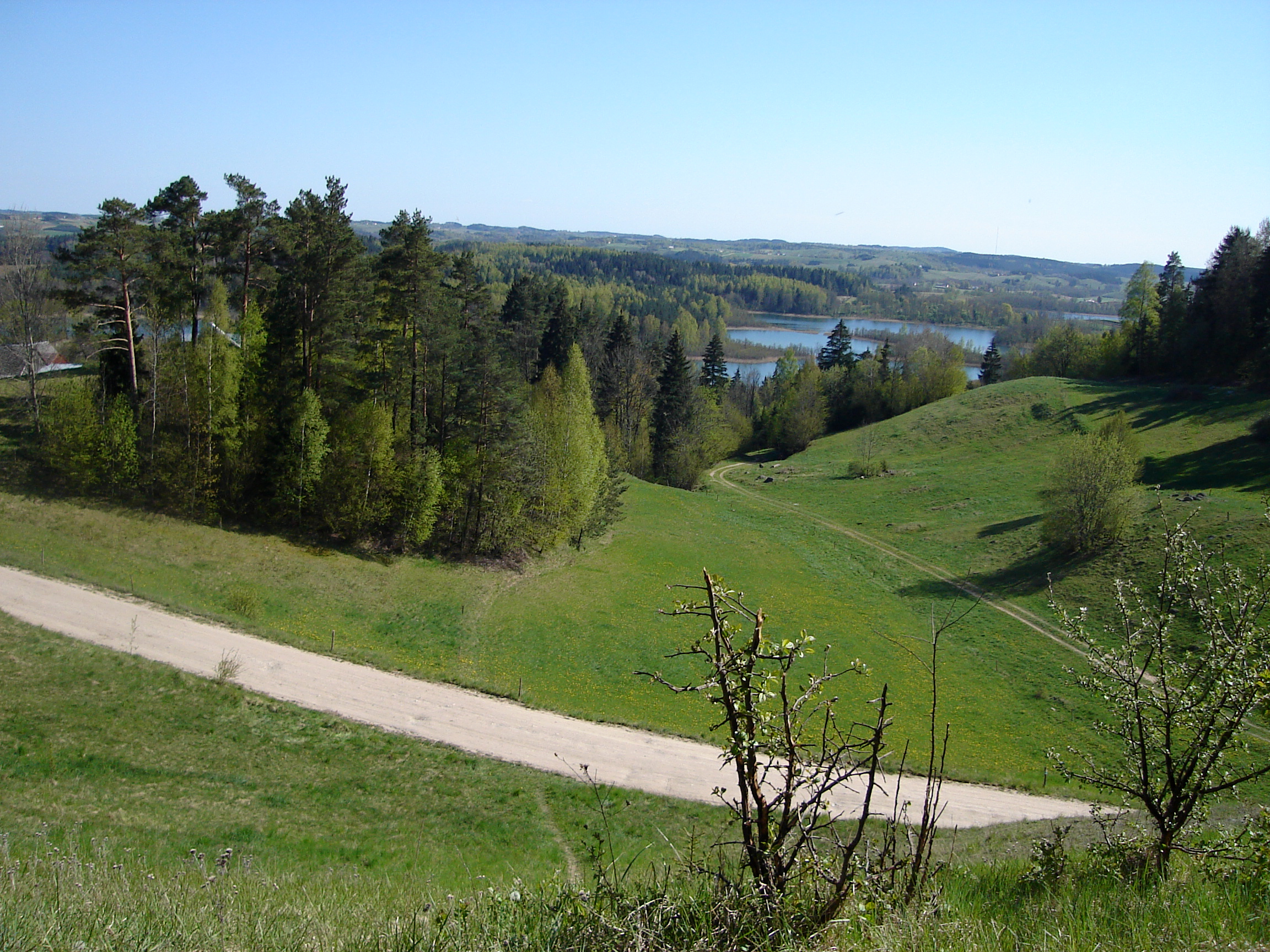
- Terminal moraine in the park Park logo

- Location within Poland
- Location: Podlaskie Voivodeship, Poland
- Nearest city: Jeleniewo
- Coordinates: 54°12′21″N 22°54′46″E
- Area: 62.84 km^{2} (24.26 sq mi)
- Established: 1976
- Governing body: Ministry of the Environment
- Website: www.spk.org.pl

Suwałki Landscape Park (Suwalski Park Krajobrazowy) is a protected area (Landscape Park) in north-eastern Poland, established in 1976, covering an area of 62.84 square kilometres (24.26 sq mi).

The area of the park is 6337.66 ha, of which approximately 60% is arable land, 10% water, 24% forests and trees, 4% marshy areas, and 2% other land. The lagging of the park covers 9306.24 ha.

The park lies within Podlaskie Voivodeship, in Suwałki County (Gmina Jeleniewo, Gmina Przerośl, Gmina Rutka-Tartak, Gmina Wiżajny).

Within the Landscape Park are three nature reserves.
