= Gremzdy Polskie =

- Village
- Location within Poland
- Coordinates: 54°5′N 23°12′E
- Country: Poland
- Voivodeship: Podlaskie
- County: Sejny
- Gmina: Krasnopol
- Population: 37
- Postal code: 16-503
- Car plates: BSE

Gremzdy Polskie [ˈɡrɛmzdɨ ˈpɔlskʲɛ], is a village in the administrative district of Gmina Krasnopol, within Sejny County, Podlaskie Voivodeship, in north-eastern Poland.

== Geography ==
Gremzdy Polskie lies near the to Gremzdy lake.

== History ==
In 1827 it was recorded that the population of the village numbered at 85 and 9 homes and in 1881 it was numbered at 139 people and 16 homes.
