= Wodziłki =

- Village
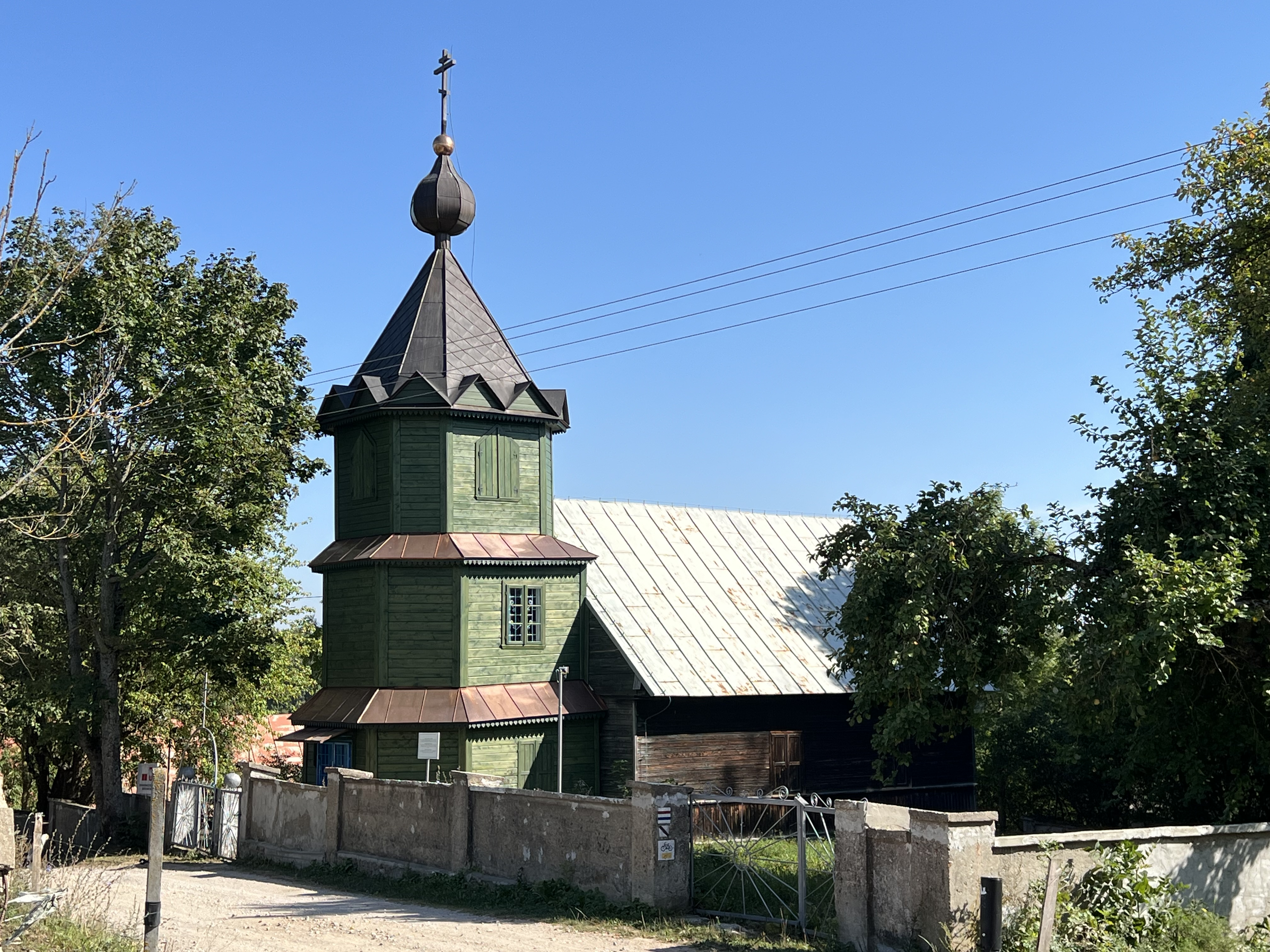

- Location within Poland
- Coordinates: 54°15′N 22°51′E
- Country: Poland
- Voivodeship: Podlaskie
- County: Suwałki
- Gmina: Jeleniewo
- Population: 70

Wodziłki [vɔˈd͡ʑiu̯ki] is a village in the administrative district of Gmina Jeleniewo, within Suwałki County, Podlaskie Voivodeship, in north-eastern Poland.
