= Leszczewo, Gmina Jeleniewo =

Leszczewo
- Village
- Location within Poland
- Coordinates: 54°12′10″N 22°57′47″E
- Country: Poland
- Voivodeship: Podlaskie
- County: Suwałki
- Gmina: Jeleniewo

Leszczewo [lɛʂˈt͡ʂɛvɔ] is a village in the administrative district of Gmina Jeleniewo, within Suwałki County, Podlaskie Voivodeship, in north-eastern Poland.
