= Okrągłe, Podlaskie Voivodeship =

Okrągłe
- Village
- Location within Poland
- Coordinates: 54°12′N 22°51′E
- Country: Poland
- Voivodeship: Podlaskie
- County: Suwałki
- Gmina: Jeleniewo

Okrągłe [ɔˈkrɔŋɡwɛ] is a village in the administrative district of Gmina Jeleniewo, within Suwałki County, Podlaskie Voivodeship, in north-eastern Poland.

== Climate ==
The Köppen Climate Classification subtype for this climate is "Dfb". (Warm Summer Continental Climate).

Climate data for Okrągłe, Podlaskie Voivodeship
Month	Jan	Feb	Mar	Apr	May	Jun	Jul	Aug	Sep	Oct	Nov	Dec	Year
Record high °C (°F)	9.6 (49.3)	10.9 (51.6)	16.8 (62.2)	24.9 (76.8)	29.2 (84.6)	32.2 (90.0)	34.6 (94.3)	35.2 (95.4)	30.8 (87.4)	23.9 (75.0)	13.9 (57.0)	11.3 (52.3)	35.2 (95.4)
Mean daily maximum °C (°F)	−2.8 (27.0)	−2.5 (27.5)	2.1 (35.8)	10.2 (50.4)	18.5 (65.3)	20.6 (69.1)	22.4 (72.3)	21.4 (70.5)	16.4 (61.5)	11.8 (53.2)	4.0 (39.2)	−0.5 (31.1)	10.1 (50.2)
Daily mean °C (°F)	−4.7 (23.5)	−4.3 (24.3)	−0.5 (31.1)	6.0 (42.8)	12.9 (55.2)	15.2 (59.4)	17.2 (63.0)	16.1 (61.0)	11.8 (53.2)	6.9 (44.4)	1.3 (34.3)	−2.3 (27.9)	6.3 (43.3)
Mean daily minimum °C (°F)	−6.6 (20.1)	−6.1 (21.0)	−3.1 (26.4)	1.8 (35.2)	7.3 (45.1)	9.8 (49.6)	12.0 (53.6)	10.8 (51.4)	7.2 (45.0)	2.0 (35.6)	−1.4 (29.5)	−4.1 (24.6)	2.5 (36.5)
Record low °C (°F)	−30.6 (−23.1)	−30.3 (−22.5)	−28.8 (−19.8)	−12.3 (9.9)	−5.0 (23.0)	−1.5 (29.3)	1.7 (35.1)	0.4 (32.7)	−4.6 (23.7)	−14.2 (6.4)	−22.1 (−7.8)	−26.8 (−16.2)	−30.6 (−23.1)
Average precipitation mm (inches)	36 (1.4)	25 (1.0)	31 (1.2)	38 (1.5)	53 (2.1)	78 (3.1)	77 (3.0)	77 (3.0)	53 (2.1)	47 (1.9)	47 (1.9)	41 (1.6)	603 (23.7)
Average precipitation days	15	13	15	12	12	14	15	14	13	16	15	15	169
Average relative humidity (%)	85	85	85	82	77	77	79	80	80	82	85	86	82
Mean monthly sunshine hours	35	53	92	153	219	225	222	212	150	89	46	32	1,528
Source 1: http://www.imigw.pl
Source 2: https://web.archive.org/web/20130527024216/http://www.stat.gov.pl/cps/rde/xchg/gus
