= Bachanowo =

- Village
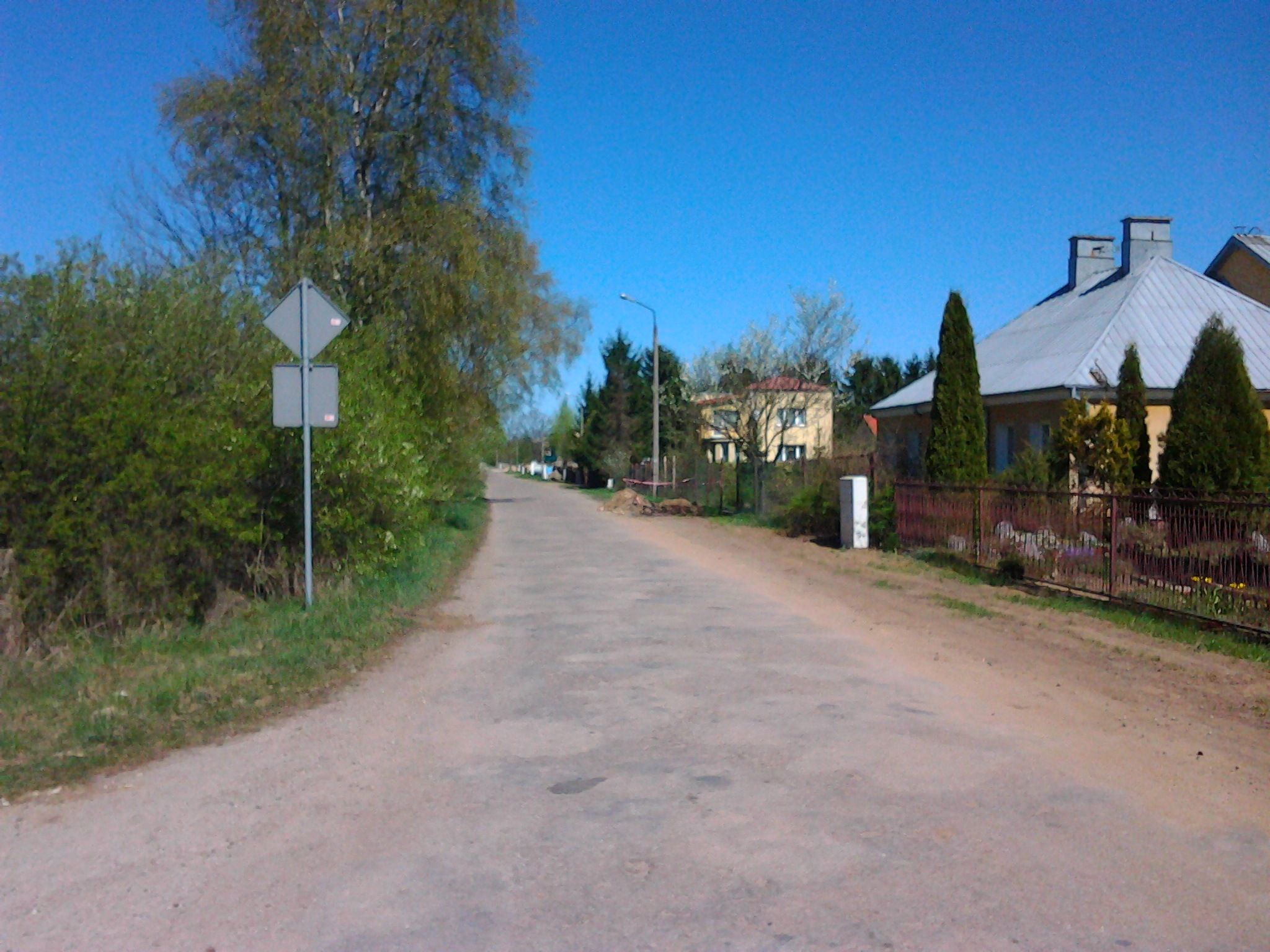

- Location within Poland
- Coordinates: 54°15′N 22°48′E
- Country: Poland
- Voivodeship: Podlaskie
- County: Suwałki
- Gmina: Jeleniewo
- Population: 80

Bachanowo [baxaˈnɔvɔ] is a village in the administrative district of Gmina Jeleniewo, within Suwałki County, Podlaskie Voivodeship, in north-eastern Poland.
