= Białorogi =

- Village
- Location within Poland
- Coordinates: 54°10′N 22°58′E
- Country: Poland
- Voivodeship: Podlaskie
- County: Suwałki
- Gmina: Jeleniewo
- Time zone: UTC+1 (CET)
  - Summer (DST): UTC+2 (CEST)
- Vehicle registration: BSU

Białorogi [bjawɔˈrɔɡi] is a village in the administrative district of Gmina Jeleniewo, within Suwałki County, Podlaskie Voivodeship, in north-eastern Poland.

== History ==
Following the German-Soviet invasion of Poland, which started World War II in September 1939, the village was occupied by Germany until 1944. On 30 March 1944, the Polish underground Home Army liberated a group of prisoners from German captivity in Białorogi.
