= Teklinowo =

- Village
- Location within Poland
- Coordinates: 54°04′40″N 23°14′25″E
- Country: Poland
- Voivodeship: Podlaskie
- County: Sejny
- Gmina: Krasnopol
- Postal code: 16-503
- Car plates: BSE

Teklinowo [tɛkliˈnɔvɔ], is a village in the administrative district of Gmina Krasnopol, within Sejny County, Podlaskie Voivodeship, in north-eastern Poland.
