= Czarna Buchta =

- Village
- Location within Poland
- Coordinates: 54°9′N 23°10′E
- Country: Poland
- Voivodeship: Podlaskie
- County: Sejny
- Gmina: Krasnopol
- Population: 41
- Postal code: 16-503
- Car plates: BSE

Czarna Buchta [ˈt͡ʂarna ˈbuxta], is a village in the administrative district of Gmina Krasnopol, within Sejny County, Podlaskie Voivodeship, in north-eastern Poland.

== History ==
In 1880 it was documented that the village was populated by 34 with 3 homes.
