= Jeleniewo =

- Village
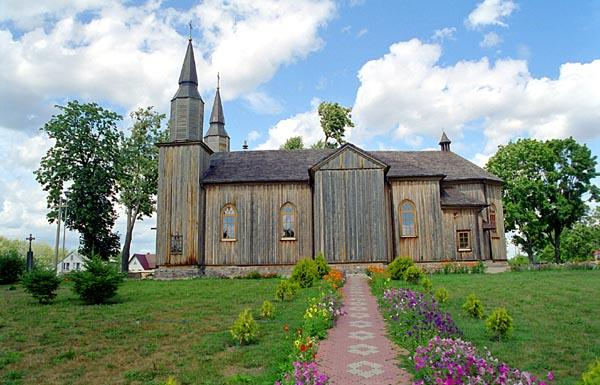
- Sacred Heart of Jesus Church in Jeleniewo

- Location within Poland
- Coordinates: 54°12′21″N 22°54′46″E
- Country: Poland
- Voivodeship: Podlaskie
- County: Suwałki
- Gmina: Jeleniewo

Population
  - Total: 3,092
- Time zone: UTC+1 (CET)
  - Summer (DST): UTC+2 (CEST)
- Vehicle registration: BSU

Jeleniewo [jɛlɛˈɲɛvɔ] is a village in Suwałki County, Podlaskie Voivodeship, in north-eastern Poland. It is the seat of the gmina (administrative district) called Gmina Jeleniewo.

== History ==
In 1771, King of Poland and Grand Duke of Lithuania Stanisław August Poniatowski established a Catholic parish church in Jeleniewo. Afterwards, thanks to royal administrator Antoni Tyzenhaus, the village was developed into a town in 10 years. It was granted town rights in 1782, however, it lost them in 1800. The settlement grew regardless, however, it was overshadowed by the nearby city of Suwałki and its notable growth. In years 1815–1829, a postal road connecting Warsaw and Saint Petersburg ran through the village.

Following the German-Soviet invasion of Poland, which started World War II in September 1939, the village was occupied by Germany until 1944. In April 1940, the Germans arrested local Polish priest Władysław Brzozowski, and then deported him to concentration camps (see Nazi crimes against the Polish nation). He was liberated in the Dachau concentration camp in 1945. On 19 March 1944, Polish partisans of the Home Army attacked a German military post in the village.

Afterwards, Jeleniewo was restored to Poland, although with a Soviet-installed communist regime, which stayed in power until the Fall of Communism in the 1980s. The Polish anti-communist resistance was active in Jeleniewo, and in 1945–1947, it carried out two raids on the local communist police station.

== Climate ==
The Köppen Climate Classification subtype for this climate is "Dfb". (Warm Summer Continental Climate).

Climate data for Jeleniewoi
Month	Jan	Feb	Mar	Apr	May	Jun	Jul	Aug	Sep	Oct	Nov	Dec	Year
Record high °C (°F)	9.6 (49.3)	10.9 (51.6)	16.8 (62.2)	24.9 (76.8)	29.2 (84.6)	32.2 (90.0)	34.6 (94.3)	35.2 (95.4)	30.8 (87.4)	23.9 (75.0)	13.9 (57.0)	11.3 (52.3)	35.2 (95.4)
Mean daily maximum °C (°F)	−2.8 (27.0)	−2.5 (27.5)	2.1 (35.8)	10.2 (50.4)	18.5 (65.3)	20.6 (69.1)	22.4 (72.3)	21.4 (70.5)	16.4 (61.5)	11.8 (53.2)	4.0 (39.2)	−0.5 (31.1)	10.1 (50.2)
Daily mean °C (°F)	−4.7 (23.5)	−4.3 (24.3)	−0.5 (31.1)	6.0 (42.8)	12.9 (55.2)	15.2 (59.4)	17.2 (63.0)	16.1 (61.0)	11.8 (53.2)	6.9 (44.4)	1.3 (34.3)	−2.3 (27.9)	6.3 (43.3)
Mean daily minimum °C (°F)	−6.6 (20.1)	−6.1 (21.0)	−3.1 (26.4)	1.8 (35.2)	7.3 (45.1)	9.8 (49.6)	12.0 (53.6)	10.8 (51.4)	7.2 (45.0)	2.0 (35.6)	−1.4 (29.5)	−4.1 (24.6)	2.5 (36.5)
Record low °C (°F)	−30.6 (−23.1)	−30.3 (−22.5)	−28.8 (−19.8)	−12.3 (9.9)	−5.0 (23.0)	−1.5 (29.3)	1.7 (35.1)	0.4 (32.7)	−4.6 (23.7)	−14.2 (6.4)	−22.1 (−7.8)	−26.8 (−16.2)	−30.6 (−23.1)
Average precipitation mm (inches)	36 (1.4)	25 (1.0)	31 (1.2)	38 (1.5)	53 (2.1)	78 (3.1)	77 (3.0)	77 (3.0)	53 (2.1)	47 (1.9)	47 (1.9)	41 (1.6)	603 (23.7)
Average precipitation days	15	13	15	12	12	14	15	14	13	16	15	15	169
Average relative humidity (%)	85	85	85	82	77	77	79	80	80	82	85	86	82
Mean monthly sunshine hours	35	53	92	153	219	225	222	212	150	89	46	32	1,528
Source 1: http://www.imigw.pl
Source 2: http://www.stat.gov.pl/cps/rde/xchg/gus
