= Łopuchowo, Suwałki County =

Łopuchowo
- Village
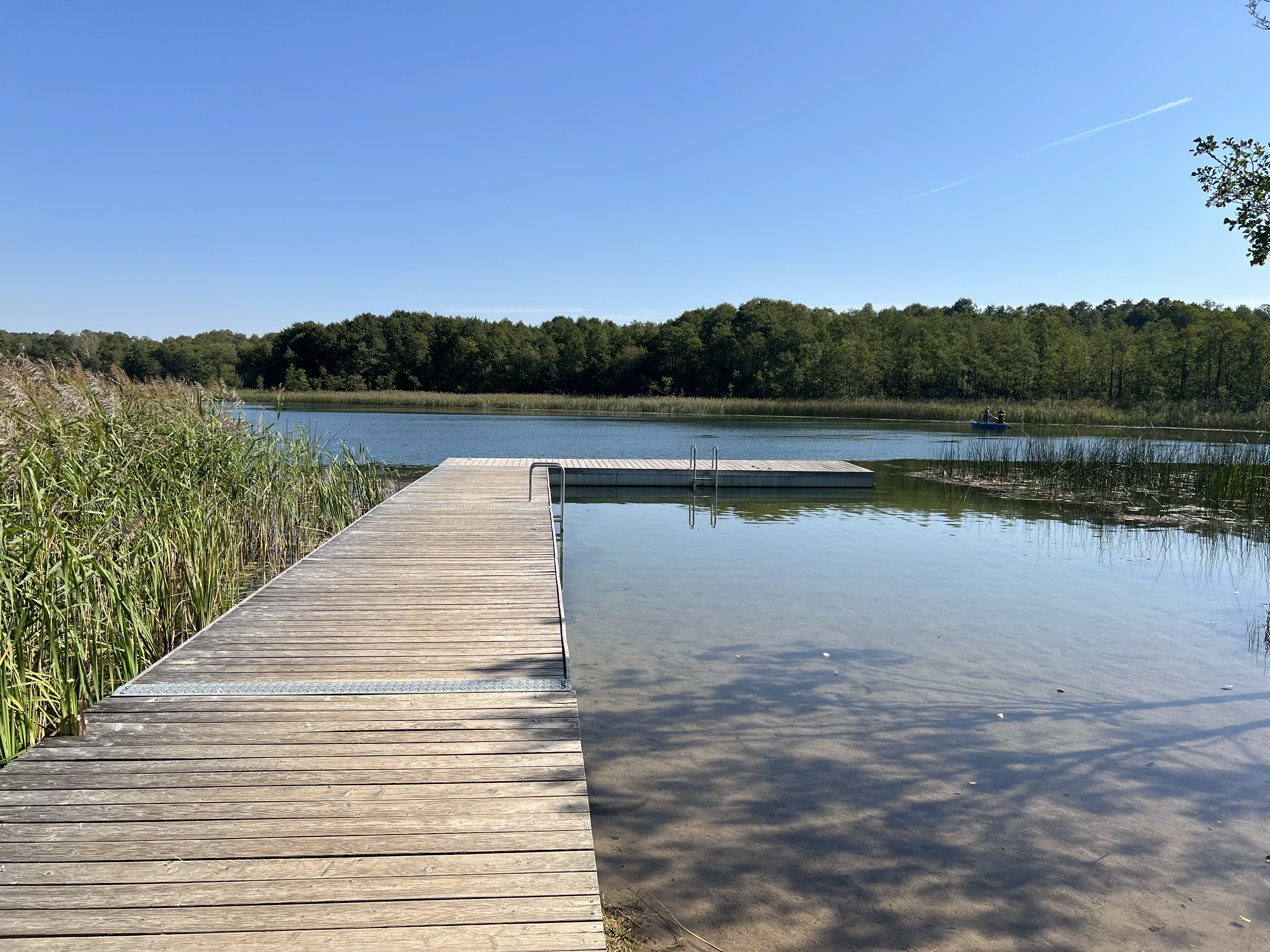

- Location within Poland
- Coordinates: 54°16′N 22°52′E
- Country: Poland
- Voivodeship: Podlaskie
- County: Suwałki
- Gmina: Jeleniewo

Łopuchowo [wɔpuˈxɔvɔ] is a village in the administrative district of Gmina Jeleniewo, within Suwałki County, Podlaskie Voivodeship, in north-eastern Poland.
