= Łopuchowo, Sejny County =

Łopuchowo
- Village
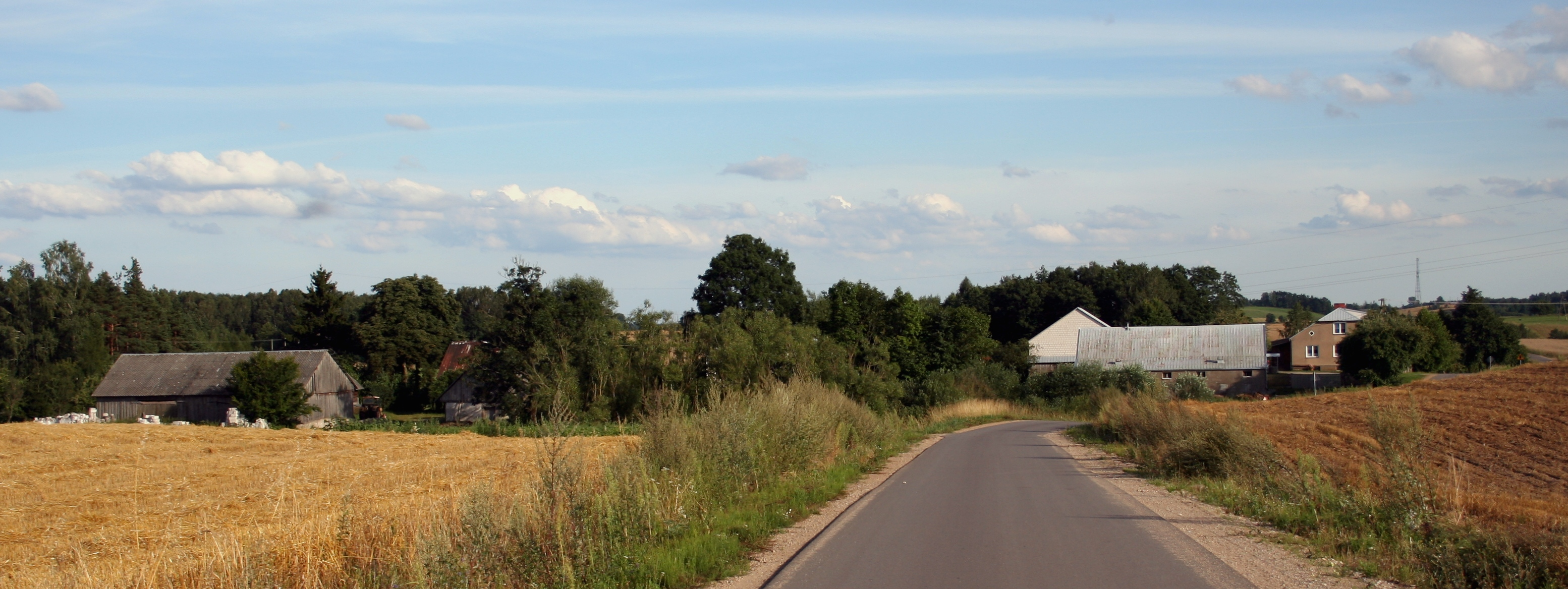

- Location within Poland
- Coordinates: 54°6′N 23°18′E
- Country: Poland
- Voivodeship: Podlaskie
- County: Sejny
- Gmina: Krasnopol
- Population: 48
- Postal code: 16-503
- Car plates: BSE

Łopuchowo [wɔpuˈxɔvɔ], is a village in the administrative district of Gmina Krasnopol, within Sejny County, Podlaskie Voivodeship, in north-eastern Poland.

== History ==
In 1884 it was documented that the population of the village was 87 people and 11 homes
