= Żłobin, Podlaskie Voivodeship =

Żłobin
- Village
- Location within Poland
- Coordinates: 54°05′16″N 23°14′46″E
- Country: Poland
- Voivodeship: Podlaskie
- County: Sejny
- Gmina: Krasnopol
- Population: 67
- Postal code: 16-503
- Car plates: BSE

Żłobin ([ˈʐwɔbin]) is a village in the administrative district of Gmina Krasnopol, within Sejny County, Podlaskie Voivodeship, in north-eastern Poland.

== History ==
The noble village was located at the end of the 18th century in the Grodno district of the Trakai Voivodeship in the Grand Duchy of Lithuania.

In 1827 it was recorded that the population of the village numbered at 127 and 12 homes and in 1895 it was numbered at 152 people and 19 homes.
