= Krasnopol, Podlaskie Voivodeship =

Krasnopol
- Village
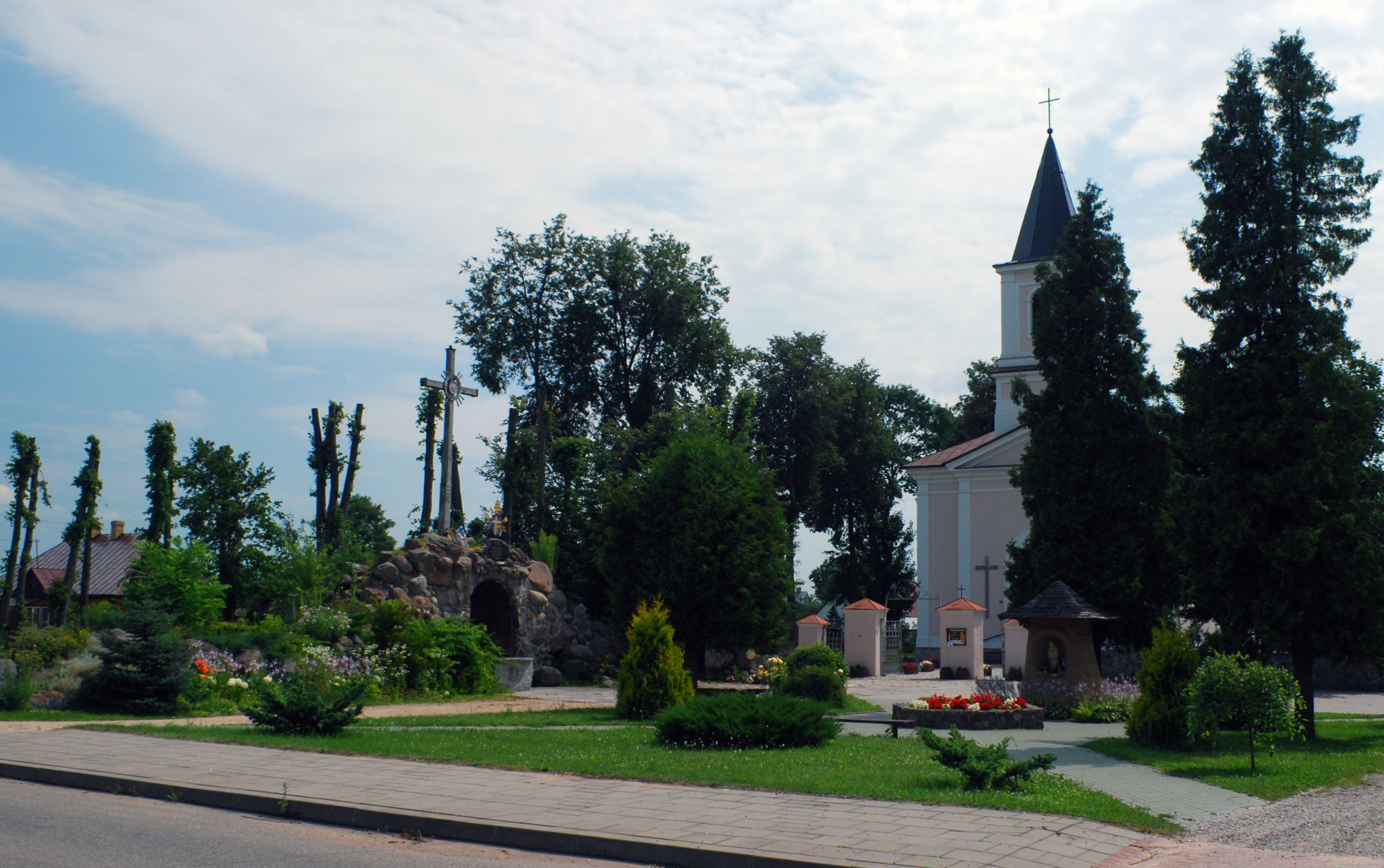
- Church of the Transfiguration of Christ

- Location within Poland
- Coordinates: 54°6′57″N 23°12′25″E
- Country: Poland
- Voivodeship: Podlaskie
- County: Sejny
- Gmina: Krasnopol

Population
  - Total: 1,300

Krasnopol ([krasˈnɔpɔl]; Lithuanian: Krasnapolis) is a village in Sejny County, Podlaskie Voivodeship, in north-eastern Poland. It is the seat of the gmina (administrative district) called Gmina Krasnopol.

Krasnopol was founded in 1770 on the order of Antoni Tyzenhauz in the Opidemie forest on the road from Sejny to Wigry and Suwałki. It was probably granted town privileges in 1782.

== See also ==
- Krasnopol (weapon system)

== Sources ==
- VLKK (2002). "Atvirkštinis lietuvių kalboje vartojamų tradicinių Lenkijos vietovardžių formų sąrašas" (PDF). VLKK (in Lithuanian). Archived from the original (PDF) on 2012-02-14.
