= Stare Boksze =

Stare Boksze Seni Bokšiai
- Village
- Location within Poland
- Coordinates: 54°10′38″N 23°10′32″E
- Country: Poland
- Voivodeship: Podlaskie
- County: Sejny
- Gmina: Puńsk
- Population: 53
- Postal code: 16-515
- Car plates: BSE

Stare Boksze ([ˈstarɛ ˈbɔkʂɛ]; Lithuanian: Seni Bokšiai) is a village in the administrative district of Gmina Puńsk, within Sejny County, Podlaskie Voivodeship, in north-eastern Poland, close to the border with Lithuania.

== History ==
The village is first mentioned in the inventory of forestry goods from 1639. The name of the village comes from the surname of the Bokszewicz family, known in Lithuania since the first half of the 16th century.

The first mention of Boksze-Osada is from inventory of forestry goods in 1639. At that time, the village, located on the south-western shore of Lake Sejwy Czarne (now Boksze), consisted of seven fibres and was inhabited by eight ploughmen equipped with half-fibres of land. In addition, they received 2 fibres of land, from which they paid an annual rent of 2 kopecks of Lithuanian pennies. The task of the ploughmen was to protect the Merecko-Premyslomsk-Perstunska Forest from further colonisation and destruction of the backwoods and illegal extraction of timber and forest riches.

The Geographical Dictionary of the Kingdom of Poland mentions two adjacent villages, Boksze Stare and Nowe. The Stare Boksze village had in 1880, 198 inhabitants, Boksze Nowe had 162.

== Sources ==
- VLKK (2002). "Atvirkštinis lietuvių kalboje vartojamų tradicinių Lenkijos vietovardžių formų sąrašas" (PDF). VLKK (in Lithuanian). Archived from the original (PDF) on 2012-02-14.
