= Łumbie =

- Village
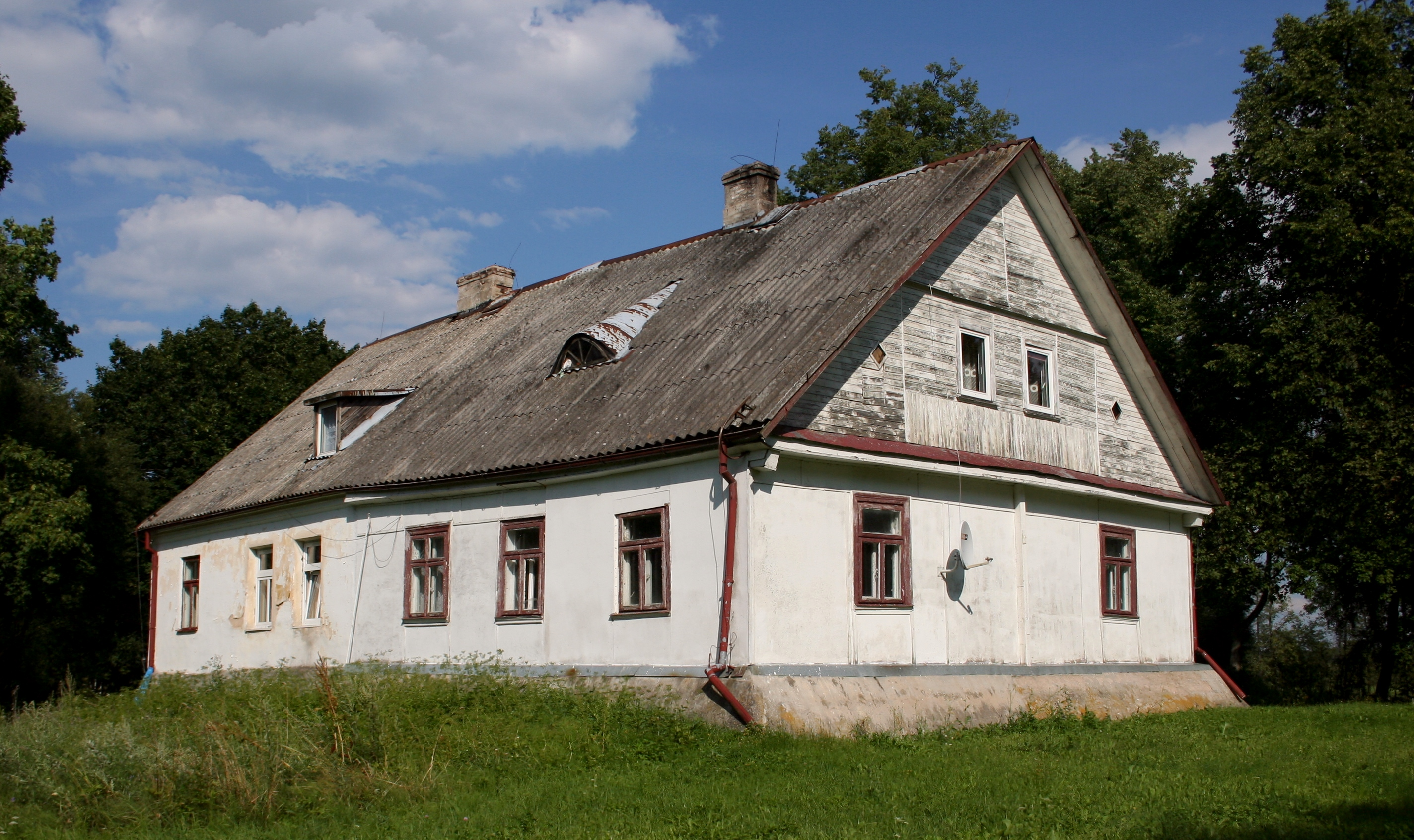
- School in Łumbie

- Location within Poland
- Coordinates: 54°9′N 23°20′E
- Country: Poland
- Voivodeship: Podlaskie
- County: Sejny
- Gmina: Gmina Sejny
- Website: www.moje-lumbie.prv.pl

Łumbie [ˈwumbjɛ], is a village in the administrative district of Gmina Sejny, within Sejny County, Podlaskie Voivodeship, in north-eastern Poland, close to the border with Lithuania.

== History ==
The first mention dates from 1684. The village used to belong to Sztabinki's property, which in the eighteenth century disintegrated into several estates. Farm with the village and Gryszkańce and Staszkuny acquired in the eighties of this century from Mateusz (eng. Matthew) Narzymowski czesnik Owrucka Province - Maciej Tadeusz Eysmont of Krasnohruda (Krasnogruda). In those days the village was founded estates Łumbie Berżynie and Żagówiec which occurred near Inn. In 1832, when the inheritance was divided after Eysymont, Łumbie property received Petronela Paszkiewiczowa of Eysymont family, then belonged to Bronisława Paszkiewiczówna, married to Mejer. At the beginning of the twentieth century passed into the Dochowie's hands. Their last owner, Henryk (eng. Henry), who knew twelve languages, having a sound agricultural and horticultural education, gained in England and France, failed to retain 172 hectares. Property was taken over Earth's Credit Society, and Doch settled in part of the property belonging to his wife. This part of the land he sold after the war.

== Landmarks ==
At the junction of highways is a monumental, stone chapel, and further, on the left shoulder for the catchment of milk, there is a last recorded Doch's seat, and with her pretty clay barn, erected after the war. At the next corner is located an old manor house, which until recently was in elementary school. Today it is private property. This is an interesting building - a small, half-clay, half of wood, decorated with shaped porch. In 1977 in the village was carried out archaeological research, as a result of which were found remains of settlements wzesnośredniowiecznej: Resource traces of pits, fragments of pottery, including clay span and a ring made of bronze.
