= Berżniki =

- Village
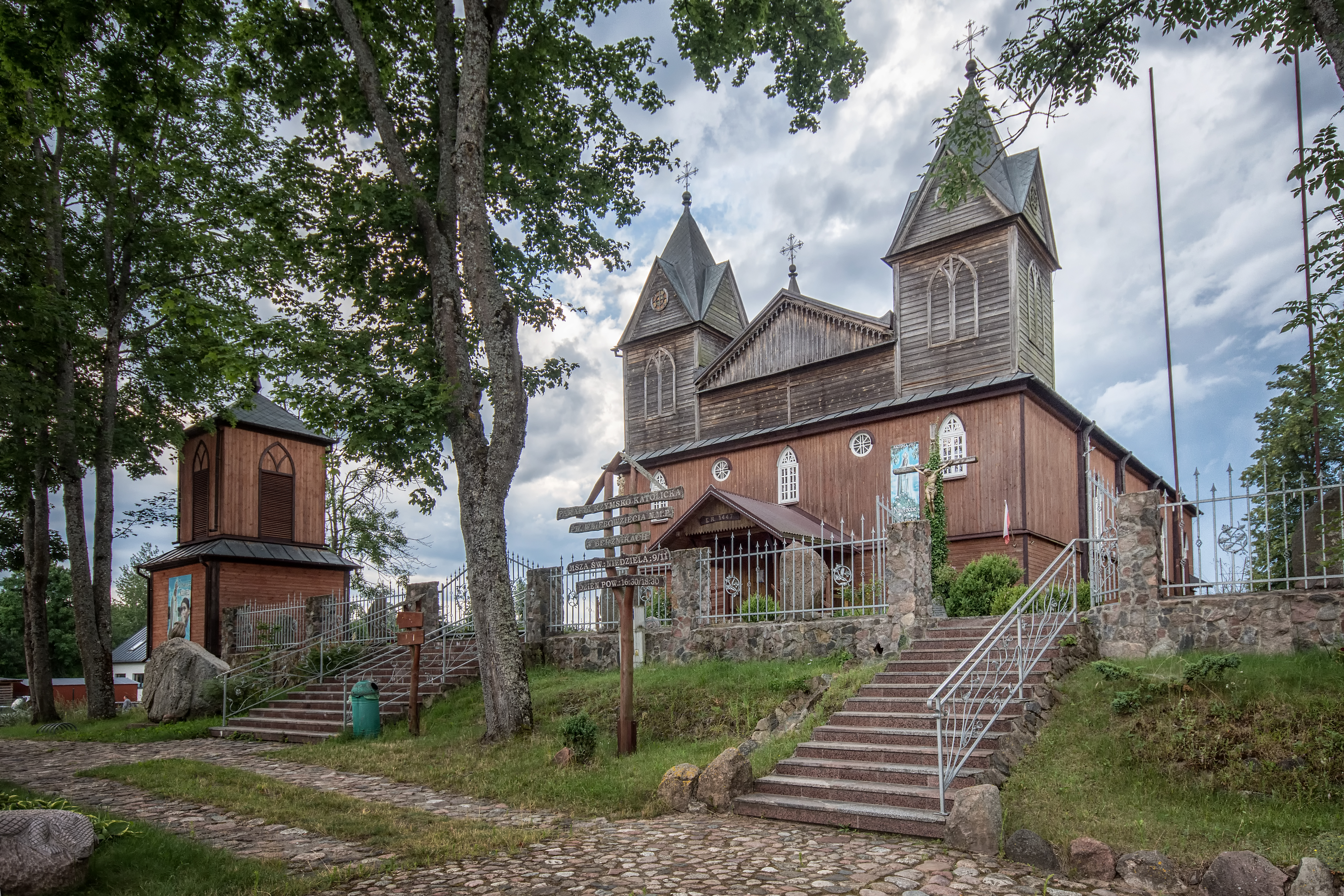
- Church of the Assumption in Berżniki

- Location within Poland
- Coordinates: 54°5′N 23°27′E
- Country: Poland
- Voivodeship: Podlaskie
- County: Sejny
- Gmina: Sejny
- Founder: Bona Sforza
- Population: 320
- Time zone: UTC+1 (CET)
  - Summer (DST): UTC+2 (CEST)
- Postal code: 16-500
- Vehicle registration: BSE

Berżniki ([bɛrʐˈniki]; Lithuanian: Beržininkai, Berznykas) is a village in the administrative district of Gmina Sejny, within Sejny County, Podlaskie Voivodeship, in north-eastern Poland, close to the border with Lithuania.

== Etymology ==
Berżniki's name originates from the Sudovian language.

== History ==
=== Early modern period ===
In 1524, the Berżniki manor founded by Mykolas Pacas, the deputy of the Przełom forest, is mentioned. Berżniki was built in 1547–57 by order of Queen of Poland Bona Sforza. Berżniki was granted town rights by Queen Bona Sforza in 1551. The town had 70 houses in 1560. At that time, Pac built the first church. A distillery, a mill, and a brickyard operated near the manor.

After the Deluge in the mid-17th century, Jews, Masovians, and Old Believer Russians began living in Berżniki alongside the native Lithuanians. Until 1795, Berżniki belonged to the Trakai Voivodeship of the Grand Duchy of Lithuania within the Polish–Lithuanian Commonwealth.

=== Late modern period ===
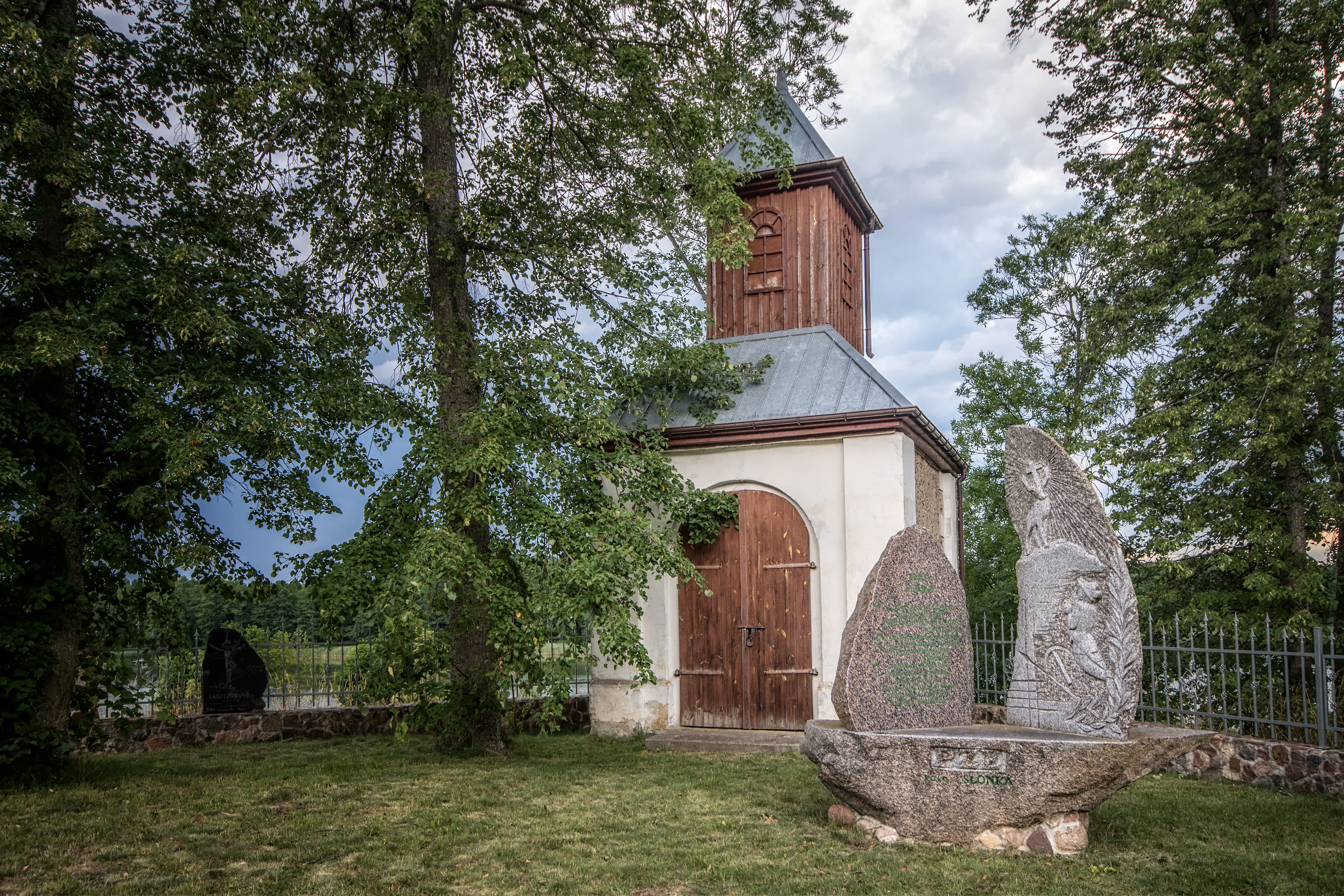
Old chapel in Berżniki

In 1795, as a result of the Third Partition of Poland, the village became part of the New East Prussia of the Kingdom of Prussia. In 1797, there were 69 houses in the village. Berżniki was part of the Polish Duchy of Warsaw from 1807 to 1815, and then part of the Russian-ruled Congress Poland. Berżniki lost its town rights after 1810. From 1837, Berżniki was in the Augustów, later Suwałki Governorates. Cyriak Accord lived in Berżniki in 1856–64.

On 25 June 1863, the rebel squads of Feliks Kołyszko, V. Hlaska and L. Čempinskis clashed with the Imperial Russian Army near Berżniki.

Historical population
Year	Pop.	±%
1797	334	—
1827	464	+38.9%
1880	729	+57.1%
1921	373	−48.8%

=== 20th century ===
Until the early 20th century, most of the parishioners (about 6,000 people) were Lithuanian, but due to the influence of the manors, the church and the Polish schools, the population began to be rapidly Polonized.

In 1904, at the request of the Lithuanians, services were held in the church in Lithuanian and Polish, but the Lithuanians were forcefully expelled from the church by Poles and Polonized Lithuanians, leading to 18 injured people. After these events, the church was closed for 3 years.

On September 22, 1920, a major battle between the Lithuanian and Polish armies took place here. The Lithuanians were forced to retreat by the much larger Polish forces, but the further Polish attack was stopped. In Berżniki and its surroundings, there are quite a few cemeteries and graves of Polish and Lithuanian soldiers, the latter being looked after by local Lithuanians.

According to the 1921 Polish census, there were 373 inhabitants in Berżniki, exclusively Polish by nationality and Roman Catholic by confession.

During the German occupation (World War II), the Germans arrested the local Polish parish priest Józef Śledziński in April 1940 and then imprisoned him in Suwałki and the Soldau and Sachsenhausen concentration camps. He died after being beaten by the Germans in Sachsenhausen in August 1940 (see Nazi crimes against the Polish nation). Works of art and vital records were looted by the Germans from the local church and taken to Königsberg.

In 1988 and 1989, Lithuanian linguists organized expeditions to Berżniki.

== Sources ==
- Guzewicz, Wojciech (2019). "Berżniki jako ośrodek kościelny na Sejneńszczyźnie (zagadnienia wybrane)" (PDF). Civitas et Lex. 21.
- GUS (1924). Skorowidz miejscowości Rzeczypospolitej Polskiej: opracowany na podstawie wyników pierwszego powszechnego spisu ludności z dn. 30 września 1921 r. i innych źródeł urzędowych [Index of towns and cities in the Republic of Poland: prepared on the basis of the results of the first general population census of September 30, 1921 and other official sources] (in Polish). Vol. 17: Województwo białostockie. Warsaw: Główny Urząd Statystyczny.
- Vidugiris, Aloyzas (2018). "Berznykas". Universal Lithuanian Encyclopedia (in Lithuanian).
- VLKK (2002). "Atvirkštinis lietuvių kalboje vartojamų tradicinių Lenkijos vietovardžių formų sąrašas" (PDF). VLKK (in Lithuanian). Archived from the original (PDF) on 2012-02-14.
