= Transport in Podlaskie Voivodeship =

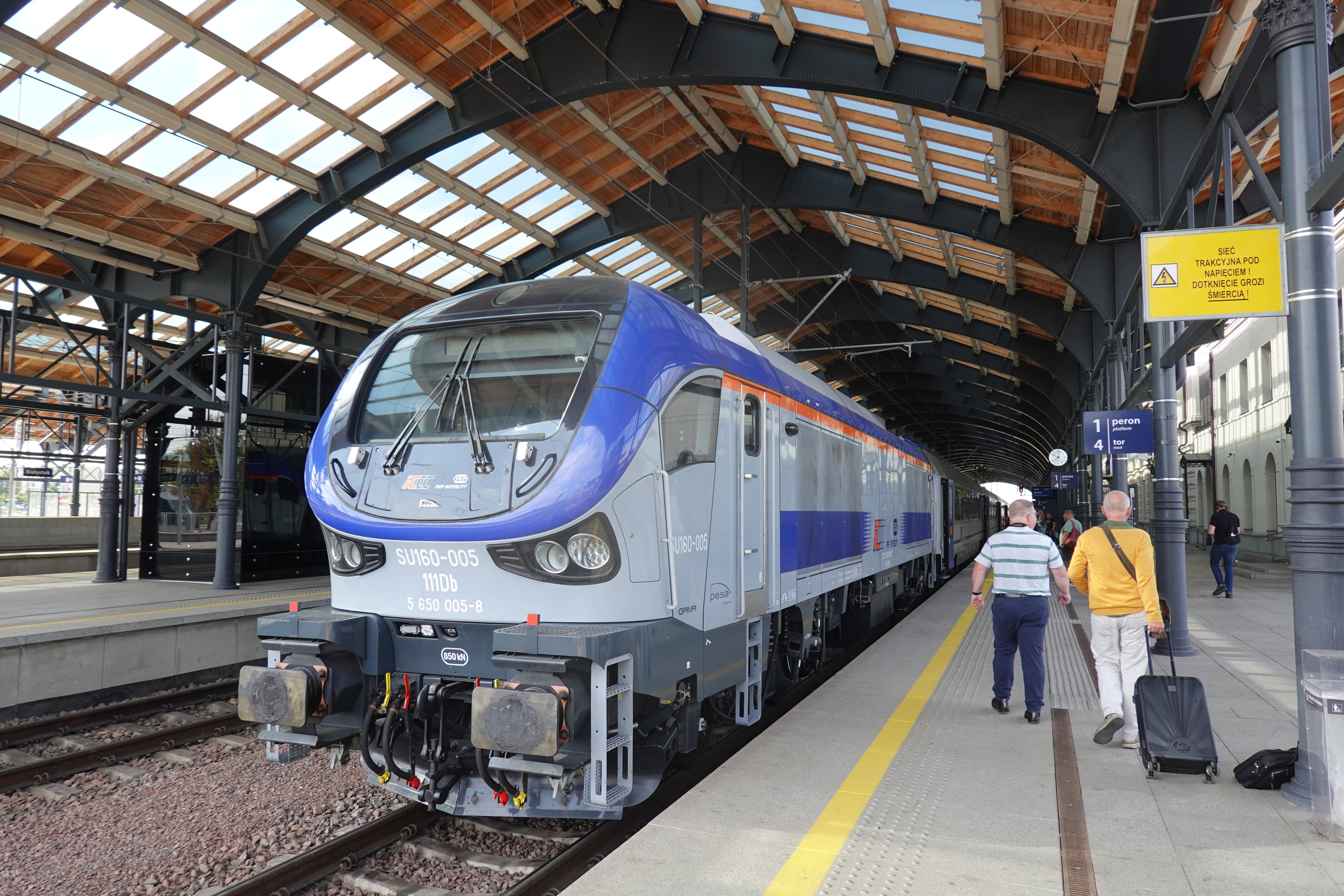
Białystok railway station

Białystok is, and has been for centuries, the main hub of transportation for the Podlaskie Voivodeship and the entire northeastern section of Poland. It is a major city on the European Union roadways (Via Baltica) and railways (Rail Baltica) to the Baltic Republics and Finland. It is also a main gateway of trade with Belarus due to its proximity to the border and its current and longstanding relationship with Hrodno, Belarus. Passenger trains do connect from Suvalki, Hrodno and Lithuania to Warsaw and the rest of the European passenger network. An extensive public transportation system is provided within the city by three bus services, but no tram or subway exists.

A civil airport, Białystok-Krywlany Airport, lies within the city limits, but does not provide regularly scheduled service. There are plans to build a new regional airport, Białystok-Saniki Airport, in the next few years that will provide flights within Europe.

== Railways ==

Passenger services is provided by two rail service providers:

- PKP Intercity - runs only Intercity and TLK trains to Białystok, Intercity class trains are mostly operated using ED161 EMU's with a restaurant car and a first and second class - both of which have mandatory seat reservation. TLK class trains are operated using older 1990's era modernised train stock, first and second class seats are to be expected and mandatory seat reservation is in place, the only two TLK trains running to Białystok do not include a restaurant car.
- Polregio - runs only regional passenger trains financed by the voivodeship. Passenger trains are mostly run using diesel multiple units (usually SA133, SA105 and SA106) on non-electrified lines or modernised EN57AL and EN57ALd units on electrified lines.

Polregio provides service on the following routes:

- Białystok - Sokółka - Augustów - Suwałki
- Białystok - Sokółka - Kuźnica Białystok- ~~Hrodno, Belarus~~ (Since 2015, trains terminate in Kuźnica)
- Białystok - Mońki - Grajewo - Ełk
- Hajnówka - Czeremcha - Siemiatycze - Siedlce
- Białystok - Bielsk Podlaski - Czeremcha (Connects to Hajnówka - Siedlce service)
- Białystok - Łapy - Czyżew
- Białystok - Łapy - Śniadowo - Ostrołęka
- Białystok - Łapy - Śniadowo - Łomża (Service starts in 2026)

There are 13 trains a day from Warsaw, the first one leaving at 5.14 and the last one at 20.14. The journey takes about 1 hour and 51 minutes with some nonstop trains doing it in just 1 hour and 30 minutes. 13 of those trains are operated by PKP Intercity and cost zl for the second class and zl 59 (15 euro) for the first-class ticket. Białystok has also direct connections with other cities in Poland such as Gdańsk, Łódź, Kraków and Olsztyn, Białystok also has a twice a day international train to Vilnius.

For timetables and prices, see Polish State Railways.

=== Rail Baltica ===
Rail Baltica is one of the priority projects of the European Union Trans-European Transport Networks (TEN-T). The project is supposed to link Finland, Baltic States and Poland and also improve the connection between central and eastern Europe and Germany. It requires an upgrade of the existing standard gauge railway from Warsaw–Białystok–Ełk- Sokółka -Trakiszki to 200 km/h (120 mph).

== Roads and highways ==
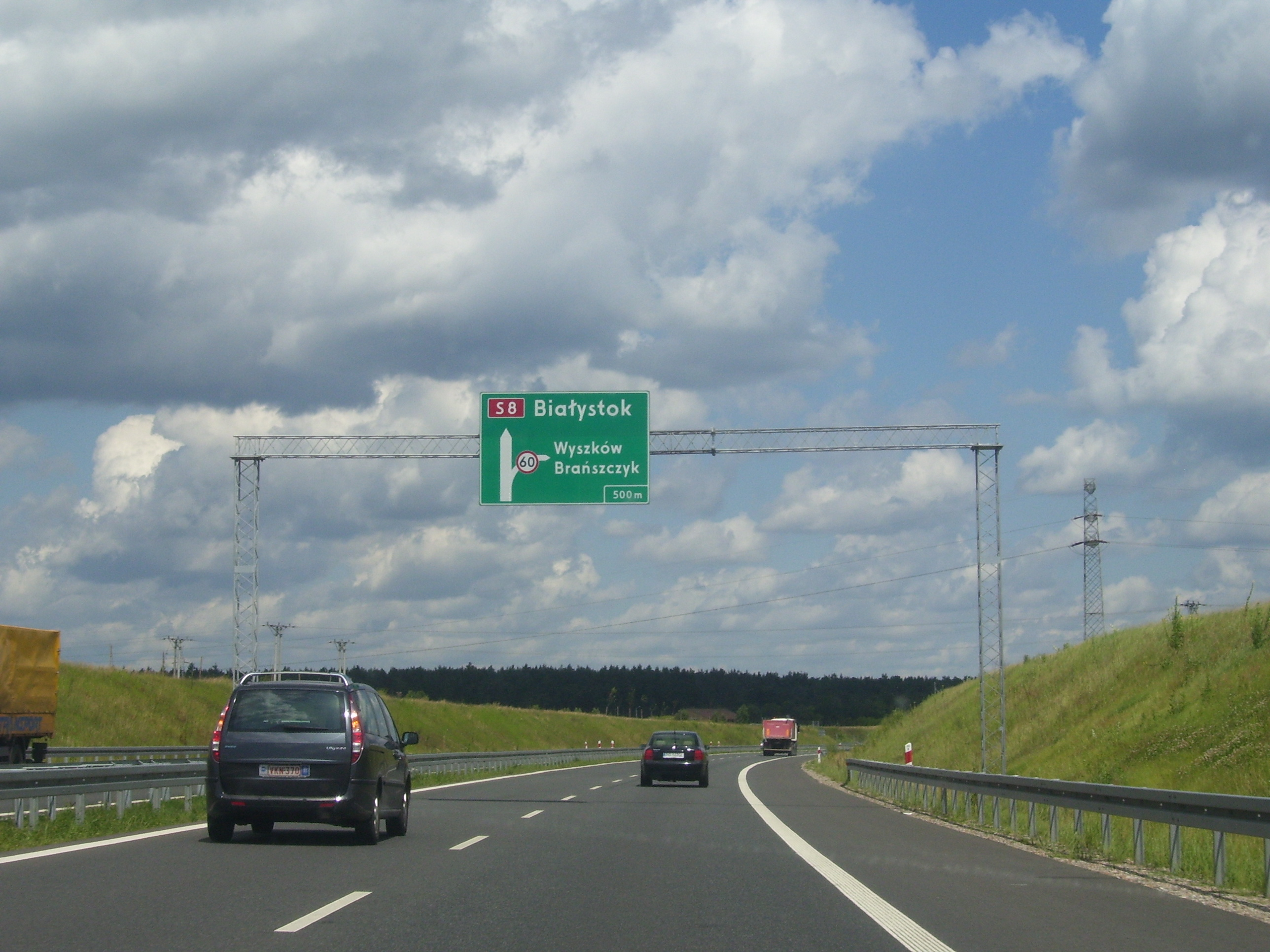

The National Roads (Polish: Droga krajowa) running through Podlaskie:

- S 19 – Połowce (Belarussian–Polish border)-Bielsk Podlaski-Białystok-Kuźnica (Belarussian–Polish border)
- DK 65 – Gołdap (Russian–Polish border)-Ełk-Białystok-Bobrowniki (Belarussian–Polish border)
- S 8 / E67 – Budziska (Polish–Lithuanian border)-Białystok-Warsaw-Wrocław-Kudowa-Zdrój (Czech–Polish border)
- S 16 - Dolna Grupa - Ełk - Augustów - Pomorze - Poćkuny - Ogrodniki - Border crossing
- S 61 - Warsaw - Ostrołęka - Łomża - Grajewo - Augustów

== Public transport ==
Bialystok is the largest city in Poland that has only one form of public transit (bus). There is an extensive bus network that covers the entire city. Tickets can be bought in ticket machines placed in every vehicle, they can be also bought in advance at selected retail points, or the BKM office near Lipowa Street. There are 29 city lines, 13 metropolitan lines and 6 night lines (weekends only) served by 3 bus operators partially owned by the municipality - KPKM, KPK and KZK. Each share approximately a third of the lines and the bus fleet.

== Intercity bus ==
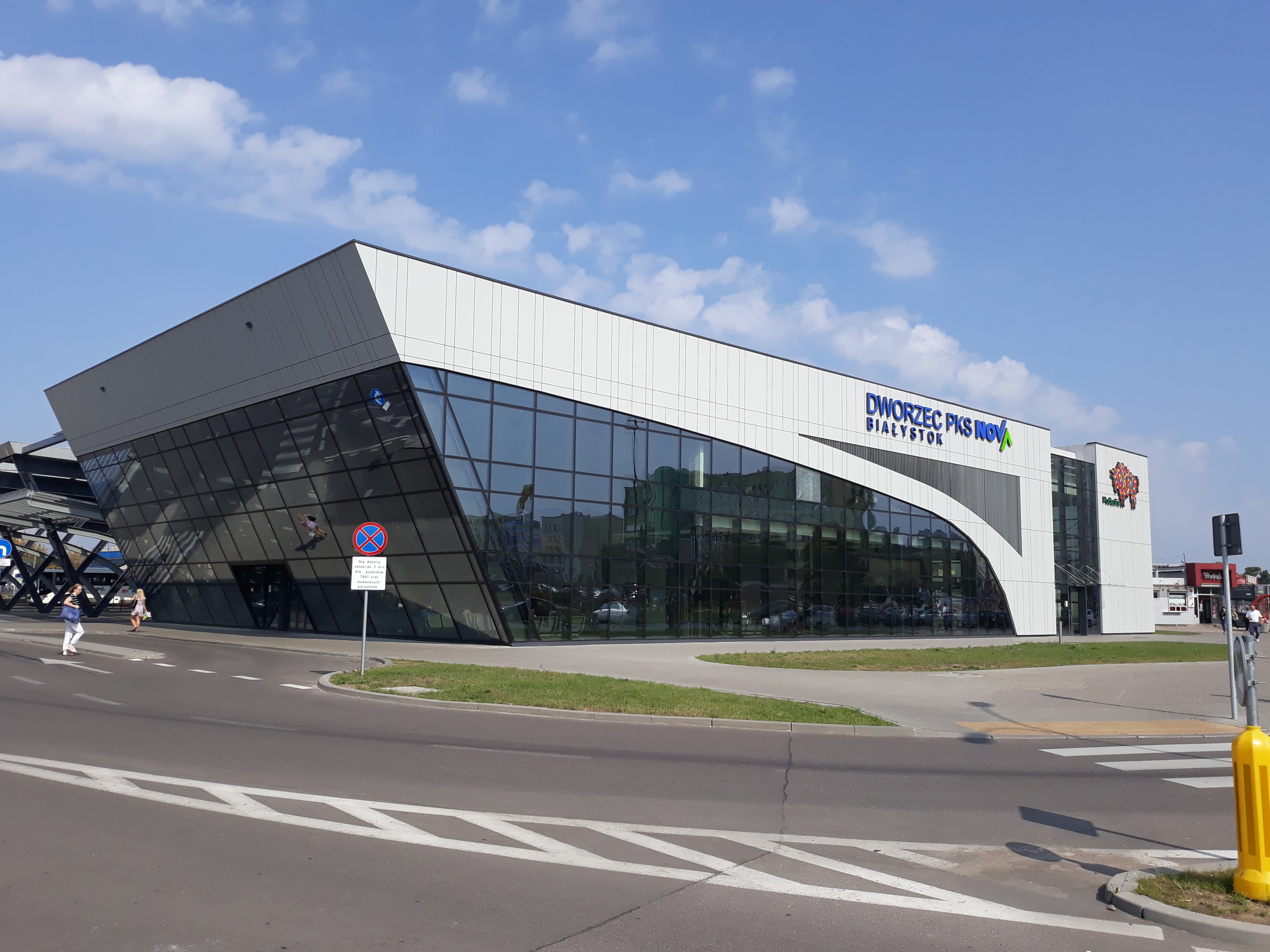
Białystok bus station

PKS Nova operates coaches to most major cities in Poland. Although the coach journey takes much longer than the train and the price is usually more expensive, sometimes the timetables may be more convenient.

== Air transport ==
Currently the nearest airport to Białystok is a regional airport, Hrodna Airport in Hrodna, Belarus. Hrodna only provides domestic service within Belarus. The closest international airport to Białystok is Warsaw Frederic Chopin Airport in Warsaw

Białystok-Krywlany Airport lies within city limits. It is currently used only by Aeroklub Białostocki, a sports and recreational flying association, and by private airplanes.

Construction of a new regional airport, Białystok-Saniki Airport 27 km (17 mi) west-northwest of Białystok in the village of Saniki, Gmina Tykocin, is set to begin in 2012 and completed in 2015. In the first year of operation (2015), according to estimates of the Podlaskie Voidvodeship Marshal's Office, the airport will handle 12,000 passengers growing in 2020 to 145,000 passengers. The airport is proposed to have a runway length of 2,000 m and width of 60 m (45 m + band). It is projected to operate aircraft with a wingspan of up to 52 meters. Construction of the airport is projected to cost five hundred million zloty paid for by a combination of funding from the Podlaskie Voivodeship, the Polish Government and EU infrastructure funding.
