= Wigrańce-Leśniczówka =

- Village
- Location within Poland
- Coordinates: 54°04′01″N 23°28′01″E
- Country: Poland
- Voivodeship: Podlaskie
- County: Sejny
- Gmina: Sejny

Wigrańce-Leśniczówka (Polish pronunciation: [viˈɡraj̃tsɛ lɛɕɲiˈtʂufka]), is a village in the administrative district of Gmina Sejny, within Sejny County, Podlaskie Voivodeship, in north-eastern Poland, close to the border with Lithuania.
