= Rynkojeziory =

- Village
- Location within Poland
- Coordinates: 54°09′02″N 23°31′02″E
- Country: Poland
- Voivodeship: Podlaskie
- County: Sejny
- Gmina: Sejny

Rynkojeziory [rɨŋkɔjɛˈʑɔrɨ] is a village in the administrative district of Gmina Sejny, within Sejny County, Podlaskie Voivodeship, in north-eastern Poland, close to the border with Lithuania.
