= Grudziewszczyzna =

- Village
- Location within Poland
- Coordinates: 54°07′01″N 23°21′01″E
- Country: Poland
- Voivodeship: Podlaskie
- County: Sejny
- Gmina: Sejny
- Population (approx.): 30

Grudziewszczyzna ([ɡrud͡ʑɛfʂˈt͡ʂɨzna]; Lithuanian: Grudzevščizna) is a village in the administrative district of Gmina Sejny, within Sejny County, Podlaskie Voivodeship, in north-eastern Poland, close to the border with Lithuania.
