= Półkoty =

- Village
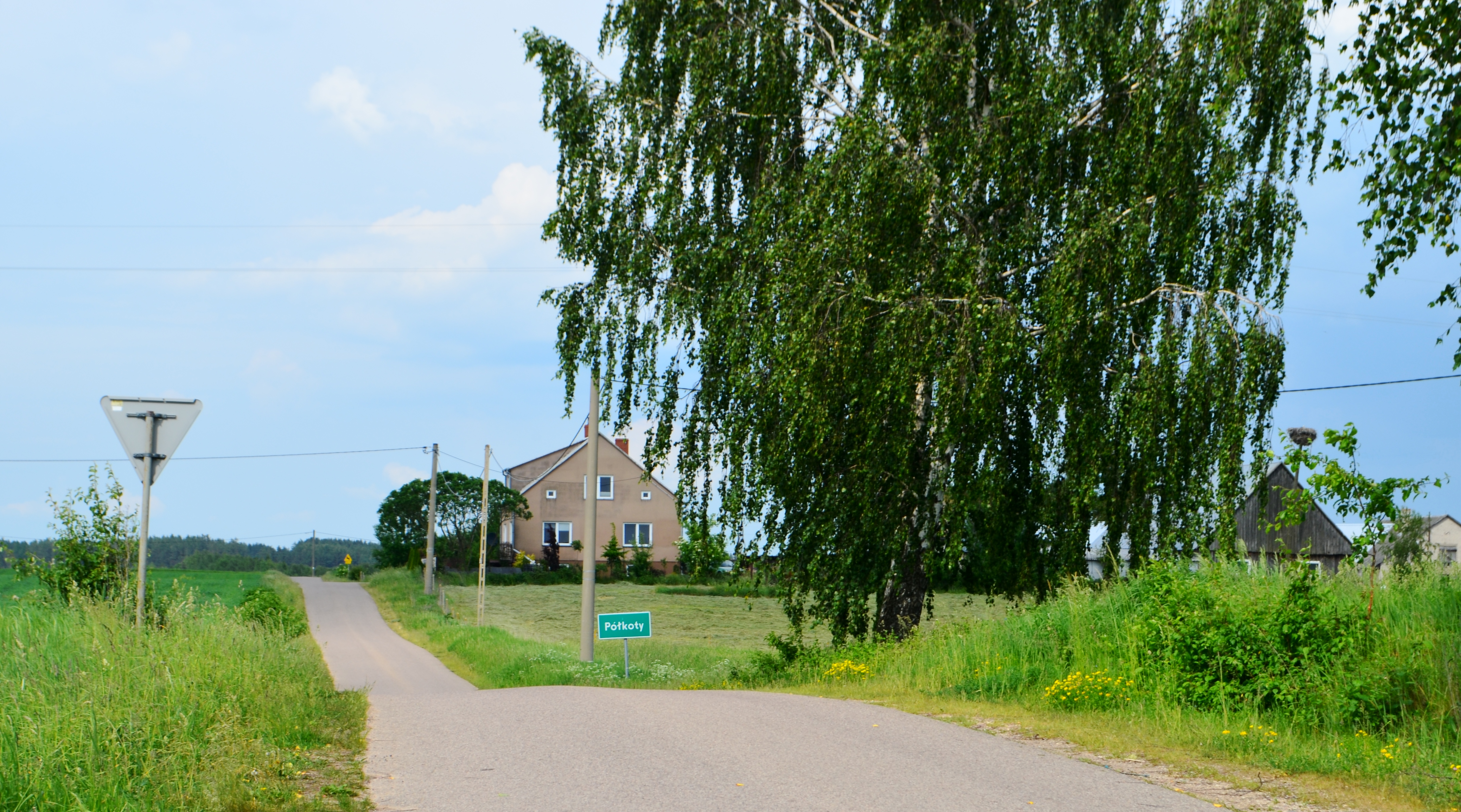

- Location within Poland
- Coordinates: 54°06′01″N 23°22′01″E
- Country: Poland
- Voivodeship: Podlaskie
- County: Sejny
- Gmina: Sejny

Półkoty [puu̯ˈkɔtɨ] is a village in the administrative district of Gmina Sejny, within Sejny County, Podlaskie Voivodeship, in north-eastern Poland, close to the border with Lithuania.
