= Marynowo =

- Village
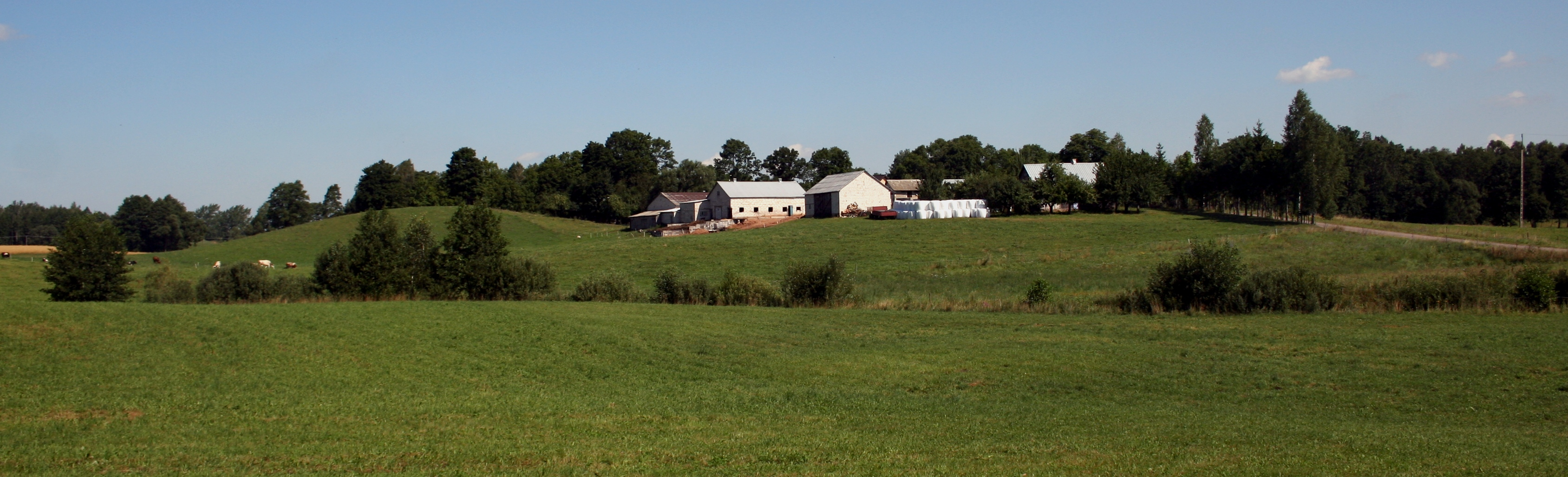

- Location within Poland
- Coordinates: 54°5′46″N 23°18′41″E
- Country: Poland
- Voivodeship: Podlaskie
- County: Sejny
- Gmina: Sejny
- Population: 120

Marynowo [marɨˈnɔvɔ] is a village in the administrative district of Gmina Sejny, within Sejny County, Podlaskie Voivodeship, in north-eastern Poland, close to the border with Lithuania.
