= Marynowo-Kolonia =

- Village
- Location within Poland
- Coordinates: 54°6′6″N 23°18′10″E
- Country: Poland
- Voivodeship: Podlaskie
- County: Sejny
- Gmina: Sejny

Marynowo-Kolonia [marɨˈnɔvɔ kɔˈlɔɲa] is a village in the administrative district of Gmina Sejny, within Sejny County, Podlaskie Voivodeship, in north-eastern Poland, close to the border with Lithuania.
