= Świackie =

- Village
- Location within Poland
- Coordinates: 54°05′01″N 23°18′01″E
- Country: Poland
- Voivodeship: Podlaskie
- County: Sejny
- Gmina: Sejny
- Time zone: UTC+1 (CET)
  - Summer (DST): UTC+2 (CEST)

Świackie (Polish pronunciation: [ˈɕfjat͡skʲɛ]) is a village in the administrative district of Gmina Sejny, within Sejny County, Podlaskie Voivodeship, in north-eastern Poland, close to the border with Lithuania.

== History ==
Three Polish citizens were murdered by Nazi Germany in the village during World War II.
