= Babańce =

- Village
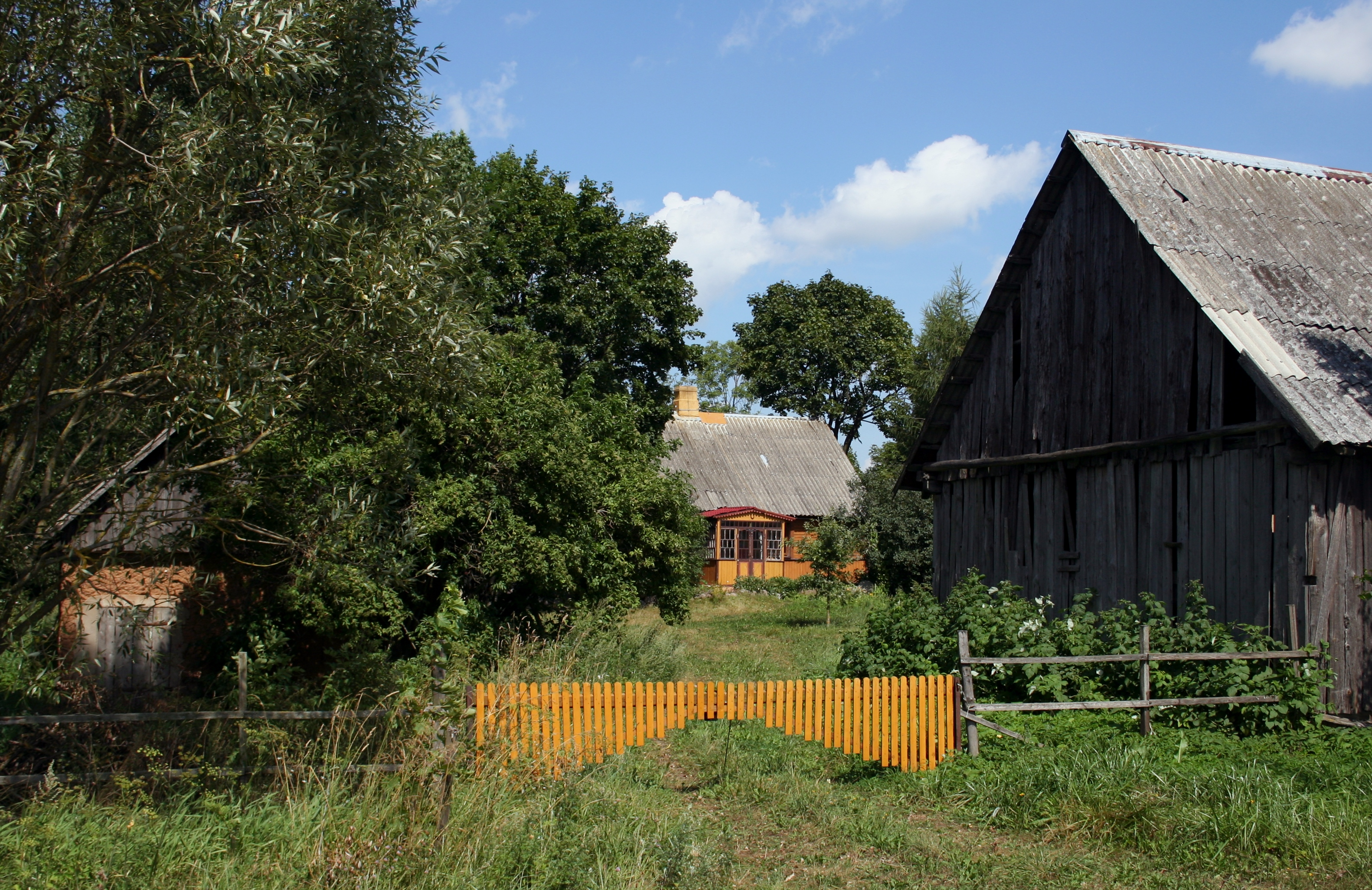

- Location within Poland
- Coordinates: 54°8′N 23°19′E
- Country: Poland
- Voivodeship: Podlaskie
- County: Sejny
- Gmina: Sejny
- Time zone: UTC+1 (CET)
  - Summer (DST): UTC+2 (CEST)
- Vehicle registration: BSE

Babańce ([baˈbaɲt͡sɛ]; Lithuanian: Babonys) is a village in the administrative district of Gmina Sejny, within Sejny County, Podlaskie Voivodeship, in north-eastern Poland, close to the border with Lithuania.

== History ==
From the 13th century to 1795, the village was administratively located in the Trakai Voivodeship of the Grand Duchy of Lithuania and Polish–Lithuanian Commonwealth.

According to the 1921 census, the village had a population of 547, 91.2% Polish by nationality and 94.7% Catholic by confession.

== Sources ==
- VLKK (2002). "Atvirkštinis lietuvių kalboje vartojamų tradicinių Lenkijos vietovardžių formų sąrašas" (PDF). VLKK (in Lithuanian). Archived from the original (PDF) on 2012-02-14.
