= Berżałowce =

- Village
- Location within Poland
- Coordinates: 54°04′35″N 23°26′34″E
- Country: Poland
- Voivodeship: Podlaskie
- County: Sejny
- Gmina: Sejny
- Population: 120

Berżałowce ([bɛrʐaˈwɔft͡sɛ]; Lithuanian: Beržalapiai) is a village in the administrative district of Gmina Sejny, within Sejny County, Podlaskie Voivodeship, in north-eastern Poland, close to the border with Lithuania.

== Sources ==
- VLKK (2002). "Atvirkštinis lietuvių kalboje vartojamų tradicinių Lenkijos vietovardžių formų sąrašas" (PDF). VLKK (in Lithuanian). Archived from the original (PDF) on 2012-02-14.
