= Wigrańce =

- Village
- Location within Poland
- Coordinates: 54°4′N 23°28′E
- Country: Poland
- Voivodeship: Podlaskie
- County: Sejny
- Gmina: Sejny

Wigrańce (Polish pronunciation: [viˈɡraj̃tsɛ]) is a village in the administrative district of Gmina Sejny, within Sejny County, Podlaskie Voivodeship, in north-eastern Poland, close to the border with Lithuania.
