= Hołny Wolmera =

- Village
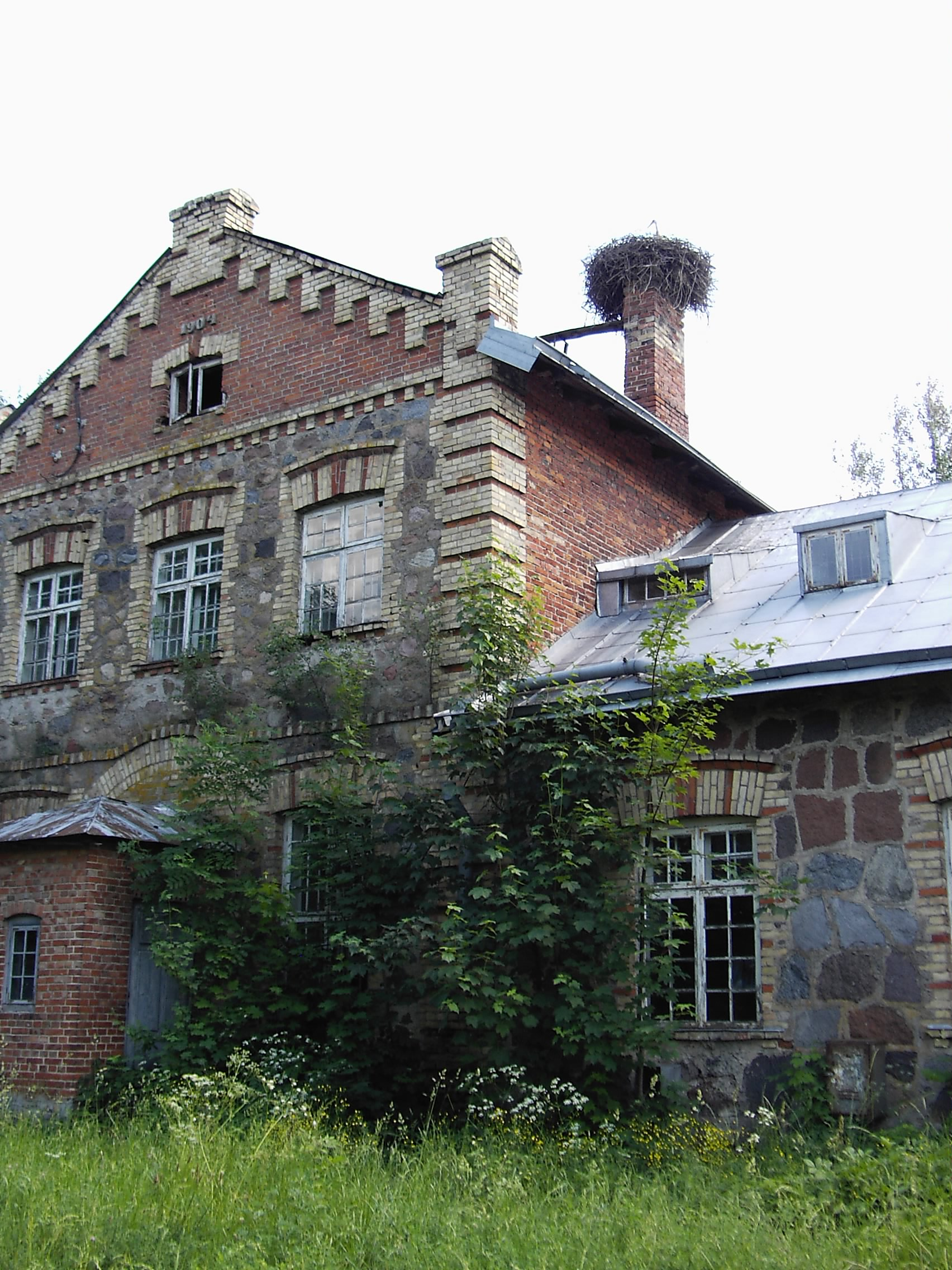

- Location within Poland
- Coordinates: 54°8′N 23°30′E
- Country: Poland
- Voivodeship: Podlaskie
- County: Sejny
- Gmina: Sejny
- Postal code: 16-500
- Vehicle registration: BSE

Hołny Wolmera ([ˈxɔu̯nɨ vɔlˈmɛra]; Lithuanian: Alnai) is a village in the administrative district of Gmina Sejny, within Sejny County, Podlaskie Voivodeship, in north-eastern Poland, close to the border with Lithuania.

Four Polish citizens were murdered by Nazi Germany in the village during World War II.

== Sources ==
- VLKK (2002). "Atvirkštinis lietuvių kalboje vartojamų tradicinių Lenkijos vietovardžių formų sąrašas" (PDF). VLKK (in Lithuanian). Archived from the original (PDF) on 2012-02-14.
