= Posejanka =

- Village
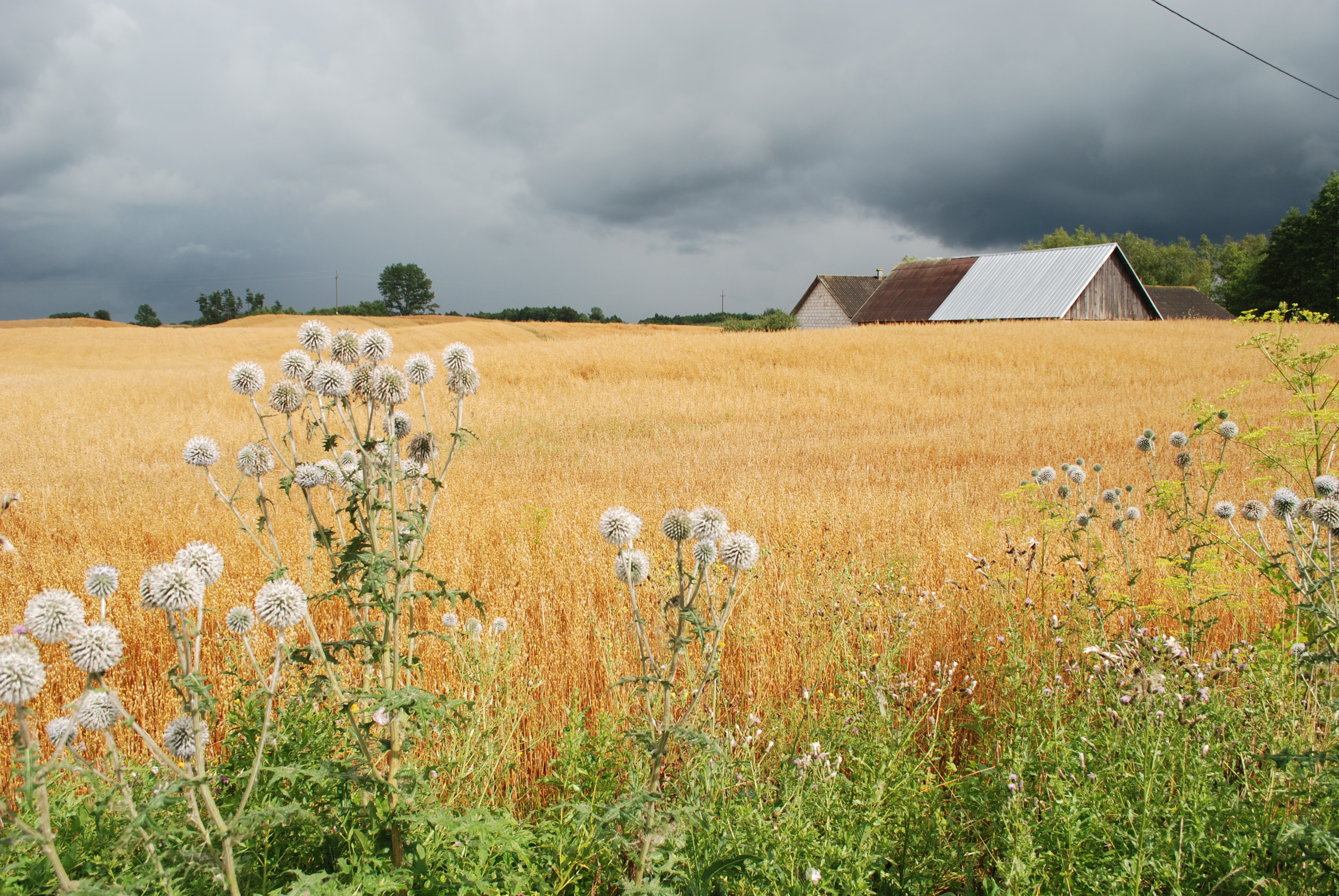

- Location within Poland
- Coordinates: 54°5′N 23°22′E
- Country: Poland
- Voivodeship: Podlaskie
- County: Sejny
- Gmina: Sejny

Posejanka [pɔsɛˈjaŋka], is a village in the administrative district of Gmina Sejny, within Sejny County, Podlaskie Voivodeship, in north-eastern Poland, close to the border with Lithuania.
