= Berżniki-Folwark =

- Village
- Location within Poland
- Coordinates: 54°4′34″N 23°26′33″E
- Country: Poland
- Voivodeship: Podlaskie
- County: Sejny
- Gmina: Sejny

Berżniki-Folwark ([bɛrʐˈniki ˈfɔlvark]; Lithuanian: Berznyko Palivarkas) is a village in the administrative district of Gmina Sejny, within Sejny County, Podlaskie Voivodeship, in north-eastern Poland, close to the border with Lithuania.
