= Nowosady, Sejny County =

Nowosady
- Village
- Location within Poland
- Coordinates: 54°10′N 23°20′E
- Country: Poland
- Voivodeship: Podlaskie
- County: Sejny
- Gmina: Sejny

Nowosady [nɔvɔˈsadɨ] is a village in the administrative district of Gmina Sejny, within Sejny County, Podlaskie Voivodeship, in north-eastern Poland, close to the border with Lithuania.
