= Radziuszki =

- Village
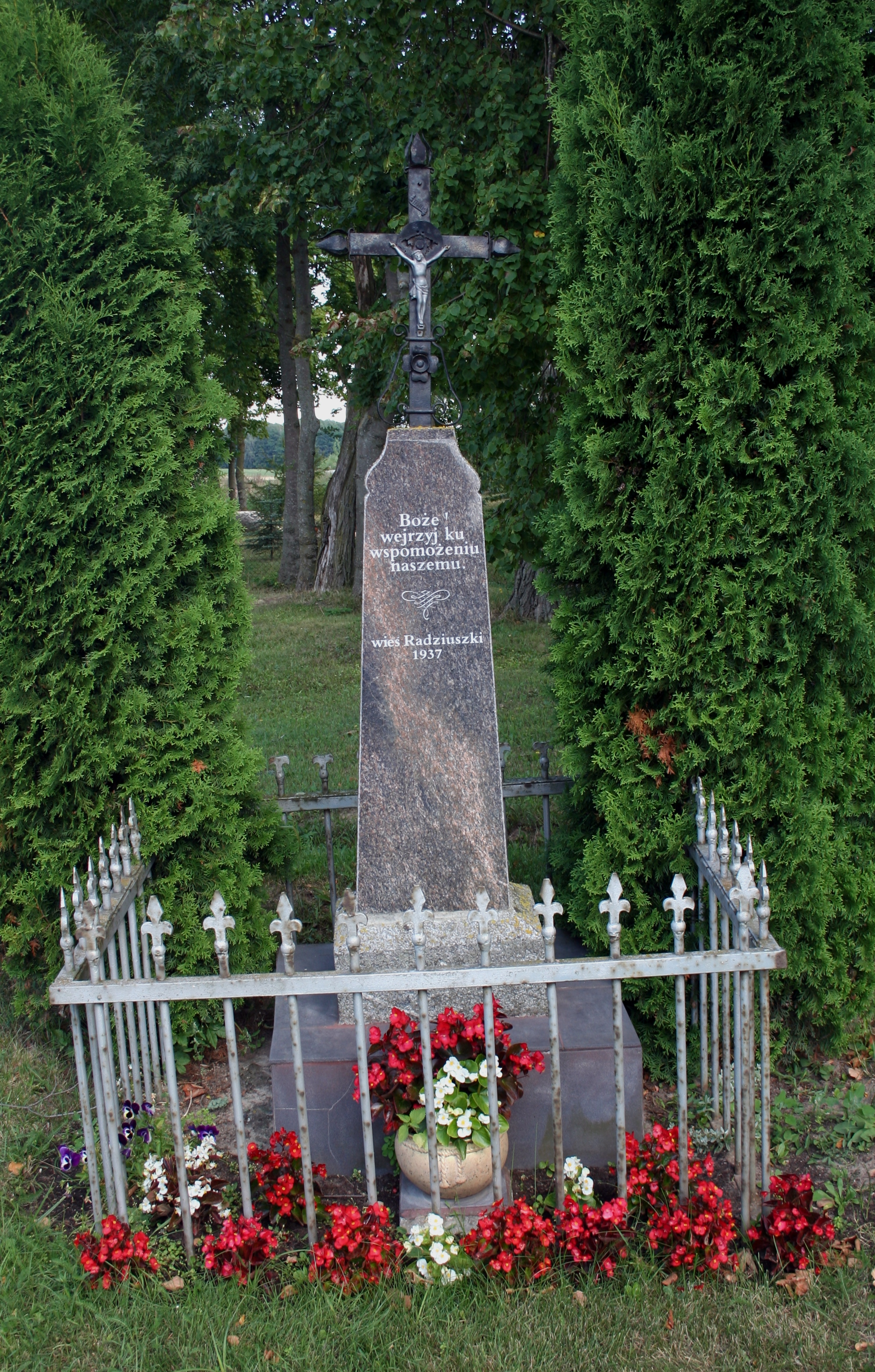

- Location within Poland
- Coordinates: 54°7′N 23°19′E
- Country: Poland
- Voivodeship: Podlaskie
- County: Sejny
- Gmina: Sejny

Radziuszki (Polish pronunciation: [raˈd͡ʑuʂki]) is a village in the administrative district of Gmina Sejny, within Sejny County, Podlaskie Voivodeship, in north-eastern Poland, close to the border with Lithuania.
