= Degucie, Podlaskie Voivodeship =

Degucie
- Village
- Location within Poland
- Coordinates: 54°5′N 23°23′E
- Country: Poland
- Voivodeship: Podlaskie
- County: Sejny
- Gmina: Sejny
- Time zone: UTC+1 (CET)
  - Summer (DST): UTC+2 (CEST)
- Postal code: 16-500
- Vehicle registration: BSE

Degucie ([dɛˈɡut͡ɕɛ] Lithuanian: Degučiai) is a village in the administrative district of Gmina Sejny, within Sejny County, Podlaskie Voivodeship, in north-eastern Poland, close to the border with Lithuania.

According to the 1921 census, the village had a population of 66, entirely Polish by nationality.

== Sources ==
- Valstybinė lietuvių kalbos komisija (2002). "Atvirkštinis lietuvių kalboje vartojamų tradicinių Lenkijos vietovardžių formų sąrašas" (PDF). VLKK (in Lithuanian). Archived from the original (PDF) on 2012-02-14.
