= Żegary =

- Village
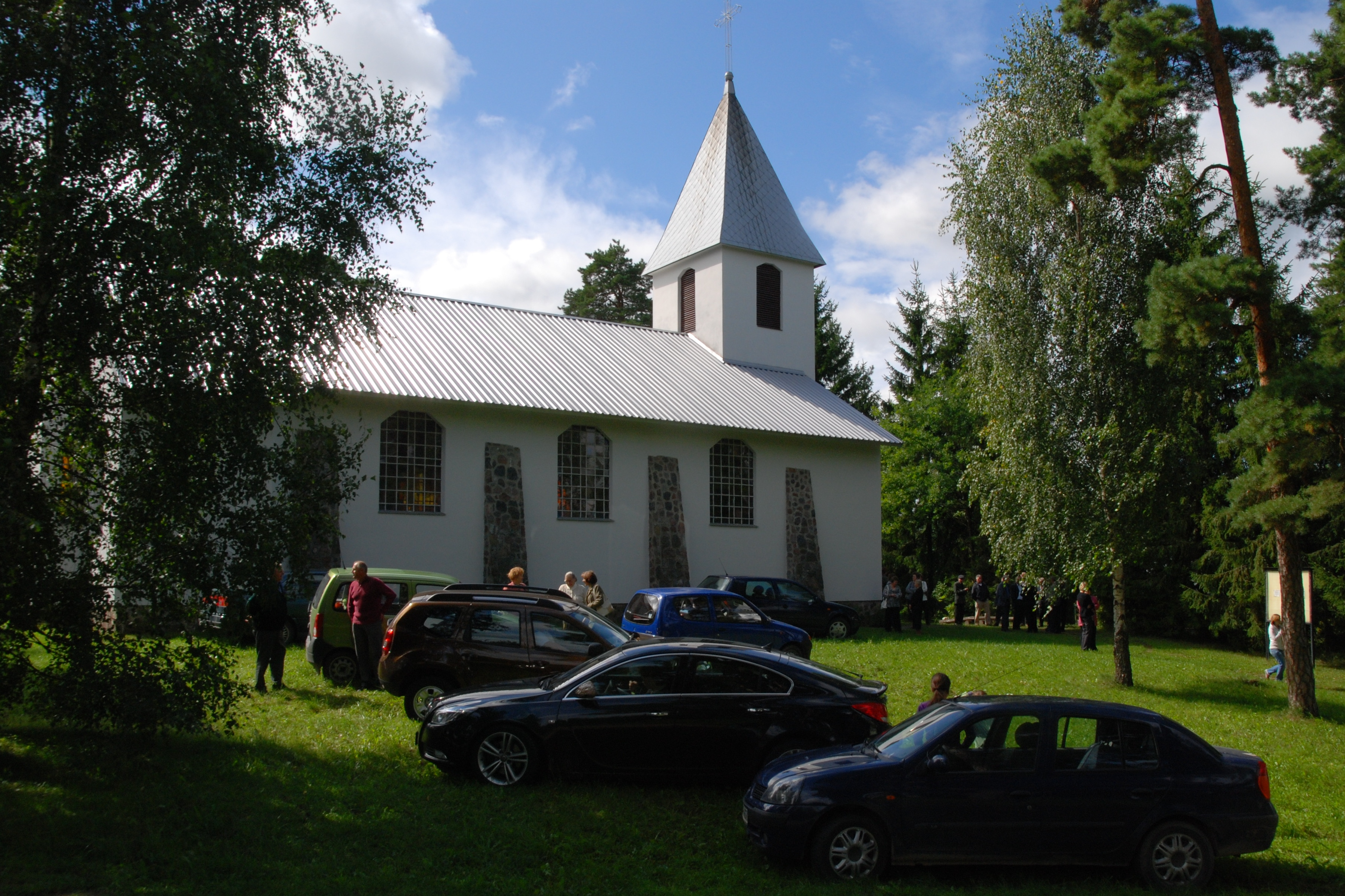
- Church in Żegary

- Location within Poland
- Coordinates: 54°8′10″N 23°24′42″E
- Country: Poland
- Voivodeship: Podlaskie
- County: Sejny
- Gmina: Sejny

Żegary ([ʐɛˈɡarɨ]; Lithuanian: Žagariai) is a village in the administrative district of Gmina Sejny, within Sejny County, Podlaskie Voivodeship, in north-eastern Poland, close to the border with Lithuania.
