= Berżałowce-Gajówka =

- Village
- Location within Poland
- Coordinates: 54°3′53″N 23°25′5″E
- Country: Poland
- Voivodeship: Podlaskie
- County: Sejny
- Gmina: Sejny

Berżałowce-Gajówka ([bɛrʐaˈwɔft͡sɛ ɡaˈjufka]; Lithuanian: Beržalapių Gajuvka) is a village in the administrative district of Gmina Sejny, within Sejny County, Podlaskie Voivodeship, in north-eastern Poland, close to the border with Lithuania.
