= Hołny Mejera =

- Village
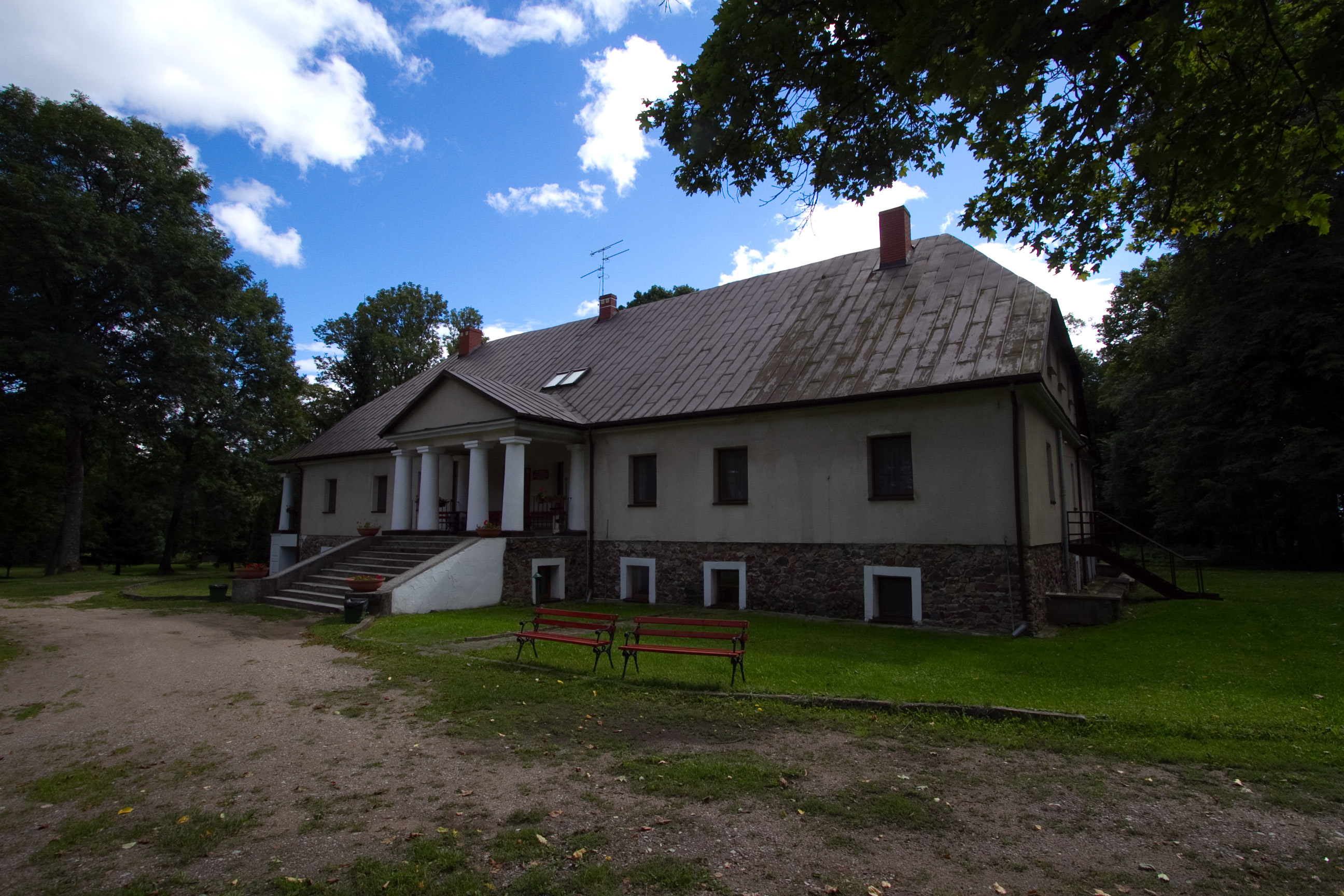

- Location within Poland
- Coordinates: 54°09′03″N 23°28′07″E
- Country: Poland
- Voivodeship: Podlaskie
- County: Sejny
- Gmina: Sejny
- Population: 73

Hołny Mejera ([ˈxɔu̯nɨ maˈjɛra]; Lithuanian: Alnukai) is a village in the administrative district of Gmina Sejny, within Sejny County, Podlaskie Voivodeship, in north-eastern Poland, close to the border with Lithuania.

== Sources ==
- VLKK (2002). "Atvirkštinis lietuvių kalboje vartojamų tradicinių Lenkijos vietovardžių formų sąrašas" (PDF). VLKK (in Lithuanian). Archived from the original (PDF) on 2012-02-14.
