= Krasnogruda =

- Village
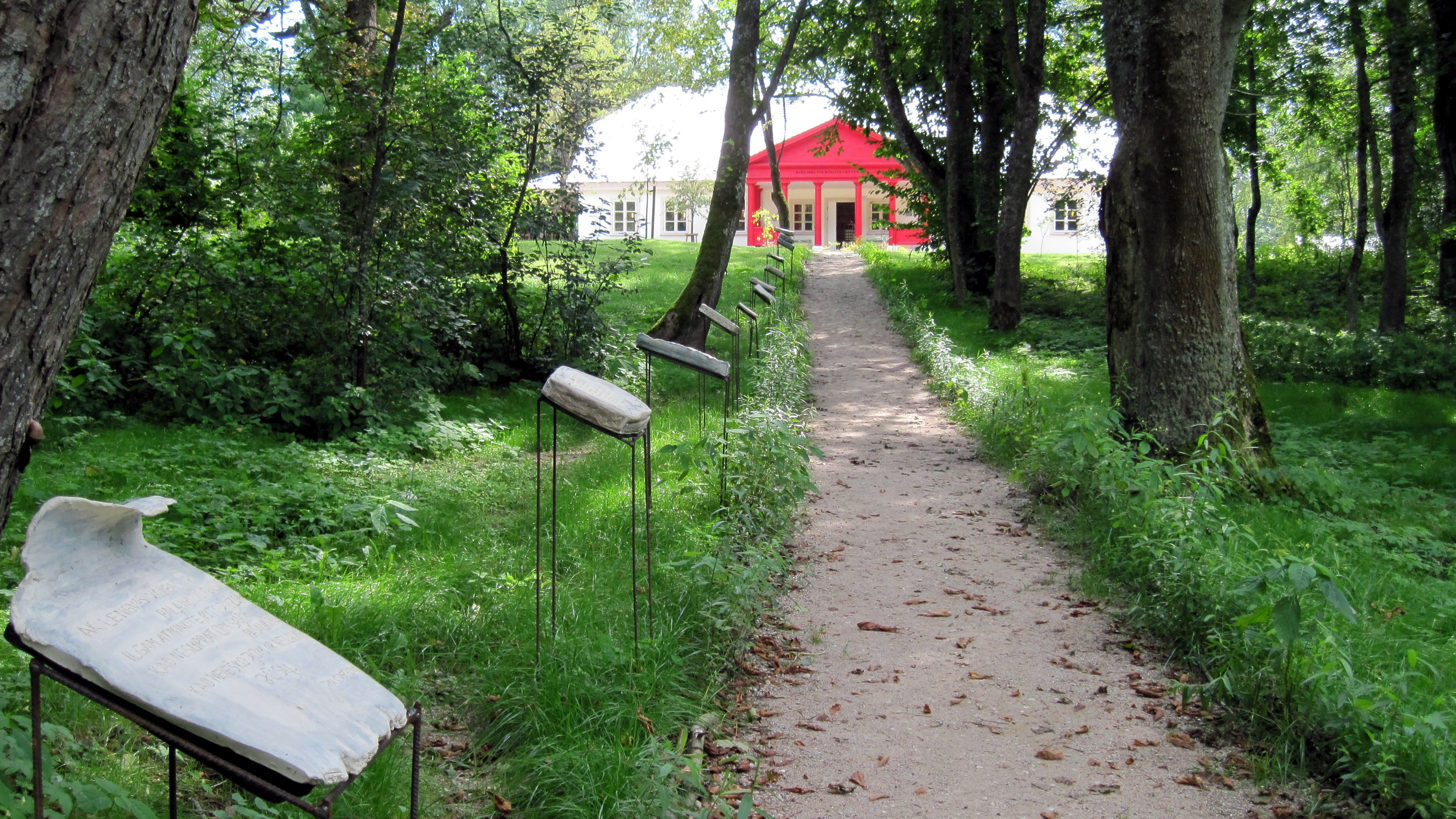
- Park in Krasnogruda
- Interactive map of Krasnogruda
- Location within Poland
- Coordinates: 54°09′11″N 23°25′31″E
- Country: Poland
- Voivodeship: Podlaskie
- County: Sejny
- Gmina: Sejny

Krasnogruda [krasnɔˈɡruda] is a village in the administrative district of Gmina Sejny, within Sejny County, Podlaskie Voivodeship, in north-eastern Poland, close to the border with Lithuania.

== History ==
The first mention of the Krasnogruda manor and estate (the original name was Krasnyhrud) dates back to 1676. The early history of the estate is not exactly known, more is known since 1785, when the Krasnogruda estate (consisting of the Krasnogruda farm and the villages of Żegary, Gawieniańce and Bierżyn) was purchased by the Eysymonts. Their first owner in the family was Maciej Tadeusz Eysymont, incl. founder of the church in Żegary.

At the end of the 19th century, the estate had 4 houses and 38 residents. The Krasnogruda estate consisted of the farms Krasnogruda and Wereszczeńszczyzna. It covered 1,815 morgens.

In 1929, the estate covered 414 acres. The owner was Bronisław Kunat (according to other sources it was named Kunatte).

The history of the manor and land ownership in the period from the end of the 18th century to the Second World War is closely related to the landed gentry families of Eysymont and Kunatów. The first owner of Krasnogruda from the Kunat family, from which Czesław Miłosz's mother Weronika came, was Teofil, followed by his son Bronisław Kunat. In the interwar period, the last heirs of Krasnogruda, sisters Gabriel Lipska née Kunat (1888–1962) and Janina Niementowska née Kunat (1898–1977) ran a holiday guesthouse at the manor. During the Second World War the property was taken over by the German authorities. After the war, as a result of the decree of the Polish Committee of National Liberation of September 6, 1944, on the land reform, the manor and land (then with an area of 344.5 ha) ceased to be private property, and the owners were forced to leave it. The non-parceled part, ie 154.5 ha, was taken over by the state. After the war, the user of Krasnogruda was first Aleksander Czyrowski, and then the District Board of State Forests, the Pomorze Forest District. The families of forest inspectorates lived in the manor. By the will of Czesław and Andrzej Miłosz and Janina and Andrzej Jurewicz - the last heirs of Krasnogruda, the Krasnogruda manor and the park were in 2002 taken over by the "Pogranicze" Foundation, which after revitalization is the seat of the International Center for Dialogue.
