= Gmina Sejny =

Gmina Sejny Sejny Commune
- Gmina
- Flag Coat of arms

- Gmina Sejny within the Sejny County
- Coordinates (Sejny): 54°7′N 23°22′E
- Country: Poland
- Voivodeship: Podlaskie
- County: Sejny
- Seat: Sejny

Area
  - Total: 218.01 km^{2} (84.17 sq mi)

Population (2011)
  - Total: 4,156
  - Density: 19.06/km^{2} (49.37/sq mi)

Gmina Sejny, is a rural gmina (administrative district) in Sejny County, Podlaskie Voivodeship, in north-eastern Poland, on the Lithuanian border. Its seat is the town of Sejny, although the town is not part of the territory of the gmina.

The gmina covers an area of 218.01 square kilometres (84.2 sq mi). As of 2011 its total population was 4,156 and 15.5% of the inhabitants were Lithuanians.

== Villages ==
Gmina Sejny contains the villages and settlements of Babańce, Berżałowce, Berżałowce-Gajówka, Berżniki, Berżniki-Folwark, Bose, Bubele, Burbiszki, Degucie, Dubowo, Dusznica, Dworczysko, Gawieniańce, Grudziewszczyzna, Gryszkańce, Hołny Majera, Hołny Wolmera, Jenorajście, Jodeliszki, Kielczany, Klejwy, Klejwy PGR, Kolonia, Kolonia Sejny, Konstantynówka, Krasnogruda, Krasnowo, Krejwińce, Lasanka, Łumbie, Markiszki, Marynowo, Marynowo-Kolonia, Nowosady, Nożegary, Ogrodniki, Olszanka, Poćkuny, Podlaski, Półkoty, Posejanka, Posejny, Rachelany, Radziucie, Radziuszki, Rynkojeziory, Sumowo, Świackie, Sztabinki, Wigrańce, Wigrańce-Leśniczówka, Zaleskie, Zaruby and Żegary.

== Neighbouring gminas ==
Gmina Sejny is bordered by the town of Sejny and by the gminas of Giby, Krasnopol and Puńsk. It also borders Lithuania.
