= Pieralom =

Village in Grodno Region, Belarus

Pieralom Пералом
- Village
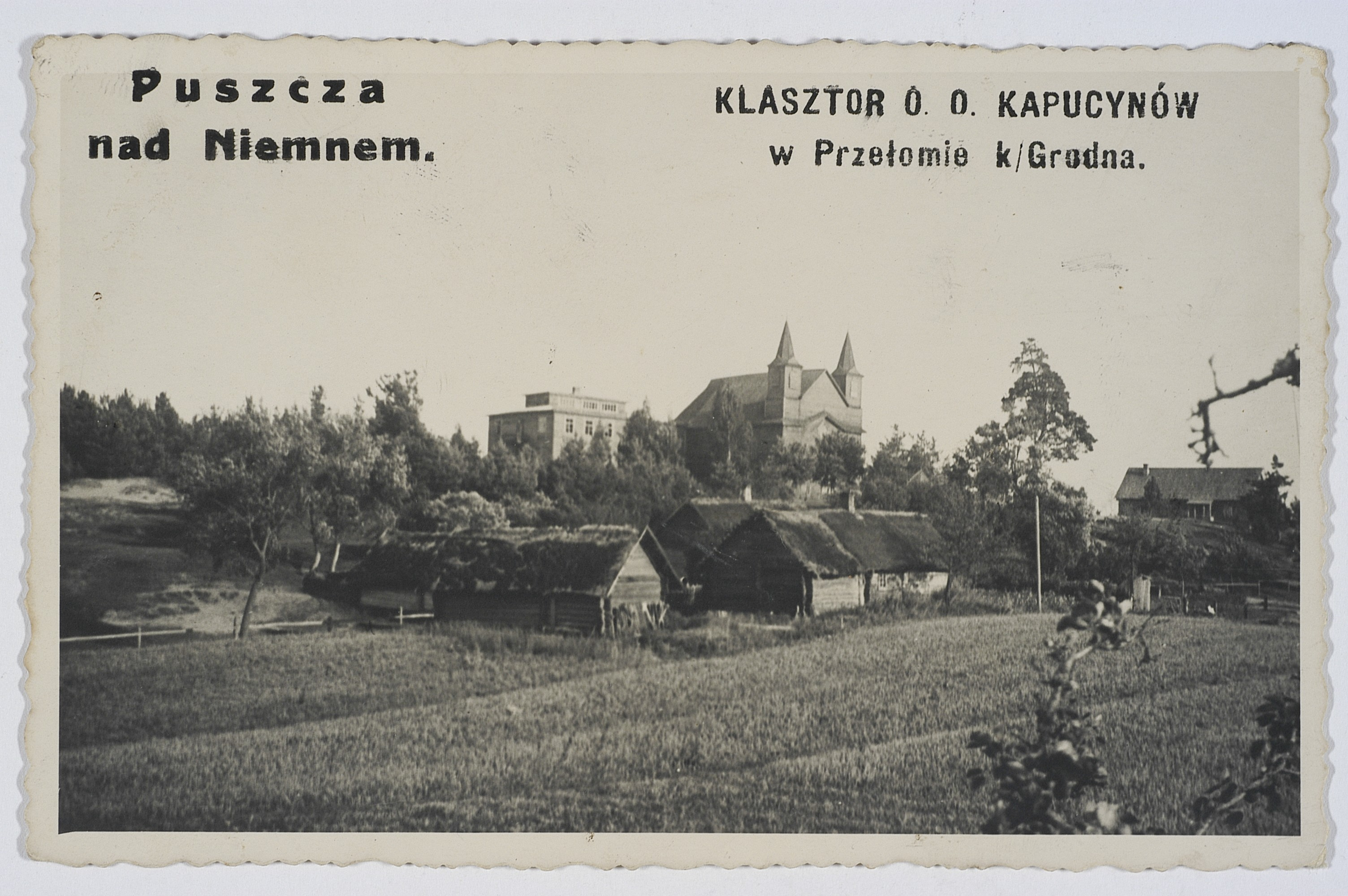
- General view in c. 1920

- Location within Belarus
- Coordinates: 53°53′40″N 23°46′54″E
- Country: Belarus
- Region: Grodno Region
- District: Grodno District
- Time zone: UTC+3 (MSK)

Pieralom (Belarusian: Пералом, Polish: Przełom) is a village in Grodno District, Grodno Region, in western Belarus. It is situated on the Neman River.

== History ==
In the 14th century, there was a Lithuanian defensive castle in the village, and a battle was fought there between Lithuanians and Teutonic Knights in 1378. Within the Polish–Lithuanian Commonwealth, the village was administratively located in the Grodno County in the Troki Voivodeship.

In the interwar period, Przełom, as it was known in Polish, was administratively located in the Grodno County in the Białystok Voivodeship of Poland. According to the 1921 census, the village with the adjacent zaścianek and manor farm had a population of 181, entirely Polish by nationality, and Catholic by confession.

Following the invasion of Poland in September 1939, the village was first occupied by the Soviet Union until 1941, then by Nazi Germany until 1944, and then re-occupied by the Soviet Union, which eventually annexed it from Poland in 1945.
