= Sejny County =

Sejny County Powiat sejneński
- County
- Flag Coat of arms

- Location within the voivodeship
- Coordinates (Sejny): 54°7′N 23°22′E
- Country: Poland
- Voivodeship: Podlaskie
- Seat: Sejny
- Gminas: Total 5 (incl. 1 urban): Sejny; Gmina Giby; Gmina Krasnopol; Gmina Puńsk; Gmina Sejny

Area
  - Total: 856.07 km^{2} (330.53 sq mi)

Population (2019)
  - Total: 20,002
  - Density: 23.365/km^{2} (60.515/sq mi)
  - Urban: 5,286
  - Rural: 14,716
- Car plates: BSE
- Website: www.powiat.sejny.pl

Sejny County (Polish: powiat sejneński) a county in Podlaskie Voivodeship, in the extreme north-east of Poland, on the border with Lithuania and Belarus. It came into being on January 1, 1999, as a result of the Polish local government reforms passed in 1998. Its administrative seat and only town is Sejny, which lies 112 kilometres (70 mi) north of the regional capital Białystok.

The county covers an area of 856.07 square kilometres (330.5 sq mi). As of 2019 its total population was 20,002, with Lithuanians comprising 20.2% (4,271) of the inhabitants.

== Neighbouring counties ==
Sejny County is bordered by Augustów County to the south and Suwałki County to the west. It also borders Lithuania to the north-east and Belarus to the east.

== Administrative divisions ==
The county is subdivided into five gminas (one urban and four rural). These are listed in the following table, in descending order of population.

Gmina	Type	Area (km^{2})	Population (2019)	Seat
Sejny	urban	4.5	5,286	
Gmina Puńsk	rural	138.4	4,164	Puńsk
Gmina Sejny	rural	218.0	4,028	Sejny *
Gmina Krasnopol	rural	171.6	3,810	Krasnopol
Gmina Giby	rural	323.6	2,714	Giby
* seat not part of the gmina
