= Sosnowo, Gmina Sztabin =

Sosnowo
- Village
- Location within Poland
- Coordinates: 53°43′14″N 22°59′32″E
- Country: Poland
- Voivodeship: Podlaskie
- County: Augustów
- Gmina: Sztabin

Sosnowo [sɔsˈnɔvɔ] is a village in the administrative district of Gmina Sztabin, within Augustów County, Podlaskie Voivodeship, in north-eastern Poland.

== Augustów Canal ==
The Sosnowo Lock is the second lock on the Augustów Canal (from the Biebrza).
