= Windawski Canal =

Canal in Lithuania

Coordinates: 55°47′40″N 23°08′20″E

Ventos-Dubysos kanalas Russian: Виндавский канал
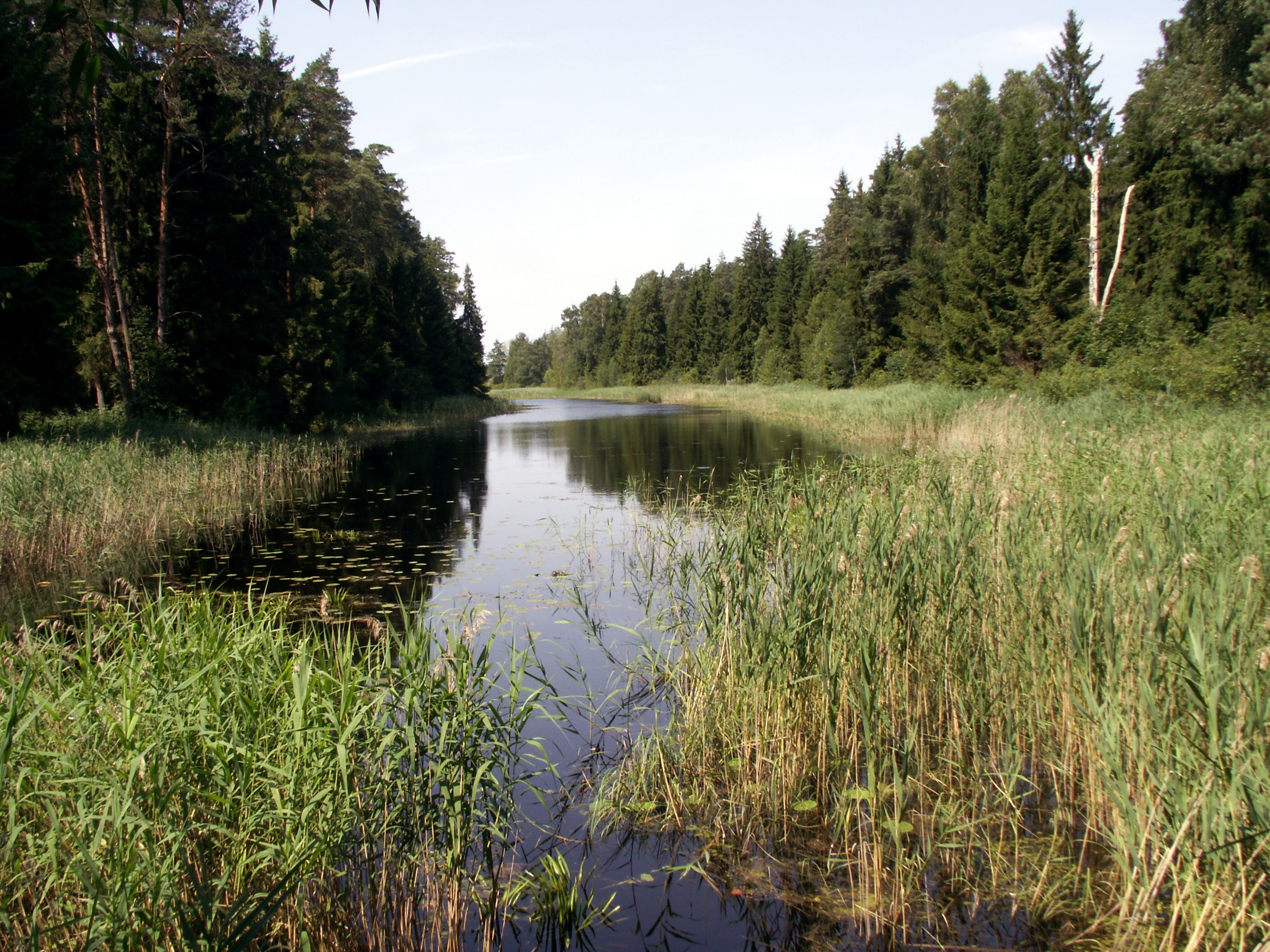
- Windawski Canal in Kurtuvėnai regional park, near Žadvainiais, Šiauliai district, Lithuania
- Interactive map of Ventos-Dubysos kanalas Russian: Виндавский канал

Specifications
- Locks: 20
- Status: Abandoned

History
- Construction began: 1825
- Date completed: n/a
- Date closed: 1831

Geography
- Start point: Dubysa River near Bazilionai, Lithuania
- End point: Venta River near Tolučiai Šaukėnų, Lithuania

Ventos-Dubysos kanalas (Lithuanian: Ventos–Dubysos kanalas; Russian: Виндавский канал, Vindavsky channel) is an abandoned canal connecting the Dubysa River near Bazilionai, Šiauliai district to the Venta River near Tolučiai Šaukėnų, Kelmė District of Lithuania.

The canal was designed and built in the early 19th century as part of canal system to connect the Vistula River at the center of the Kingdom of Poland with the Baltic seaport of Ventspils. The first section (the Augustów Canal) was completed, but work was halted on the Windawski Canal due to the unrest caused by the Uprising of 1831 against Russia.

== History ==
=== Design and construction (1821–1831) ===
In 1821 Prussia introduced repressively high customs duties for transit of Polish and Lithuanian goods through its territory, practically blocking the access to the sea for Polish traders operating outside of Prussian territory. The idea of Polish Minister of Economy, Franciszek Ksawery Drucki-Lubecki, was to make the new trade route independent of the Prussian seaports of Danzig (Gdańsk) on the Vistula River and Memel (Klaipėda) on the Neman River, and link the center of the Kingdom of Poland with the Baltic seaport of Ventspils (Polish: Windawa).

The canal was designed and built in two sections, the first being the Augustów Canal, located in then the Augustów Voivodeship of the Kingdom of Poland, providing a direct link between the Vistula River, through the Biebrza River – a tributary of the Narew River, and the Neman River, through its tributary – the Czarna Hancza River. The final "Windawski" section of the waterway (Windawski Canal), which was to connect the Neman River, through its tributary – the Dubysa River, with the Venta River located in the Kovno Governorate of the Russian Empire. The canal was based on the Kartuva rivulet.

In 1822 Duke Alexander of Württemberg became the Head of Communications Department and commenced several river channel projects in western Russia.

Stanisław Kierbedź, a noted bridge engineer, built a bridge across the canal in 1830.

=== Interruption and decline (1831–1920) ===
Work on the canal was interrupted by unrest caused by the Uprising of 1831 against Russia and trade agreements with Prussia.

A battle occurred during World War I along the banks of the canal.

=== Rebirth and abandonment (1920 – present) ===
The work resumed only at the beginning of the 20th century but was interrupted again by World War I. After the war there was no purpose for the canal as Lithuania gained control over the Klaipėda Region and lower reaches of Neman River.

On 19 April 2005, the Canal was listed as engineering monument S1073 on the Republic of Lithuania's cultural heritage register.

== Canal infrastructure ==
The canal is 15 km in length and was designed to have 20 locks.
