= Białobrzegi Lock =

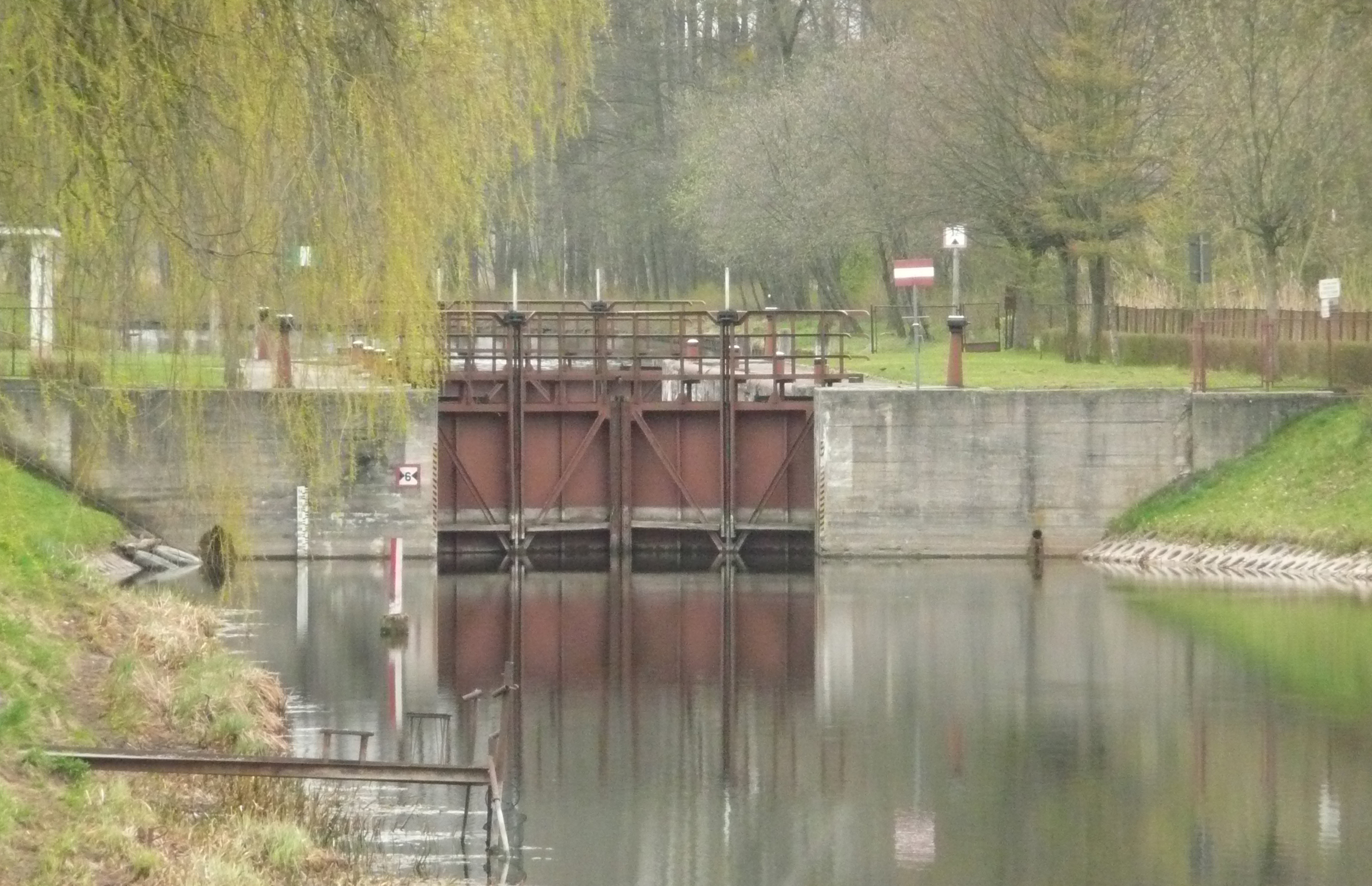
- Lock
- 53.806976°N 22.968698°E
- Waterway: Augustów Canal
- Country: Poland
- State: Podlaskie
- County: Augustów
- Maintained by: RZGW
- Operation: Manual
- First built: 1825 - 1826
- Latest built: rebuilt 1959 - 1964
- Length: 42.8 m (140.4 ft)
- Width: 5.9 m (19.4 ft)
- Fall: 2.08 m (6.8 ft)
- Distance to Biebrza River: 27.10 km (16.8 mi)
- Distance to Niemen River: 74.10 km (46.0 mi)

Białobrzegi Lock - the fourth lock on the Augustów Canal (from the Biebrza River). Located in the village of Białobrzegi in the administrative district of Gmina Augustów, within Augustów County, Podlaskie Voivodeship, in north-eastern Poland. It lies approximately 6 kilometres (4 mi) south of Augustów and 78 km (48 mi) north of the regional capital Białystok. In the years 1959 - 1964 was demolished and built, using original art, a new 150 meters on the other side of the road Augustów – Białystok. The reason for this change were to be the cause of the military.

- Location: 26.9 km channel
- Level difference: 2.08 m
- Length: 42.8 m
- Width: 5.90 m
- Gates: Metal
- Year built: 1825 - 1826, rebuilt 1959 - 1964
- Construction Manager: Eng. Wojciech Korczakowski

Next lock upstream	Augustów Canal; Navigation	Next lock downstream
Augustów Lock; 5.4 km (3.4 mi)	Białobrzegi Lock	Borki Lock; 7.85 km (4.9 mi)
