= Valkushyk Lock =

- Waterway: Augustów Canal
- Country: Belarus
- State: Hrodna Voblast
- County: Hrodna District
- Operation: Manual
- First built: 1829
- Latest built: rebuilt 2005-2006
- Length: 44.00 m (144.4 ft)
- Width: 5.90 m (19.4 ft)
- Fall: 4.33 m (14.2 ft)
- Distance to Biebrza River: 85.00 km (52.8 mi)
- Distance to Niemen River: 16.2 km (10.1 mi)

Valkushyk Lock (Belarusian: Шлюз «Валкушык»), Wołkuszek Lock (Polish: Śluza Wołkuszek) is the sixteenth lock on the Augustów Canal (starting from the Biebrza). It was built in 1829 by Wojciech Korczakowski in the Wołkuszanki estuary. It is the first of three locks situated on Belarusian territory (at a distance of 1600 meters from the Polish border). In 2005–2006 it was rebuilt by the Belarusian government.

- Location: 85.00 km channel
- Level difference: 4.33 m
- Length: 44.00 m
- Width: 5.90 m
- Gates: Wooden
- Year built: 1829
- Construction Manager: Wojciech Korczakowski

Next lock upstream	Augustów Canal; Navigation	Next lock downstream
Dąbrówka Lock; 6.5 km (4.0 mi)	Valkushyk Lock	Kurzyniec Lock; 3.25 km (2.0 mi)
