= Sosnowo Lock =

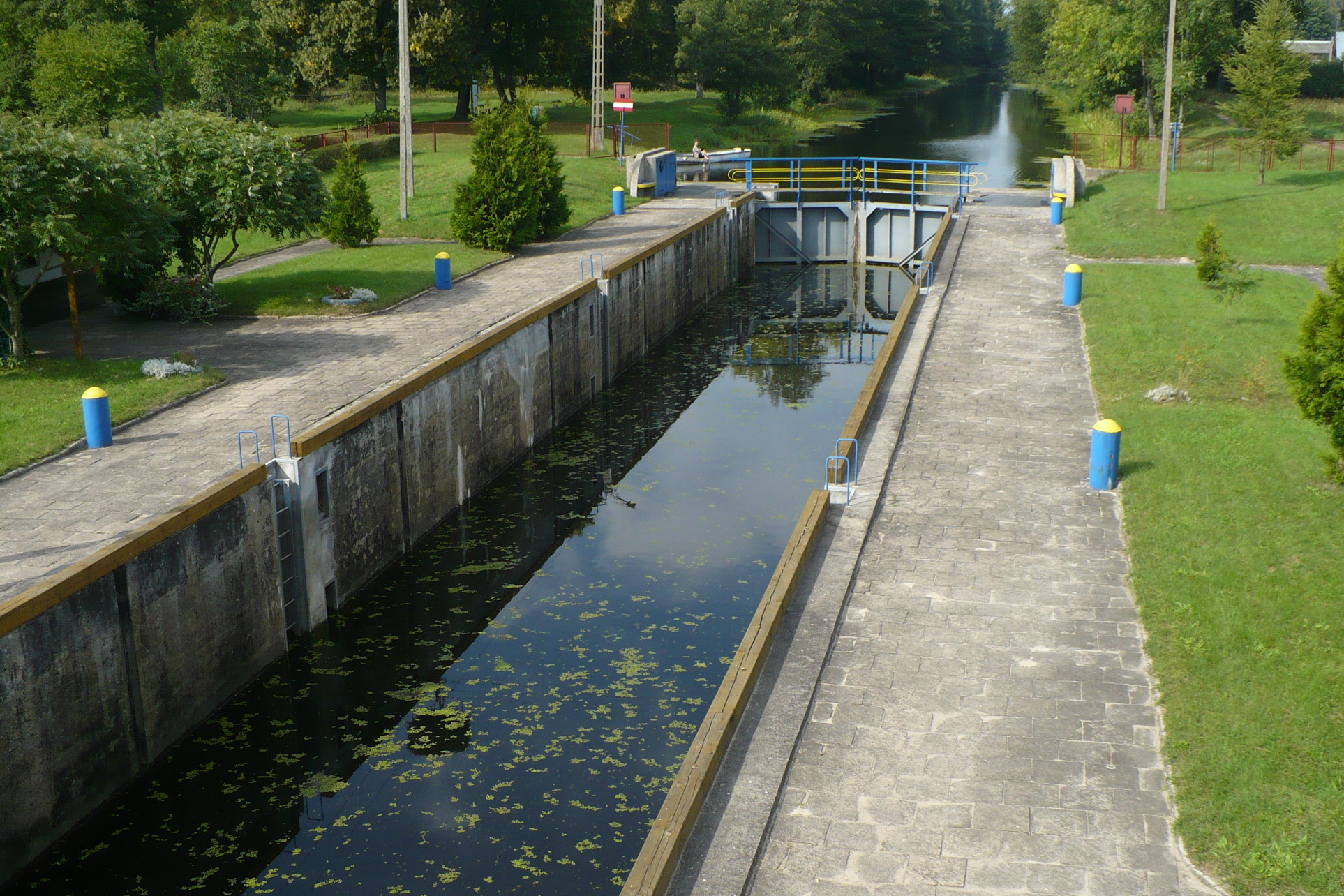
- Lock
- 53.700272°N 22.926201°E
- Waterway: Augustów Canal
- Country: Poland
- State: Podlaskie
- County: Augustów
- Maintained by: RZGW
- Operation: Manual
- First built: 1835-1836
- Latest built: rebuilt 1948
- Length: 43.5 m (142.7 ft)
- Width: 6.1 m (20.0 ft)
- Fall: 2.77 m (9.1 ft)
- Distance to Biebrza River: 13.2 km (8.2 mi)
- Distance to Niemen River: 88 km (54.7 mi)

Sosnowo Lock is the second lock on the Augustów Canal (from the Biebrza) in Poland. It is located near the village of Sosnowo in the administrative district of Gmina Sztabin, within Augustów County, Podlaskie Voivodeship, in north-eastern Poland. This location lies approximately 10 kilometres (6 mi) north-west of Sztabin, 15 km (9 mi) south of Augustów, and 68 km (42 mi) north of the regional capital Białystok.

As part of the Augustów Canal, the lock was the first waterway (Summit level canal) in Central Europe to provide a direct link between the two major rivers – Vistula River and the Neman River – and it provided a link with the Black Sea to the south through the Oginski Canal, Dnieper River, Berezina Canal and Dvina River. It is currently a conservation protection zone proposed by Poland for inscription onto the World Heritage List of UNESCO. It was completely destroyed during World War II and was rebuilt in 1948.

Camping facilities are available next to the Lock.

- Location: 13.2 kilometer
- Level difference: 2.77 m
- Length: 43.5 m
- Width: 6.10 m
- Gates: Metal
- Years Constructed: 1835-1836, rebuilt 1948
- Project manager: Eng. Wojciech Korczakowski

Next lock upstream	Augustów Canal Navigation	Next lock downstream
Borki Lock; 6.05 km (3.8 mi)	Sosnowo Lock	Dębowo Lock; 12.85 km (8.0 mi)
