= Perkuć Lock =

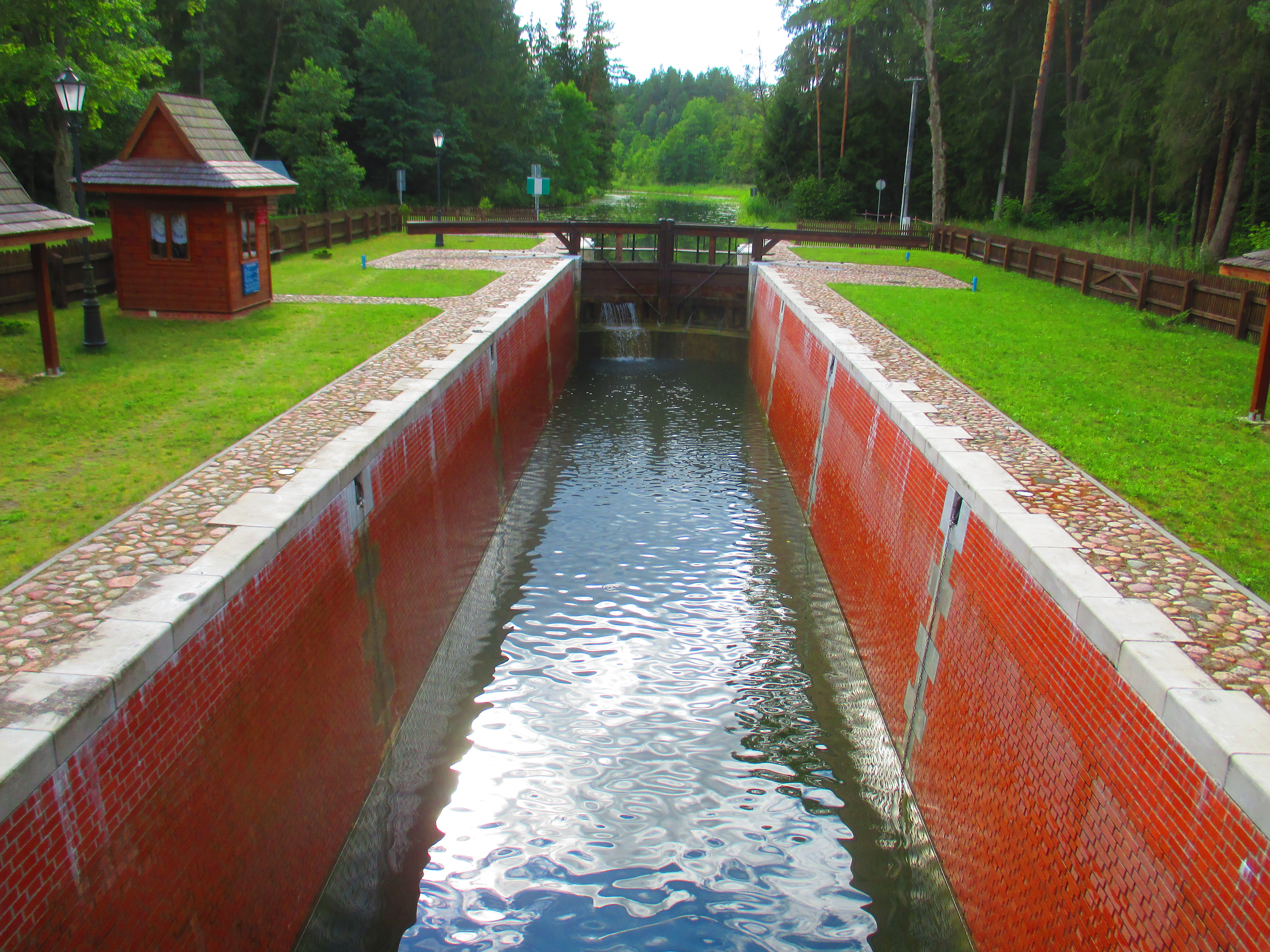
- Lock
- 53°53′57″N 23°19′08″E
- Waterway: Augustów Canal
- Country: Poland
- State: Podlaskie
- County: Augustów
- Maintained by: RZGW
- Operation: Manual
- First built: 1827–1828
- Length: 43.5 m (142.7 ft)
- Width: 6.02 m (19.8 ft)
- Fall: 2.91 m (9.5 ft)
- Distance to Biebrza River: 63.0 km (39.1 mi)
- Distance to Niemen River: 38.2 km (23.7 mi)

Perkuć Lock – tenth of the lock on the Augustów Canal (from the Biebrza). It is located near the Reserve Perkuć. Built between 1827 and 1828 by the Lieutenant. Julian Piędzickiego between Lake Krzywym and Lake Mikaszewo.

- Location: 63 km canal
- difference: 2.91 m
- Length: 43.5 m
- Width: 6.02 m
- Gates: Wooden
- Year built: 1827 – 1828
- Construction Manager: Julian Piędzicki

Next lock upstream	Augustów Canal; Navigation	Next lock downstream
Mikaszówka Lock; 6.1 km (3.8 mi)	Perkuć Lock	Paniewo Lock; 2.1 km (1.3 mi)
