= Tartak Lock =

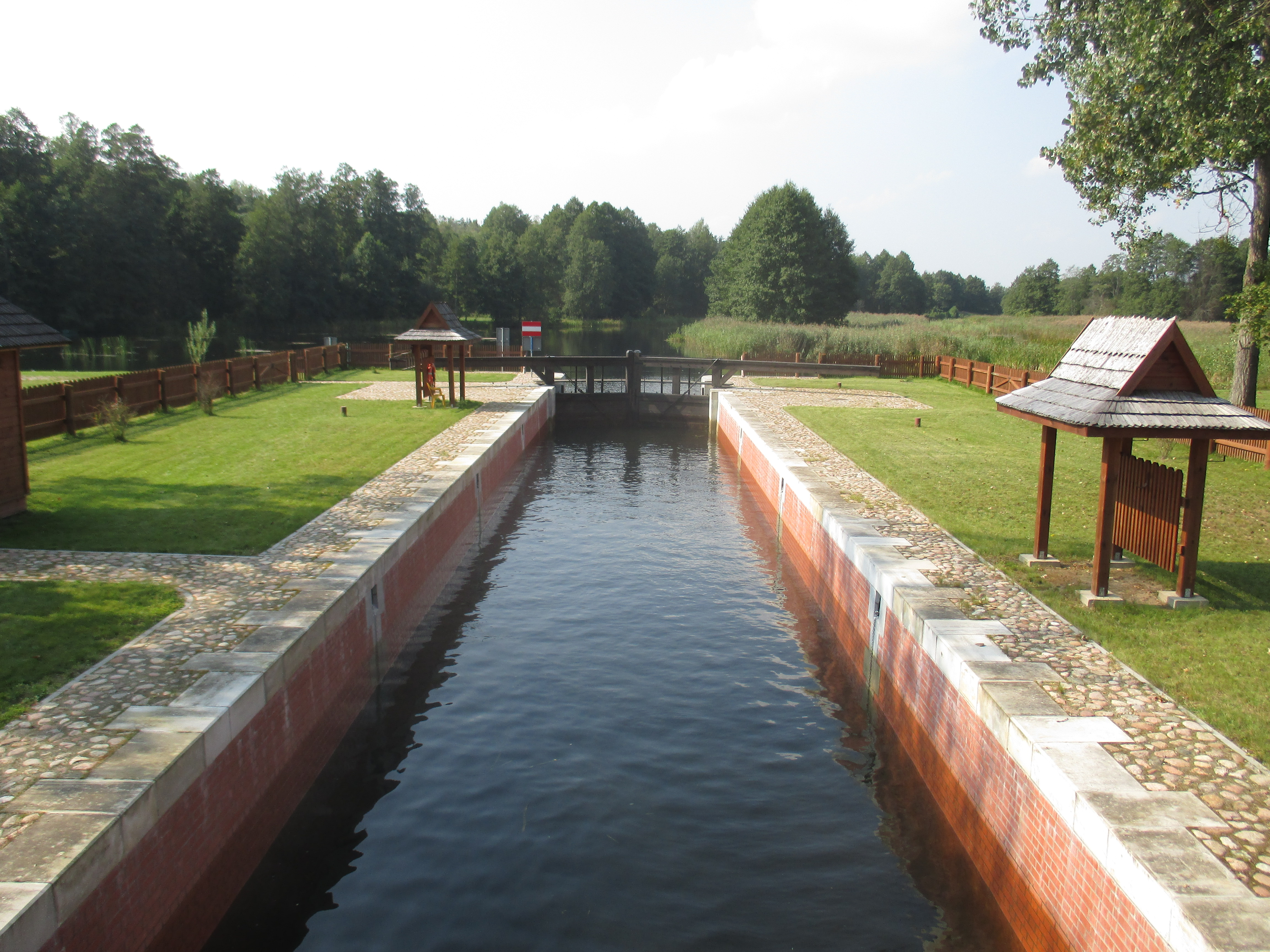
- Lock
- 53°52′57″N 23°27′41″E
- Waterway: Augustów Canal
- Country: Poland
- State: Podlaskie
- County: Augustów
- Maintained by: RZGW
- Operation: Manual
- First built: 1837-1838
- Length: 45.35 m (148.8 ft)
- Width: 6.08 m (19.9 ft)
- Fall: 1.72 m (5.6 ft)
- Distance to Biebrza River: 74.4 km (46.2 mi)
- Distance to Niemen River: 26.8 km (16.7 mi)

Tartak Lock is the thirteenth lock on the Augustow Canal (from the Biebrza). It was not planned in the original draft written by Ignatius Prądzyński. Its construction was necessary because the state of the waters piled high water, and destroyed hydro-technical equipment.

Built between 1837 - 1838 by Eng. Jakub Szeffer.

- Location: 74.4 km channel
- Level difference: 1.72 m
- Length: 45.35 m
- Width: 6.08 m
- Gates: Wooden
- Year built: 1837 - 1838
- Construction Manager: Jakub Szeffer

Next lock upstream	Augustów Canal; Navigation	Next lock downstream
Kudrynki Lock; 3.0 km (1.9 mi)	Tartak Lock	Sosnówek Lock; 4.1 km (2.5 mi)
