= Dambrowka Lock =

Canal lock in Belarus

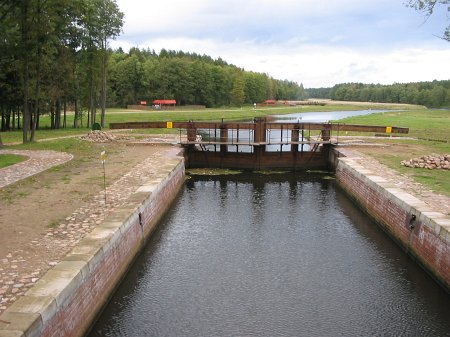
- Dambrowka Lock
- 53.862862°N 23.623599°E
- Waterway: Augustów Canal
- Country: Belarus
- State: Hrodna Voblast
- County: Hrodna District
- Operation: Manual
- First built: 1829
- Latest built: rebuilt 2005-2006
- Length: 43.9 m (144.0 ft)
- Width: 6.10 m (20.0 ft)
- Fall: 3.04 m (10.0 ft)
- Distance to Biebrza River: 85.00 km (52.8 mi)
- Distance to Niemen River: 16.2 km (10.1 mi)

Dambrowka Lock (Belarusian: Шлюз «Дамброўка»), Dąbrówka Lock (Polish: Śluza Dąbrówka) - Seventeenth lock on the Augustów Canal (from the Biebrza). Built in 1829 by George Arnold. The second of the three locks lying on the territory of Belarus. It was renovated in the years 2005 - 2006 and functions as a shipping facility.

- Location: 91.5 km channel
- Level difference: 3.04 m
- Length: 43.9 m
- Width: 6.10 m
- Gates: Wooden
- Year built: 1829
- Construction Manager: Jerzy Arnold

Next lock upstream	Augustów Canal; Navigation	Next lock downstream
Niemnowo Lock; 6.5 km (4.0 mi)	Dambrowka Lock	Wołkuszek Lock; 6.5 km (4.0 mi)
