= Paniewo Lock =

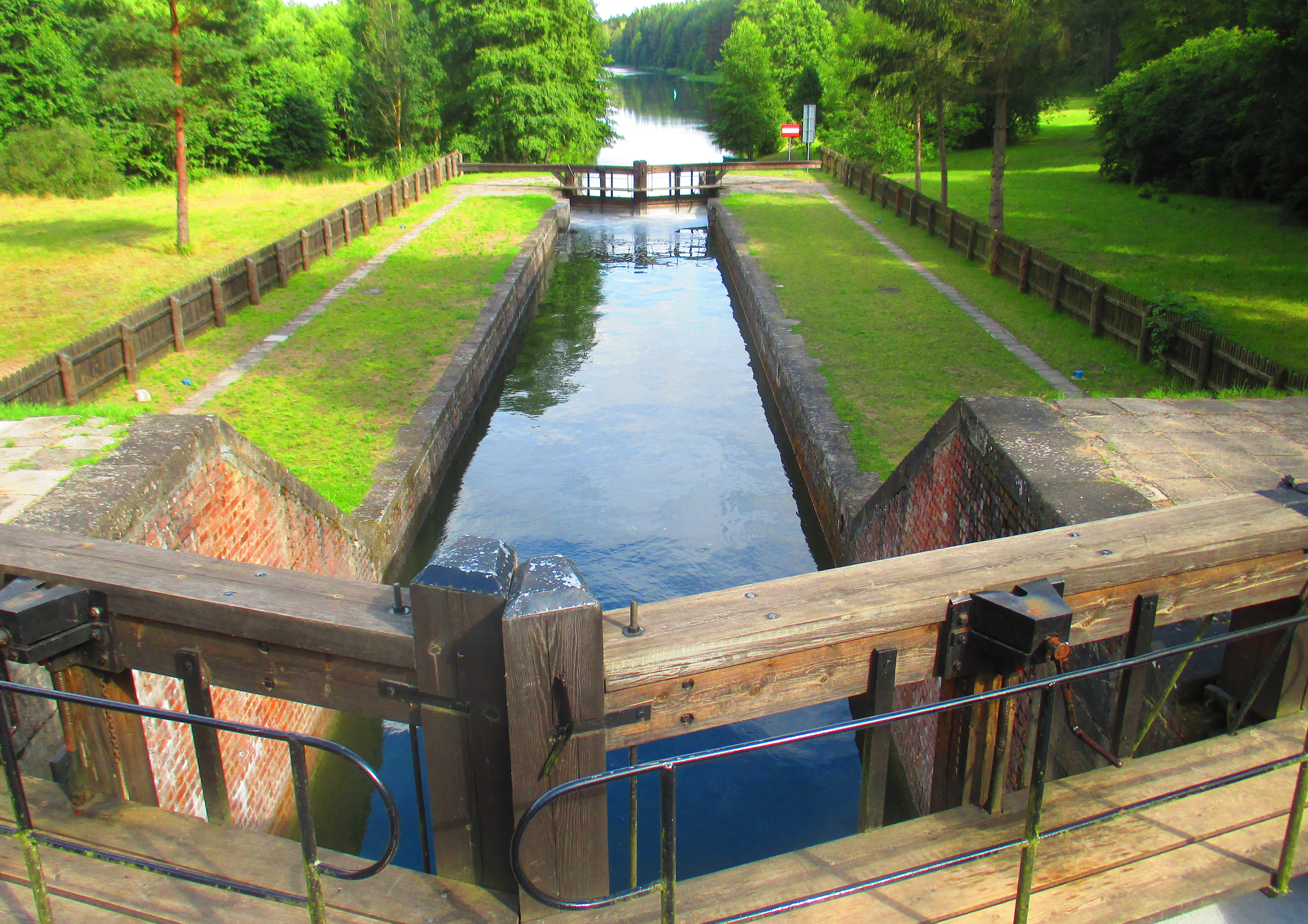
- Lock
- 53°53′55″N 23°17′54″E
- Waterway: Augustów Canal
- Country: Poland
- State: Podlaskie
- County: Augustów
- Maintained by: RZGW
- Operation: Manual
- First built: 1826-1828
- Latest built: rebuilt 1947-1948, repair 1951, repair 1953-1954, repair 1970, rebuilt 1973-1979
- Length: first: 41.41 m (135.9 ft) second: 43.64 m (143.2 ft)
- Width: 5.95 m (19.5 ft)
- Fall: 6.29 m (20.6 ft)
- Distance to Biebrza River: 60.9 km (37.8 mi)
- Distance to Niemen River: 40.3 km (25.0 mi)

Paniewo Lock - ninth lock on the Augustów Canal (from the Biebrza). The only twin-chamber lock on the Augustów Canal in Poland.

Built between 1826 - 1828 by Michał Horain. Due to the large difference in levels between Lake Paniewo and Lake Krivoy, which is more than 6 m lock consists of two interconnected chambers, and the time of going through is about 40 minutes. The enormous pressure of water and ground water filtration strong meant that even before World War I was necessary overhaul.

Was destroyed during World War II, including the successful action of sabotage carried out by the troops of Army 20 July 1944

After the war, the lock repaired in years:

- 1947 - 1948: reconstruction of war damages
- 1951: an attempt to seal the soil by electroosmosis
- 1953 - 1954: replacement of the wooden floor of reinforced concrete, filling the cavities formed concrete, drainage along the walls
- 1970: a rescue attempt by injections of concrete structures
- 1973 - 1979 has been completely demolished a lock, then was rebuilt using modern materials and techniques, but preserving the original appearance and operating system.
- Location: 61 km canal
- Level difference: 6.29 m
- Length: 88 m (first chamber: 41.41 m, second chamber: 43.64 m)
- Width: 5.95 m
- Gates: Wooden
- Year built: 1826 - 1828
- Construction Manager: Michał Horain

| Next lock upstream | Augustów Canal; Navigation | Next lock downstream |
| Perkuć Lock; 2.1 km (1.3 mi) | Paniewo Lock | Gorczyca Lock; 3.9 km (2.4 mi) |
