= Borki Lock =

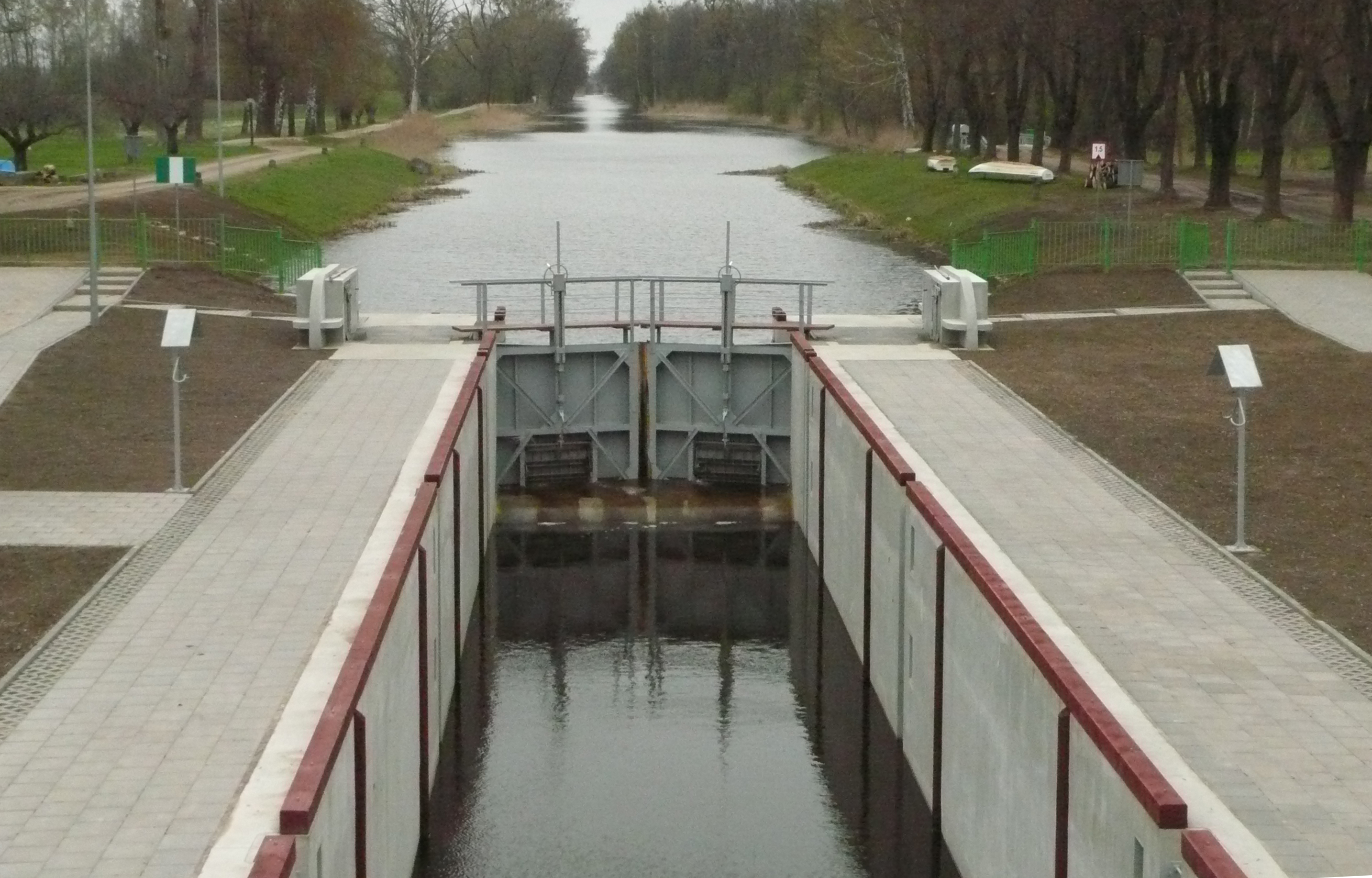
- Lock
- 53.755095°N 22.915075°E
- Waterway: Augustów Canal
- Country: Poland
- State: Podlaskie
- County: Augustów
- Maintained by: RZGW
- Operation: Manual
- First built: 1835–1836
- Latest built: rebuilt 1948
- Length: 44.0 m (144.4 ft)
- Width: 6.1 m (20.0 ft)
- Fall: 2.89 m (9.5 ft)
- Distance to Biebrza River: 19.25 km (12.0 mi)
- Distance to Niemen River: 81.95 km (50.9 mi)

Borki Lock – the third lock on the Augustów Canal (from the Biebrza) and is located in Poland. It was completely destroyed during WW II and was rebuilt in 1948.

Rebuilt from the ground up in 1948 after the war. Concrete, single chamber. The lockable steel gates wspornymi, inflated circulation through the channels.

Manual drive. Max declined 3.19 m.

- Location: 19.25 kilometer
- Level difference: 2.89 m
- Length: 44.0 m
- Width: 6.10 m
- Gates: Metal
- Years Constructed: 1835–1836, rebuilt 1948
- Project manager: Eng. Wojciech Korczakowski

Next lock upstream	Augustów Canal; Navigation	Next lock downstream
Białobrzegi Lock; 7.85 km (4.9 mi)	Borki Lock	Sosnowo Lock; 6.05 km (3.8 mi)
