= Sosnówek Lock =

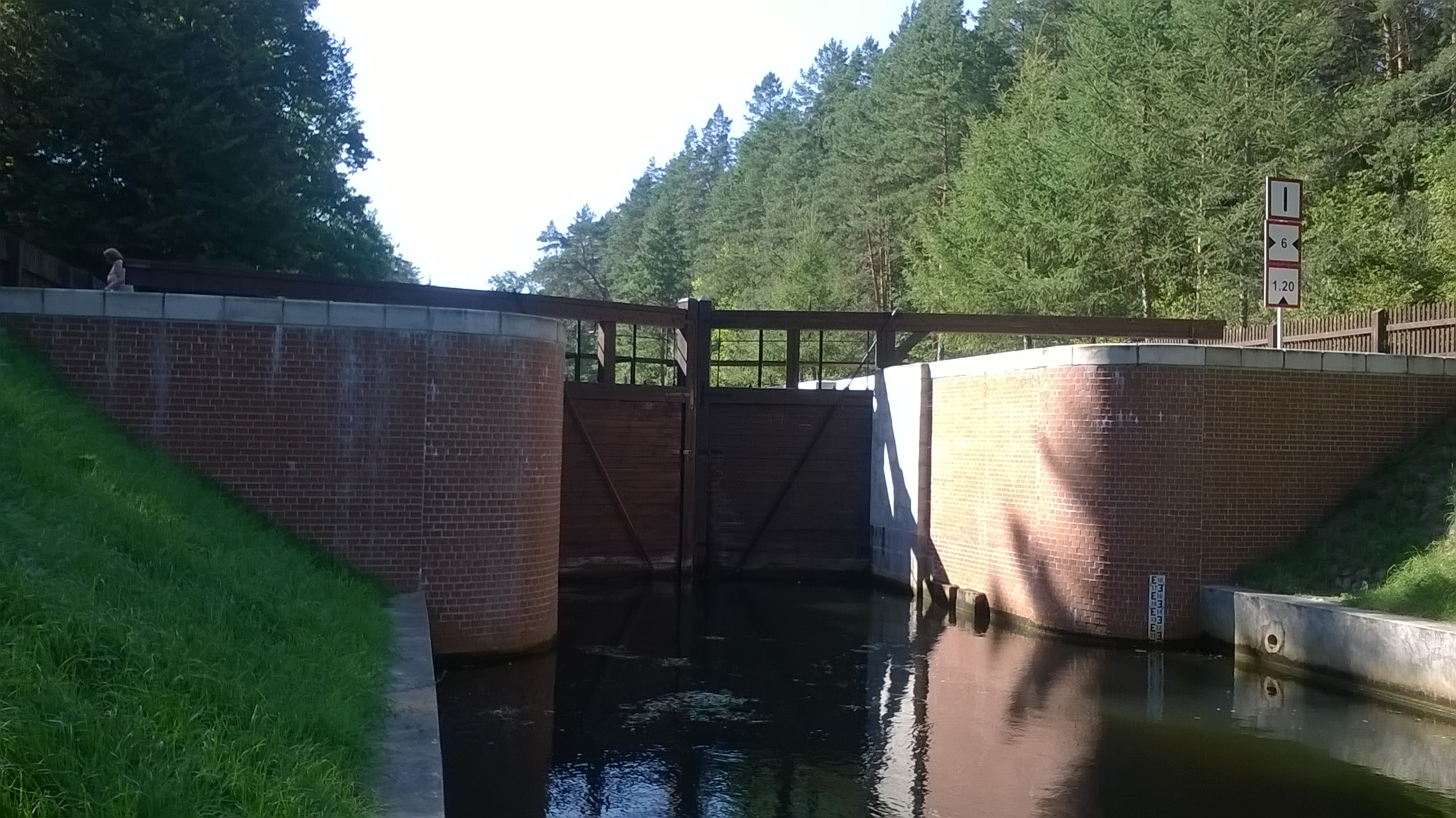
- Lock
- 53.891393°N 23.413226°E
- Waterway: Augustów Canal
- Country: Poland
- State: Podlaskie
- County: Augustów
- Maintained by: RZGW
- Operation: Manual
- First built: 1828
- Length: 44.4 m (145.7 ft)
- Width: 6.10 m (20.0 ft)
- Fall: 2.98 m (9.8 ft)
- Distance to Biebrza River: 70.3 km (43.7 mi)
- Distance to Niemen River: 30.9 km (19.2 mi)

Sosnówek Lock - the twelfth lock on the Augustów Canal (from the Biebrza). It combines artificial part of the canal with a section running through the Black Hancza. Built in 1828 by Lt. Eng. Konstantin Jodko.

- Location: 71.2 km channel
- Level difference: 2.98 m
- Length: 44.40 m
- Width: 6.10 m
- Gates: Wooden
- Year built: 1828
- Construction Manager: Konstantin Jodko

Next lock upstream	Augustów Canal; Navigation	Next lock downstream
Tartak Lock; 4.1 km (2.5 mi)	Sosnówek Lock	Mikaszówka Lock; 1.2 km (0.7 mi)
