= Dębowo Lock =

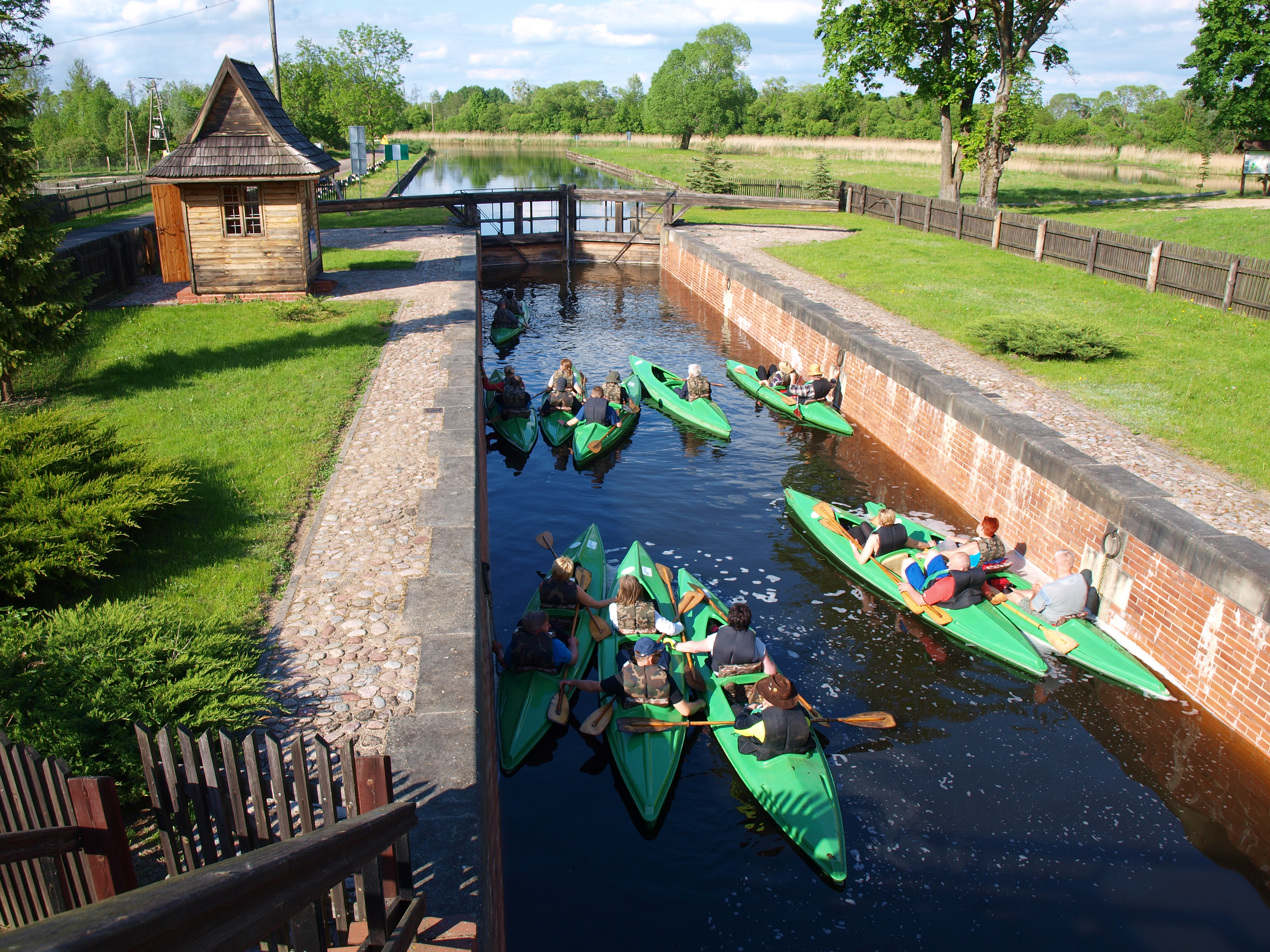
- Lock
- 53.609978°N 22.930051°E
- Waterway: Augustów Canal
- Country: Poland
- State: Podlaskie
- County: Augustów
- Maintained by: RZGW
- Operation: Manual
- First built: 1826-1827
- Latest built: rebuilt 1946 rebuilt 1997-2003
- Length: 43.9 m (144.0 ft)
- Width: 6.1 m (20.0 ft)
- Fall: 2.07 m (6.8 ft)
- Distance to Biebrza River: 0.35 km (0.2 mi)
- Distance to Niemen River: 100.85 km (62.7 mi)

Dębowo Lock - the first lock on the Augustów Canal (from the Biebrza) near the village of Dębowo in the administrative district of Gmina Sztabin, within Augustów County, Podlaskie Voivodeship, in north-eastern Poland. It lies approximately 15 km (9 mi) south-west of Sztabin, 27 km (17 mi) south of Augustów, and 58 km (36 mi) north of the regional capital Białystok.

As part of the Augustów Canal the lock was the first waterway (Summit level canal) in Central Europe to provide a direct link between the two major rivers, Vistula River and the Neman River, and it provided a link with the Black Sea to the south through the Oginski Canal, Dnieper River, Berezina Canal and Dvina River. It is currently a conservation protection zone proposed by Poland for inscription onto the World Heritage List of UNESCO.

single-chamber, - concrete brick. From the devastation of war was renovated in 1946, and in the years 1997-2003 were subjected to a thorough renovation. Difference of 3.11 m. The water level lockable wooden door.

Cell dimensions 43.56 x 6.04 m. Hand drive. In the vicinity of the sluice and weir valvular vent used to propel a small hydropower plant. Part of the team locks are buildings from the early twentieth century lock

- Location: 0.35 kilometer
- Level difference: 2.07 m
- Length: 43.9 m
- Width: 6.10 m
- Gates: Wood
- Years Constructed: 1826-1827
- Project manager: Lieutenant. Eng. Michael Przyrembel

Next lock upstream	Augustów Canal Navigation	Next lock downstream
Sosnowo Lock; 12.85 km (8.0 mi)	Dębowo Lock	Biebrza River; 0.35 km (0.2 mi)
