= Augustów Lock =

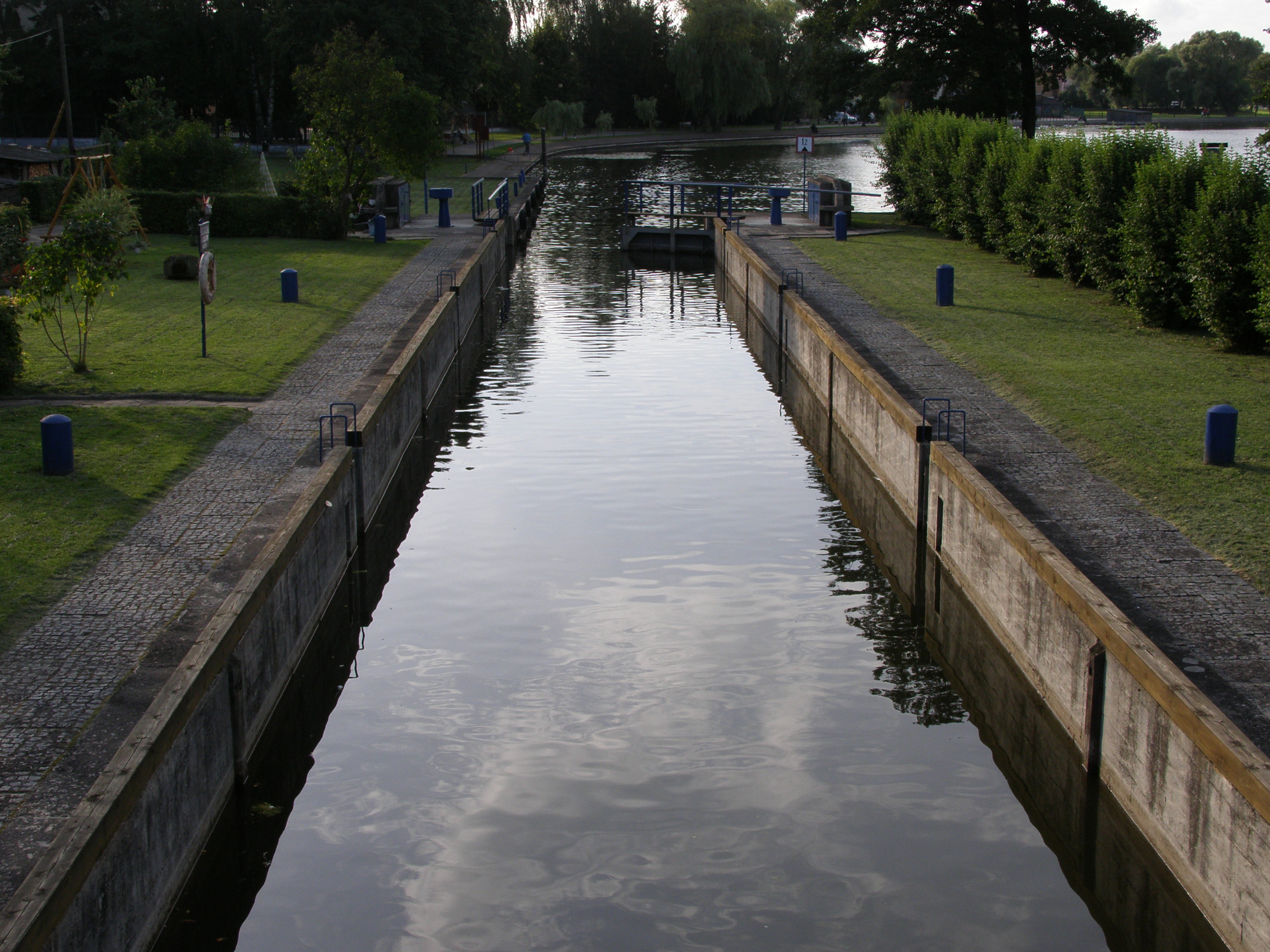
- Lock
- 53.841365°N 22.990948°E
- Waterway: Augustów Canal
- Country: Poland
- State: Podlaskie
- County: Augustów
- Maintained by: RZGW
- Operation: Manual
- First built: 1825–1826
- Latest built: rebuilt 1947–1948
- Length: 46.8 m (153.5 ft)
- Width: 6.02 m (19.8 ft)
- Fall: 2.44 m (8.0 ft)
- Distance to Biebrza River: 32.5 km (20.2 mi)
- Distance to Niemen River: 68.7 km (42.7 mi)

Augustów Lock – the fifth lock on the Augustów Canal (from the Biebrza River). It is located in Augustów, Poland near National Road No 8 and built between 1825 and 1826 by cf Eng. Konstanty Jodko It was blown up in 1944 by an army of the Third Reich and rebuilt in its present form by "HYDROTREST" in the years 1947–1948 Under a new projectit will use of metal gates with channels of circulation and the gate mechanisms for opening the gates i driven by cranks. The result of these upgrades is an extension of time of about 7 minutes.

- Location: 32.5 km channel
- Level difference: 2.44 m
- Length: 46.8 m
- Width: 6.02 m
- Gates: metal
- Year built: 1825–1826, rebuilt 1947–1948
- Construction Manager: cf Eng. Konstanty Jodko

Next lock upstream	Augustów Canal; Navigation	Next lock downstream
Przewięź Lock; 10 km (6.2 mi)	Augustów Lock	Białobrzegi Lock; 5.4 km (3.4 mi)
