= Mikaszówka Lock =

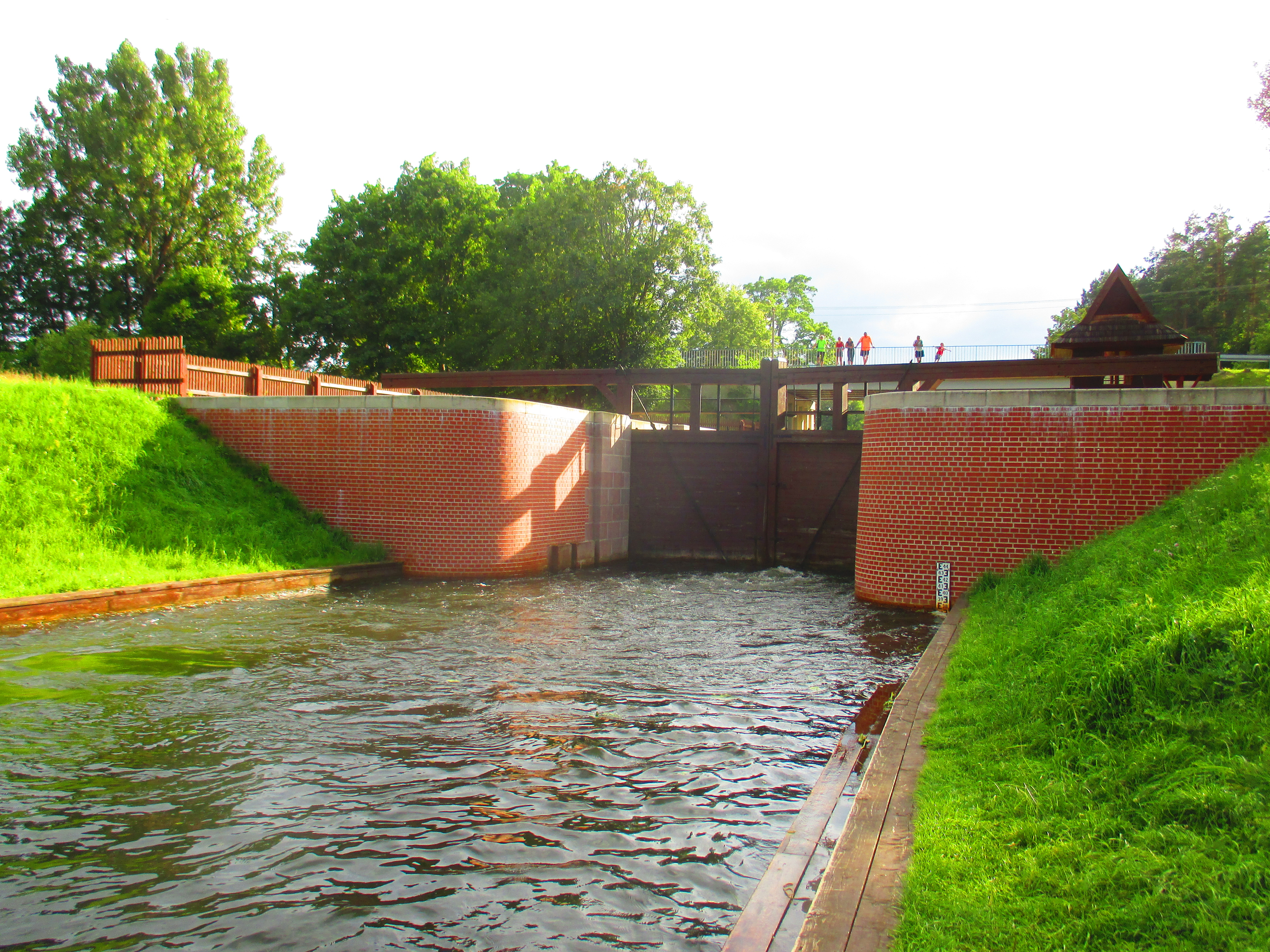
- Lock
- 53°53′23″N 23°23′48″E
- Waterway: Augustów Canal
- Country: Poland
- State: Podlaskie
- County: Augustów
- Maintained by: RZGW
- Operation: Manual
- First built: 1828
- Length: 43.31 m (142.1 ft)
- Width: 6.05 m (19.8 ft)
- Fall: 2.44 m (8.0 ft)
- Distance to Biebrza River: 69.1 km (42.9 mi)
- Distance to Niemen River: 32.1 km (19.9 mi)

Mikaszówka Lock - the eleventh lock on the Augustów Canal (from the Biebrza). Located near the village Mikaszówka. Built in 1828 by Lt. Eng. Wojciech Korczakowski.

- Location: 69.1 km channel
- Level difference: 2.44 m
- Length: 43.31 m
- Width: 6.05 m
- Gates: Wooden
- Year built: 1828
- Construction Manager: Wojciech Korczakowski

Next lock upstream	Augustów Canal; Navigation	Next lock downstream
Sosnówek Lock; 1.2 km (0.7 mi)	Mikaszówka Lock	Perkuć Lock; 6.1 km (3.8 mi)
