= Przewięź Lock =

Sixth lock on the Augustów Canal in Przewięź, Poland

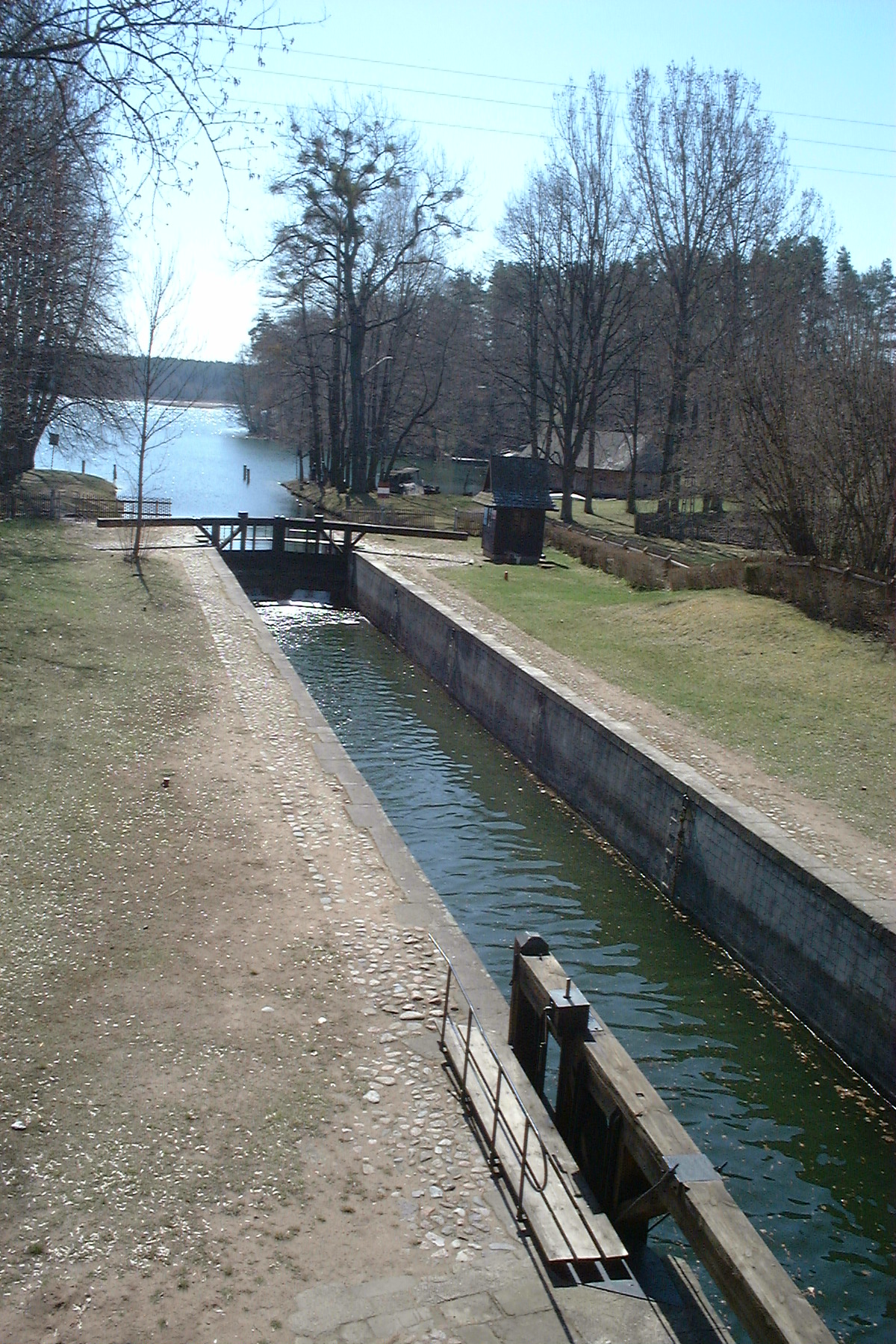
- Lock
- 53°52′02″N 23°05′32″E
- Waterway: Augustów Canal
- Country: Poland
- State: Podlaskie
- County: Augustów
- Maintained by: RZGW
- Operation: Manual
- First built: 1825–1826
- Latest built: rebuilt 1947–1948
- Length: 46.17 m (151.5 ft)
- Width: 5.96 m (19.6 ft)
- Fall: 0.86 m (2.8 ft)
- Distance to Biebrza River: 32.5 km (20.2 mi)
- Distance to Niemen River: 68.7 km (42.7 mi)

Przewięź Lock - the sixth lock on the Augustów Canal (from the Biebrza River). Located in the village Przewięź, Poland between the lakes Lake Studzieniczne and Lake Białe Augustowskie was built in the 1826–1827 by Lt.-Col. Eng. August Szulc. To this day, preserved in their original condition.

- Location: 43.6 km channel
- Level difference: 0.86 m
- Length: 46.17 m
- Width: 5.96 m
- Gates: Wooden
- Year built: 1826–1827
- Construction Manager: Lt.-Col. Eng. August Szulc

| Next lock upstream | Augustów Canal; Navigation | Next lock downstream |
| Swoboda Lock; 3.9 km (2.4 mi) | Przewięź Lock | Augustów Lock; 10 km (6.2 mi) |
