= Kurzyniec Lock =

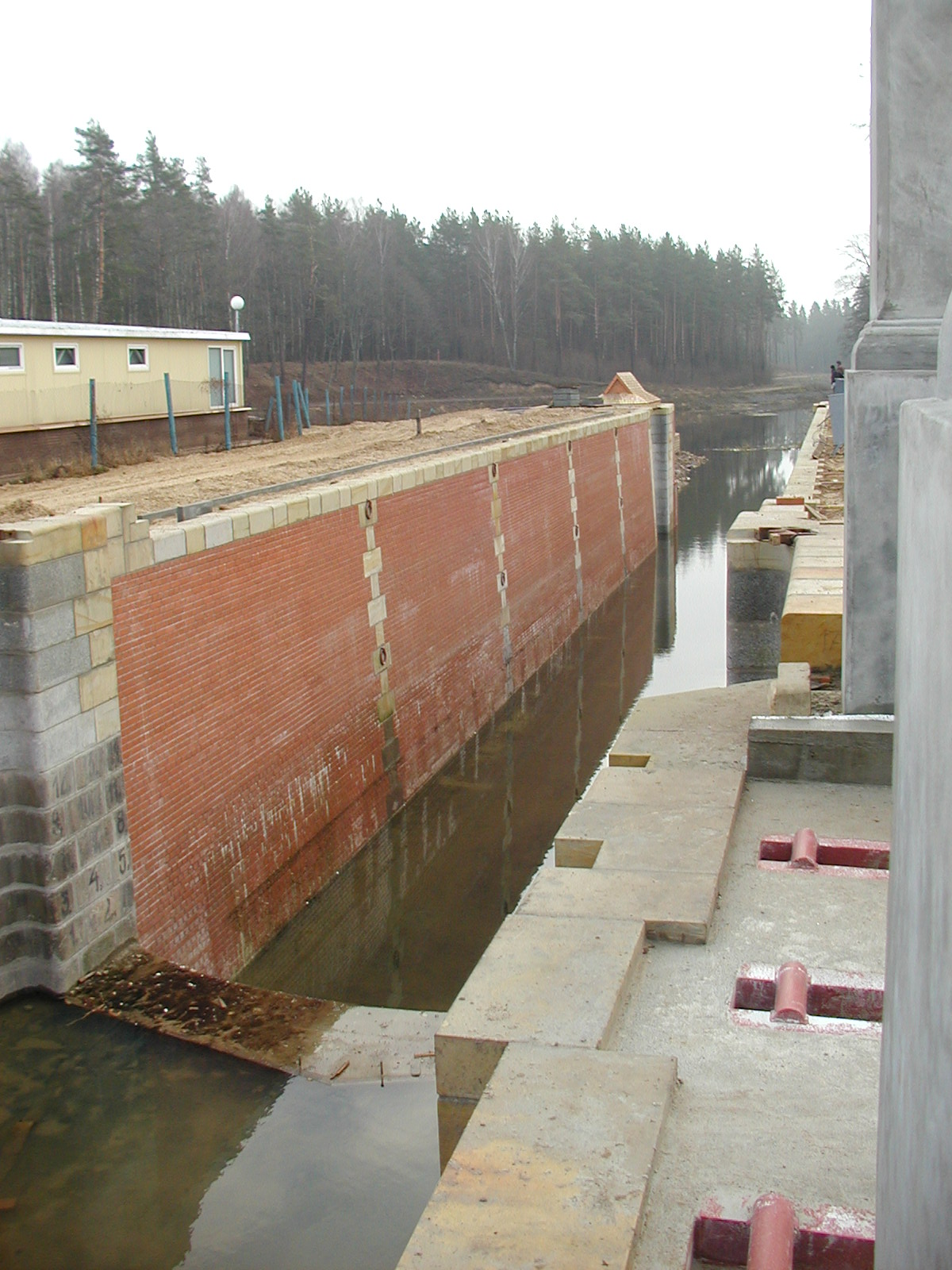
- Kurzyniec Lock being rebuilt in December 2006
- 53.86364°N 23.523851°E
- Waterway: Augustów Canal
- Country: Belarus; Poland
- State: Grodno Region; Podlaskie Voivodeship
- County: Grodno District; Augustów County
- Operation: Manual
- First built: 1828-1829
- Latest built: rebuilt 2006-2007
- Length: 44.6 m (146.3 ft)
- Width: 6.0 m (19.7 ft)
- Fall: 2.98 m (9.8 ft)
- Distance to Biebrza River: 81.75 km (50.8 mi)
- Distance to Niemen River: 19.45 km (12.1 mi)

Kurzyniec Lock (Polish: Śluza Kurzyniec), Kuzhyniec Lock (Belarusian: Шлюз «Кужынец») is a fifteenth lock on the Augustów Canal (from the Biebrza) in the administrative district of Gmina Płaska, within Augustów County, Podlaskie Voivodeship, in north-eastern Poland, and the border with Belarus runs down the center line of the lock. It lies approximately 18 kilometres (11 mi) east of Płaska, 36 km (22 mi) east of Augustów, and 87 km (54 mi) north of the regional capital Białystok. The Polish-Belarus border runs along the axis and this lock on the canal for a length of 3.5 km.

Sluice is situated near the village of Rudawka. Lock construction began in 1828 cf. Eng. Constantine Jodko and ended in 1829 noted. Eng. F. Wielhorski. The name comes from the former village of Kurzyniec that used to be sited on both sides of the canal.

The lock has been closed since 1939, but under an agreement between the Government of the Polish Republic and the Government of the Republic of Belarus contained in Augustów on 8 March 2005 on the reconstruction of the canal section of the border has been the ongoing renovations since fall of 2006 to June 2007.

The edges of the lock drawbridge connects with four concrete pillars. During the summer there is open border crossing to do.

Specifications

- Location: 81.75 km channel
- Level difference: 2.98 m
- Length: 44.6 m
- Width: 6 m
- Gates: Wooden
- Year of construction: 1828-1829
- Construction Manager: Konstantin Jodko, F. Wielhorski

== Notes ==
Next lock upstream	Augustów Canal; Navigation	Next lock downstream
Wołkuszek Lock; 3.25 km (2.0 mi)	Kurzyniec Lock	Kudrynki Lock; 4.35 km (2.7 mi)
