= Swoboda Lock =

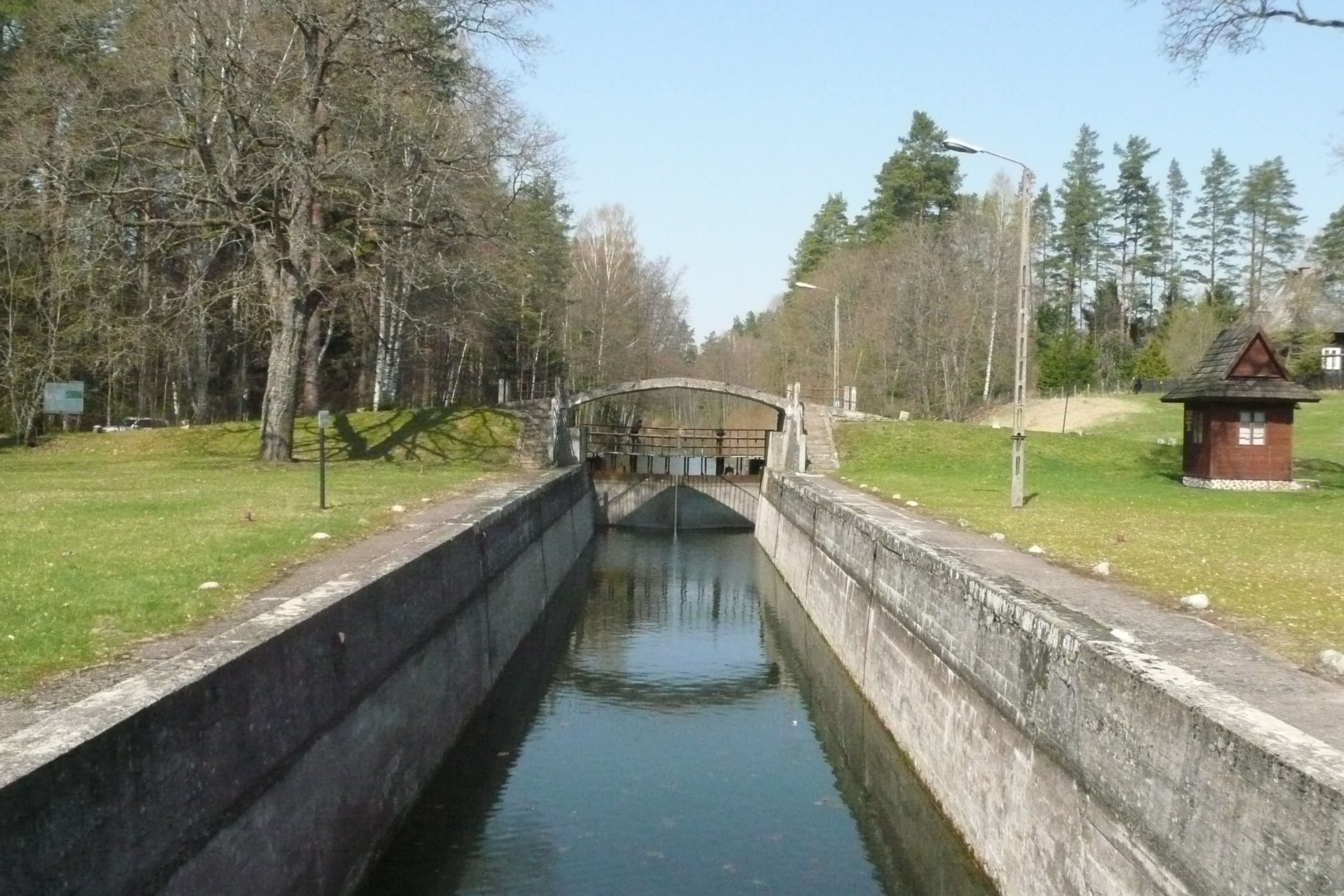
- Lock
- 53°52′00″N 23°08′42″E
- Waterway: Augustów Canal
- Country: Poland
- State: Podlaskie
- County: Augustów
- Maintained by: RZGW
- Operation: Manual
- First built: 1826-1827
- Latest built: rebuilt 1960's
- Length: 45.77 m (150.2 ft)
- Width: 5.95 m (19.5 ft)
- Fall: 1.7 m (5.6 ft)
- Distance to Biebrza River: 47.7 km (29.6 mi)
- Distance to Niemen River: 53.5 km (33.2 mi)

Swoboda Lock is the seventh lock on the Augustów Canal (from the Biebrza). It is situated amidst the Augustów Forest near Lake Studzieniczne. It was built between 1826 and 1827 by Lt.-Col. Eng. Jan Paweł Lelewel. In the 1960s it underwent modernization involving the replacement of original wooden gates with metal crank-driven mechanism raised, reinforced concrete bridge was built a distinctive and concreting awanportu. New system to move the gates did not work and was later by one of the membranes removed, and replaced the original system of drawbars.

- Location: 47.4 km channel
- Level difference: 1.7 m
- Length: 45.77 m
- Width: 5.95 m
- Gates: metal
- Year of construction: 1826–1827
- Construction Manager: Lt.-Col. Eng. John Paul Lelewel

Next lock upstream	Augustów Canal; Navigation	Next lock downstream
Gorczyca Lock; 9.6 km (6.0 mi)	Swoboda Lock	Przewięź Lock; 3.9 km (2.4 mi)
