= Gorczyca Lock =

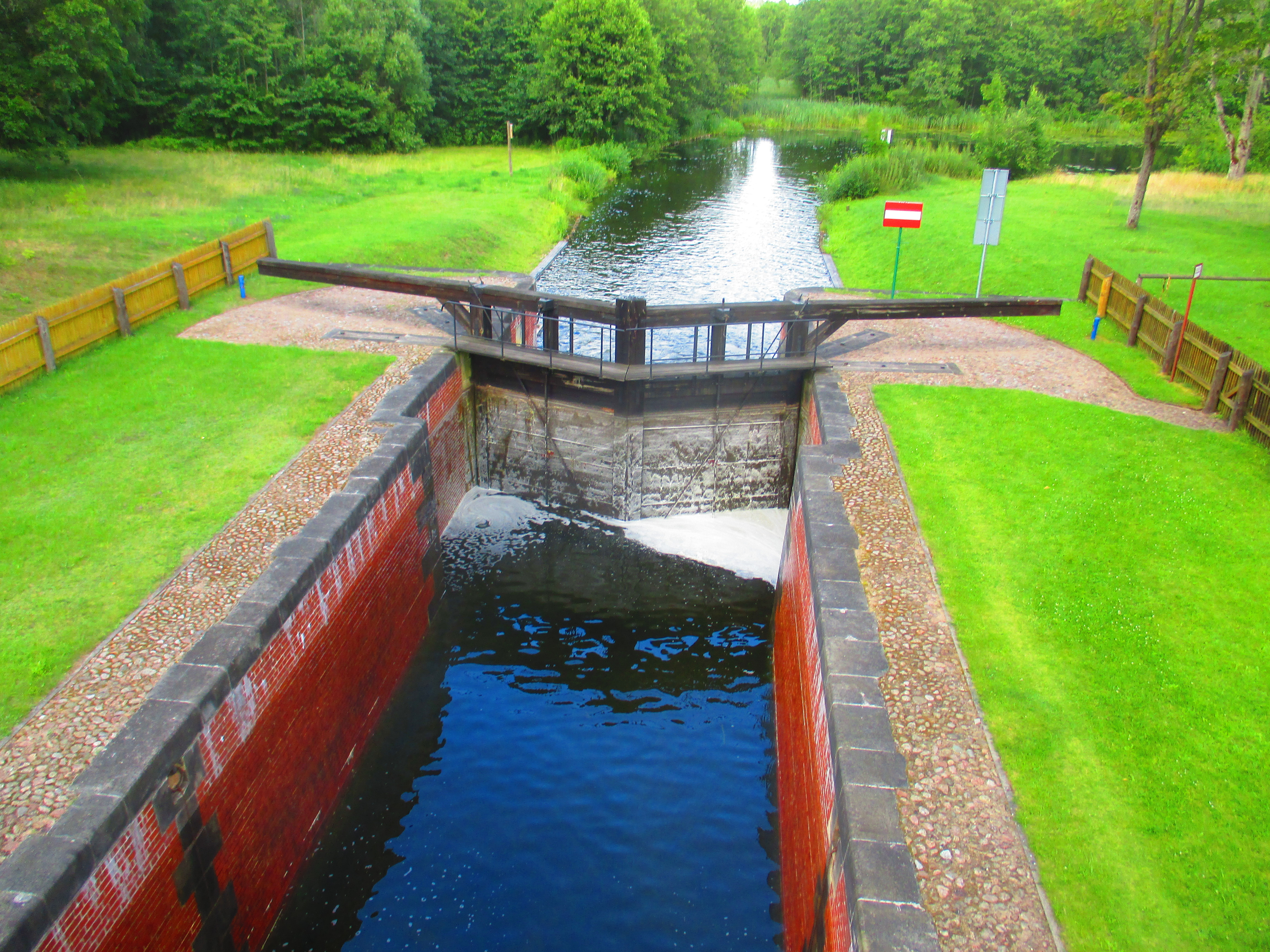
- Lock
- 53.90663°N 23.24726°E
- Waterway: Augustów Canal
- Country: Poland
- State: Podlaskie
- County: Augustów
- Maintained by: RZGW
- Operation: Manual
- First built: 1828
- Latest built: rebuilt 1947-1948, rebuilt 1954, rebuilt 2003
- Length: 43.23 m (141.8 ft)
- Width: 5.95 m (19.5 ft)
- Fall: 2.81 m (9.2 ft)
- Distance to Biebrza River: 57.0 km (35.4 mi)
- Distance to Niemen River: 44.2 km (27.5 mi)

Gorczyca Lock - Eighth lock on the Augustów Canal (from the Biebrza). Located in the village of Gorczyca.

Built in 1828 by Eng. Jerzy Arnold. In 1944, she was damaged by the Home Army during the action diversion. Rebuilt from the devastation of World War II in the years 1947 - 1948 and 1954. Another major renovation was completed in 2003 thanks to him lock regained its original appearance and design.

- Location: 57 km canal
- Level difference: 2.81 m
- Length: 43.23 m
- Width: 5.95 m
- Gates: Wooden
- Year built: 1828
- Construction Manager: Eng. Jerzy Arnoldl

Next lock upstream	Augustów Canal; Navigation	Next lock downstream
Paniewo Lock; 3.9 km (2.4 mi)	Gorczyca Lock	Swoboda Lock; 9.6 km (6.0 mi)
