= Kudrynki Lock =

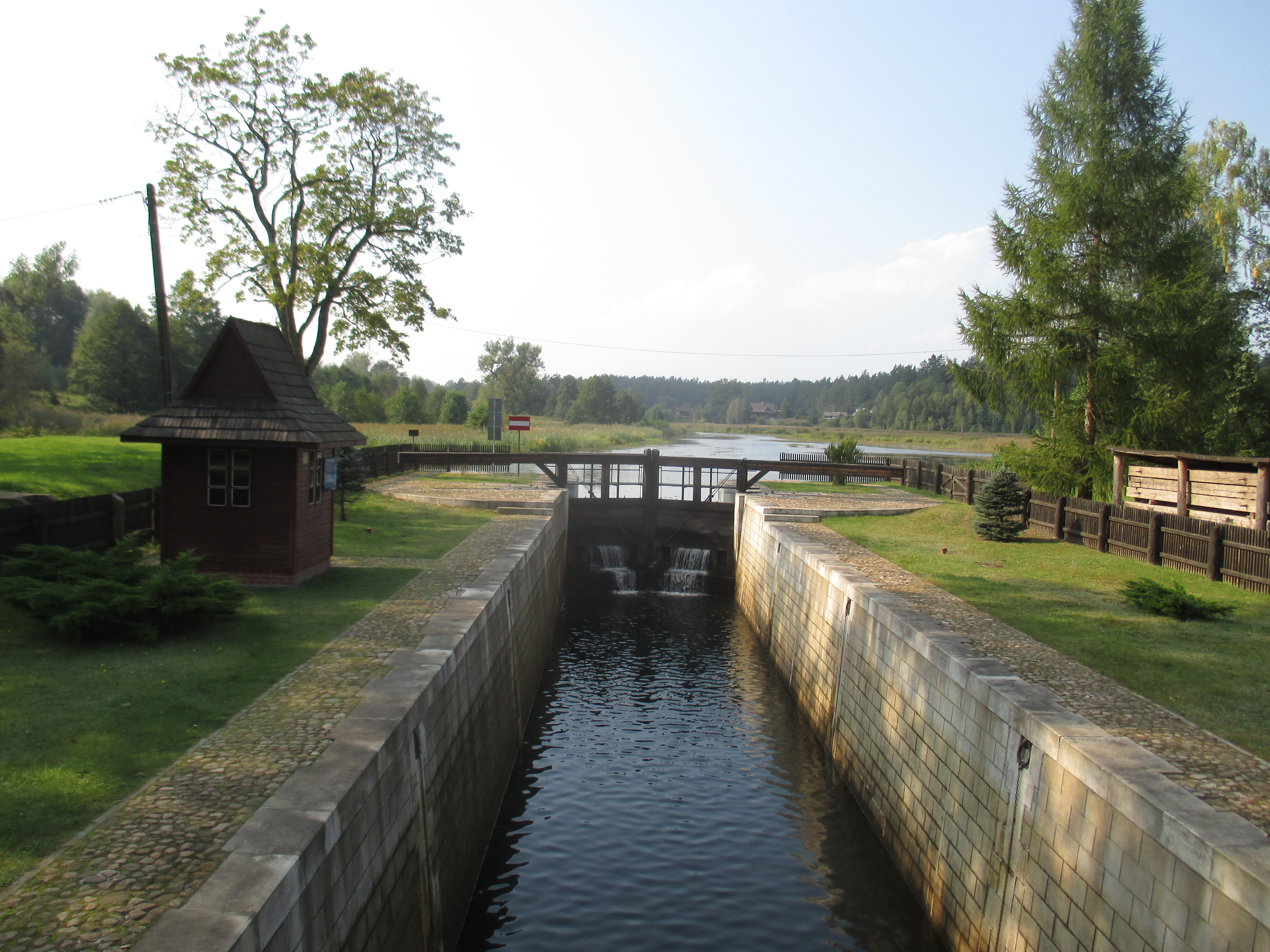
- Lock
- 53.878493°N 23.501558°E
- Waterway: Augustów Canal
- Country: Poland
- State: Podlaskie
- County: Augustów
- Maintained by: RZGW
- Operation: Manual
- First built: 1828–1829
- Latest built: rebuilt 2005–2008
- Length: 43.4 m (142.4 ft)
- Width: 5.94 m (19.5 ft)
- Fall: 2.27 m (7.4 ft)
- Distance to Biebrza River: 77.4 km (48.1 mi)
- Distance to Niemen River: 23.8 km (14.8 mi)

Kudrynki Lock – the fourteenth lock on the Augustów Canal (from the Biebrza). Built between 1828 and 1829 by Edward Tadeusz Bieliński and Michał Horain. Closed since the end of World War II until the last overhaul was carried out in 2005–2008.

- Location: 77.4 km channel
- Level difference: 2.27 m
- Length: 43.4 m
- Width: 5.94 m
- Gates: Wooden
- Year built: 1828 – 1829
- Construction Managers: Edward Tadeusz Bieliński and Michał Horain

Next lock upstream	Augustów Canal; Navigation	Next lock downstream
Kurzyniec Lock; 4.35 km (2.7 mi)	Kudrynki Lock	Tartak Lock; 3.0 km (1.9 mi)
