= Augustów Canal =

Canal in Poland

Augustów Canal Polish: Kanał Augustowski Belarusian: Аўгустоўскі канал
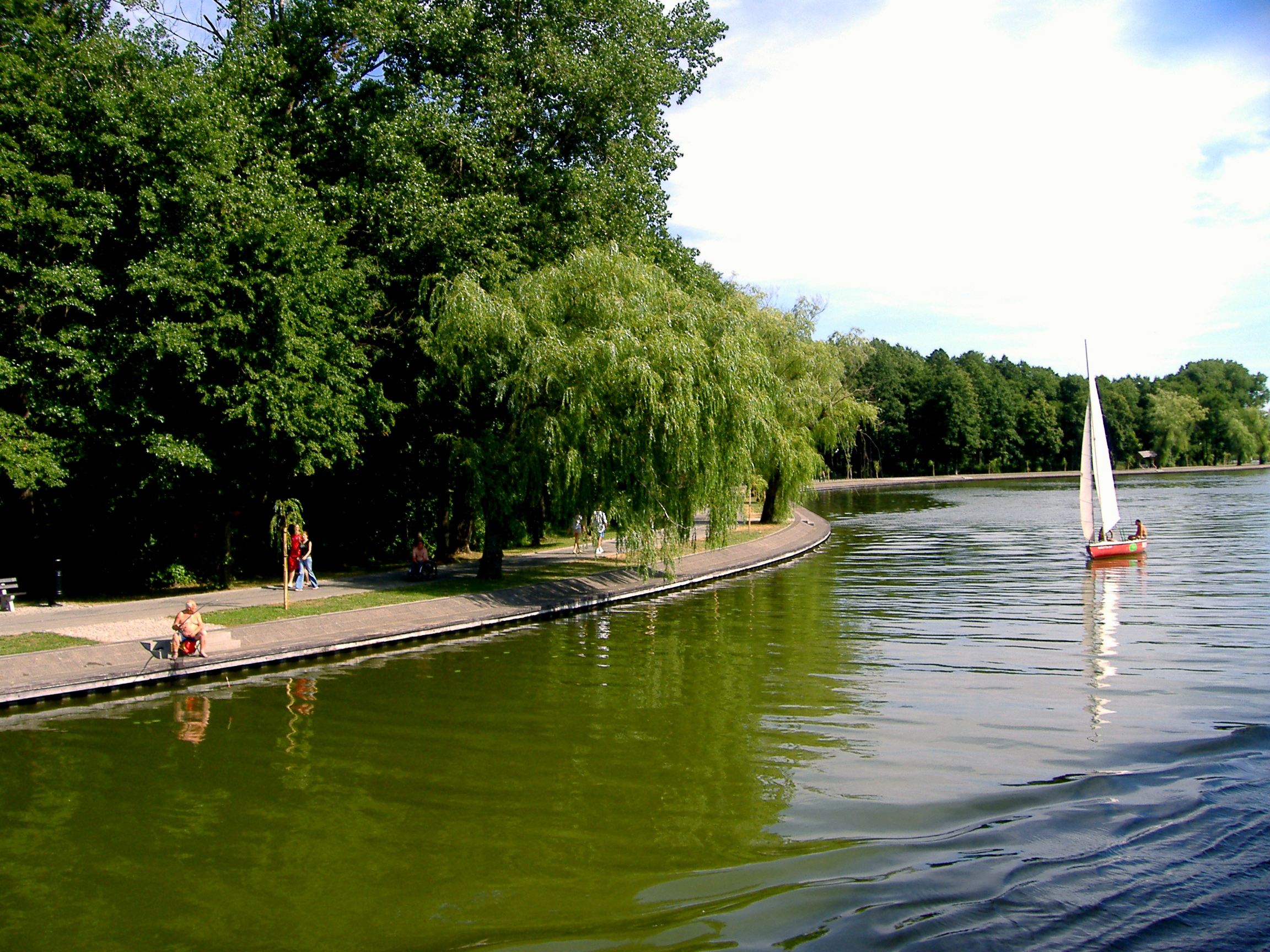
- Augustów Canal in Augustów

Specifications
- Length: 101.2 km (62.9 miles)
- Locks: 18
- Status: Open
- Navigation authority: Regional Water Management Authority in Bialystok (RZGW Białystok)

History
- Principal engineer: Ignacy Prądzyński
- Other engineer(s): Jan Chrzciciel de Grandville Malletski; Jan Paweł Lelewel
- Construction began: 1823
- Date completed: 1839

Geography
- Start point: Biebrza River near Dębowo, Poland
- End point: Neman River near Sapotskin, Belarus
- Connects to: Bystry Canal

The Augustów Canal (Polish: Kanał Augustowski, [ˈkanau̯ au̯ɡusˈtɔfski], Belarusian: Аўгустоўскі канал, romanized: Aŭhustoŭski kanal) is a cross-border canal built by the Congress Kingdom of Poland in 19th century in the Augustów Voivodeship (present-day Podlaskie Voivodeship of northeastern Poland and Grodno Oblast of western Belarus). From the time it was first built, the canal was described by experts as a technological marvel, with numerous sluices contributing to its aesthetic appeal.

It was the first summit level canal in Central Europe to provide a direct link between the two major rivers, Vistula River through the Biebrza River – a tributary of the Narew River, and the Neman River through its tributary – the Czarna Hańcza River, and it provided a link with the Black Sea to the south through the Oginski Canal, Daugava River, Berezina Canal and Dnieper River. It uses a post-glacial channel depression, forming the chain of Augustów lakes, and the river valleys of the Biebrza, the Netta, the Czarna Hańcza and the Neman, which made it possible to perfectly integrate the Canal with the surrounding elements of the natural environment.

The reasons behind the construction of the Augustów Canal were both political and economic. In 1821, Prussia introduced repressively high customs duties for the transit of Russian Empire goods through its territory, which hindered access of traders to the Baltic seaports through the Vistula River. In 1822, Congress Poland was granted measures of commercial autonomy from Russian Empire's customs area. In the years 1823–1839 a waterway was constructed, bypassing the Prussian territory, intended eventually to link, via the Windawski Canal, the center of the Russian-controlled Congress Poland with the Baltic seaport of Ventspils in the province of Kurland. This goal was relinquished due to unrest caused by the 1830–1831 November Uprising against Russia and revised trade agreements with Prussia.

The completed part of the Augustów Canal remained an inland waterway of local significance used for commercial shipping and to transport wood to and from the Vistula and Neman Rivers until rendered obsolete by the regional railway network.

== History ==
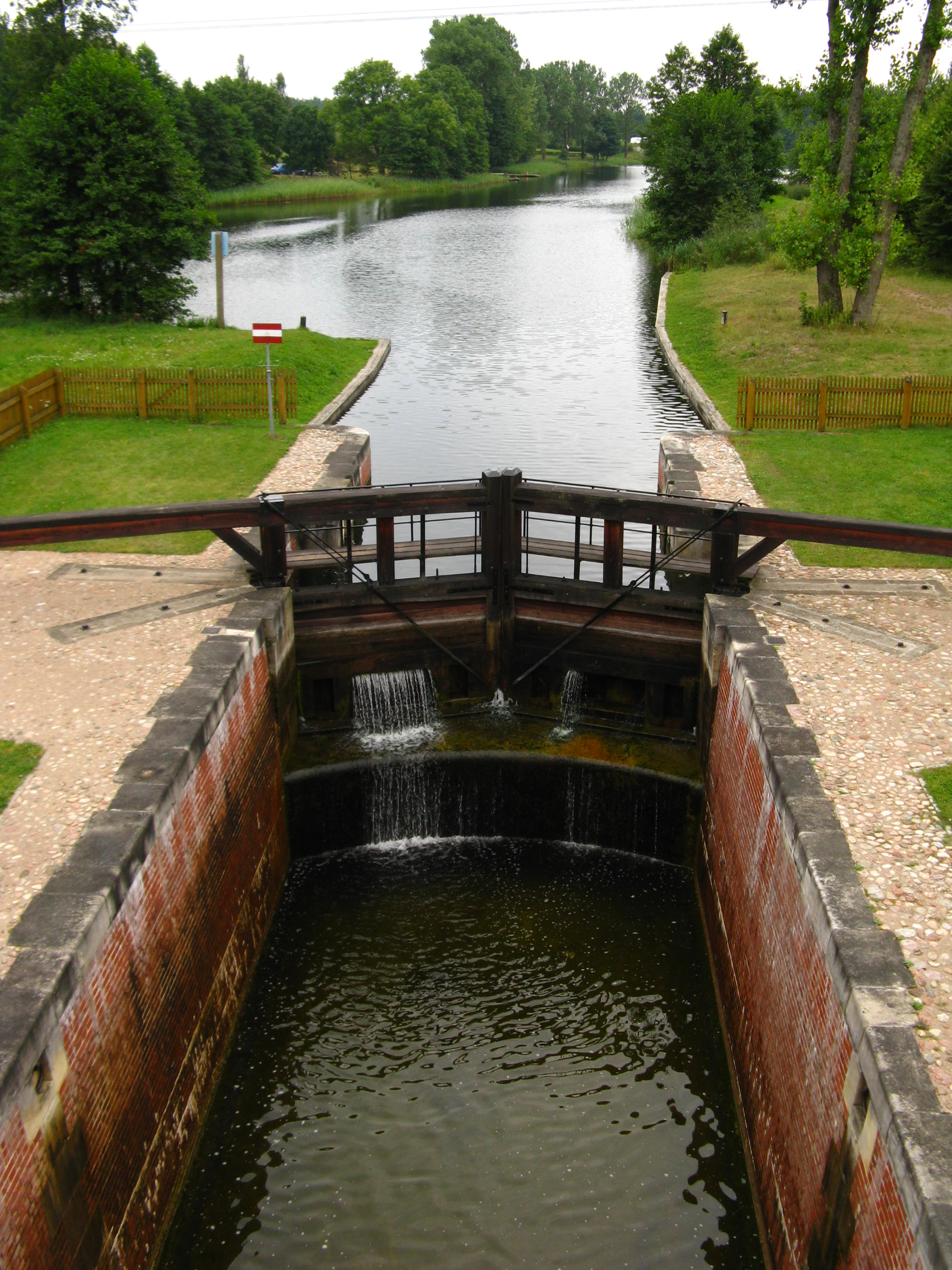
The Augustów Canal between Gorczyckie and Orle Lakes

=== Construction and operations (1821–1850) ===
The reasons behind the construction of the Augustów Canal were both political and economic. In 1821, Prussia introduced repressively high customs duties for transit of Russian Empire goods through its territory, in effect hindering access to their seaports for traders operating outside of Prussian territory. In 1822, the Kingdom of Poland was granted commercial autonomy from Russian Empire's customs area. The idea of Polish Minister of Economy, Franciszek Ksawery Drucki-Lubecki, was to make the new trade route independent of the Prussian seaport of Danzig (Gdańsk).

In August 1822, Drucki-Lubecki made the order of planning a waterway from Narew and Biebrza rivers to Neman river and then to the mouth of Windau river at the Baltic Sea. The field surveys to link the basins of the Neman and Vistula were begun with the permissions of the Russian Ministry of Communications in 1823. The Russian field party was led by lieutenant-colonel Reeze from the Corps of Transport Engineers and lieutenant-colonel Ignacy Prądzyński from the General Quartermasters' Office of the Polish Army. Reeze and Pradzynski met in Grodno on 28 June 1823. Lieutenant-colonel Pradzynski and four officers from the engineering corps carried out the topographical survey on Polish territory concentrating mainly on the lakes near to Augustow and the river Chorna Gancha. At the same time, the Reeze's group worked on the Biebrza river and the smaller rivers of Lososna, Tatarka and Polilia.

In the years 1823–1839 a waterway designed by General Ignacy Prądzyński, French General and engineer Jan Chrzciciel de Grandville Malletski and General Jan Paweł Lelewel was constructed, including buildings and hydraulic engineering structures, intended to bypass Prussian territory and link the center of the Kingdom of Poland with the Baltic seaport of Ventspils (Polish: Windawa). The building of the final "windawski" section of the waterway (Windawski Canal), which was to connect the new trading route to Ventspils, was relinquished due to unrest caused by the 1830–1831 November Uprising against Russia and revised trade agreements with Prussia.

=== Decline and abandonment (1850–1920) ===
During the latter half of the 19th century the rail network, such as nearby the Saint Petersburg–Warsaw Railway, started to replace the canal as the primary means of transporting goods. The channel gradually began to decline, from 1852 on it floated only forest products and from the mid-1860s the canal channel was scored.

=== Rebirth and destruction (1920–1945) ===
The First World War and the Polish-Soviet War caused some damage to the canal, but it was rebuilt by the Second Polish Republic during the early 1920s. Between the World Wars, the canal became a tourist attraction for the first time. It was a picturesque tourist route providing excellent sporting opportunities for canoeists, sailors and boaters. World War II saw the destruction of a number of locks and weirs of the canal. During the Second World War, German troops blew up three locks, about a dozen bridges and eight weirs. After World War II the Polish part of the canal has been restored.

=== Division and reconstruction (1950–2005) ===
The post-war redrawing of the eastern Polish border, see Curzon Line had a significant impact upon the canal. The Border Agreement between Poland and the USSR of 16 August 1945 drew a segment of the Polish-Belorussian SSR border along the axis of the Kurzyniec Lock and further along the axis of the canal for an additional 3.5 kilometres (2.2 miles). During the 1950s the People's Republic of Poland rebuilt the canal from the start on the Bezbra to Tartak Lock the remaining portion in Poland was left inactive after the damage incurred from World War II. The USSR performed no repairs on the portion of the canal within the Belorussian SSR. The Belarusian part of the canal since the partition has become a unique ecosystem, in 1970 the Sapotskinsky Biological Reserve was created to help preserve the area.

According to the decision of the Polish Minister of Culture and the Arts from 21 December 1968 the Augustów Canal on the section from Augustów to the state border with the infrastructure—locks, dams, bridges, housing banks, building maintenance services, environment, landscape and plant—was declared a monument of technology Class I. Then, on 9 Feb 1979, by the Voivode's decision the entire length of the Suwalki Augustów Canal was entered in the register of monuments.

=== Treasured status (2005 – present) ===
On 8 June 2005, based on Council of Ministers Resolution No. 125/2005 of 22 May 2005 concluded the "Agreement between the Government of the Polish Republic and the Government of the Republic of Belarus on the reconstruction of the Augustów Canal section of the border." The aim of the project was to restore the canal to operable condition for tourists, provide rational water management in the Czarna Hańcza river valley and restore the natural ecosystem of the waterway. Another event is the recognition of the Augustów Canal as a Monument of History — Regulation of the Polish President of 15 April 2007 (Dz. U. Nr 86 poz. 572). The canal is currently a conservation protection zone proposed by Poland and Belarus for inscription onto the World Heritage List of UNESCO.

== Geography ==
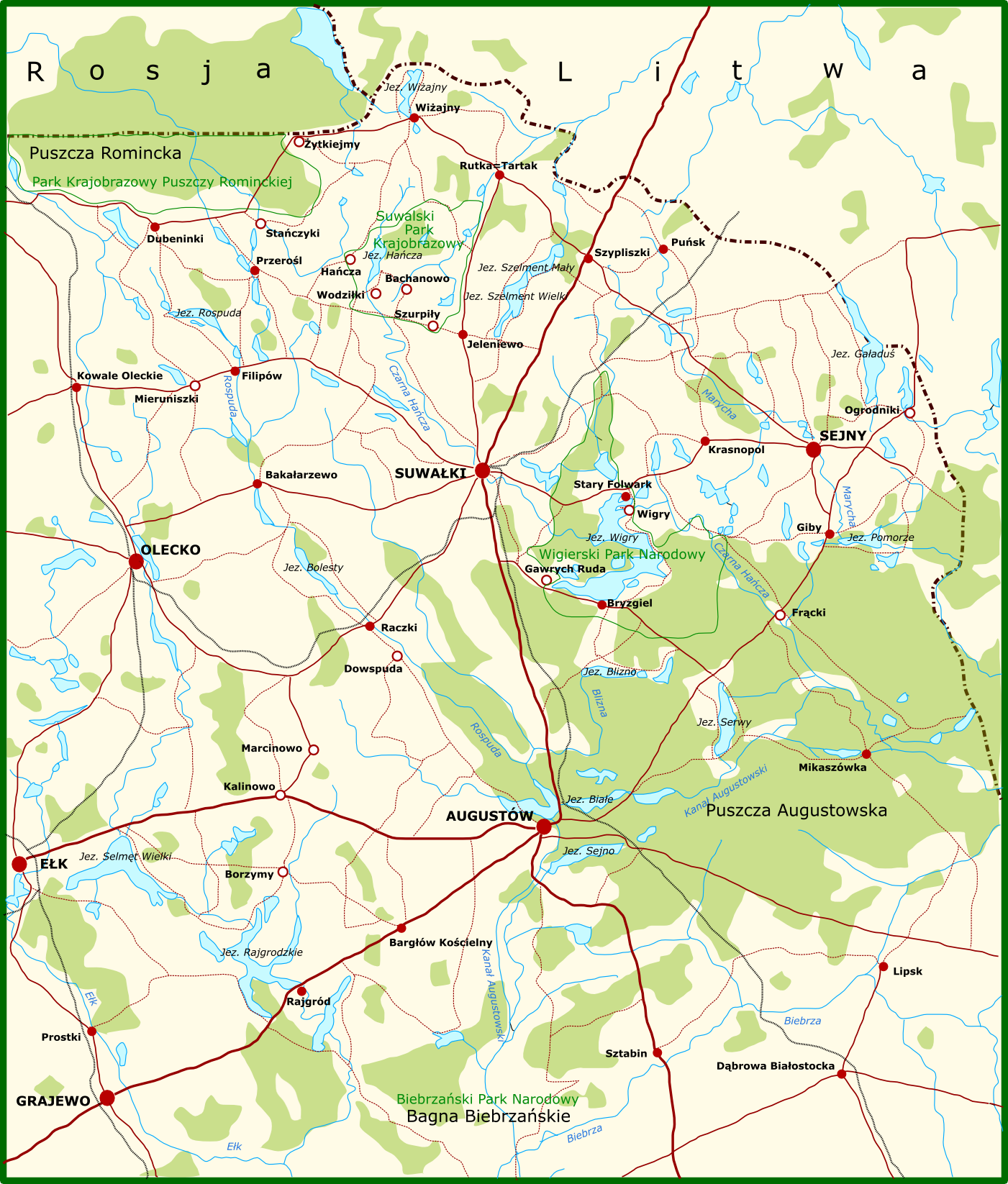
Augustów Canal is in the lower right of the map

The canal utilizes a postglacial depression and numerous valleys in the Masurian Lake District that were shaped by the Pleistocene ice age. Many of the surrounding hills are parts of moraines and many of its lakes are moraine-dammed lakes. It is based in the long natural chain of Augustów lakes and the adjoining rivers. The qualities of the landscape made it possible to perfectly integrate the canal with its environment over its 101.20 km length. The watershed area of the canal on the Polish side of the border is 74.25 km^{2} and on the Belarusian side, 8.42 km^{2} for a total of 82.67 km^{2}.

The canal connects seven natural moraine-dammed lakes: Necko, Białe, Studzieniczne, Orle, Paniewo, Krzywe and Mikaszewo; and 11 rivers: Biebrza, Netta, Czarna Hańcza, Klonownica, Plaska (Sucha Rzeczka, Serwianka), Mikaszówka, Perkucia, Szlamica, Wolkuszanka, Ostaszanka and Neman. The natural waterways are interconnected by cuttings and hydraulic installations with locks and weirs, including towpaths along the canal bank and a system of roads, bridges and buildings. A water reserve feeding the canal is provided from outside the buffer zone by the Sajno, Serwy and Wigry lakes, all within the boundaries of the protected area. Six historic sluices, Przewięź, Paniewo, Perkuć, Sosnówek, Tartak and Kudrynki, are easy to access from the green trail used by hikers and cyclists.

== Economics ==
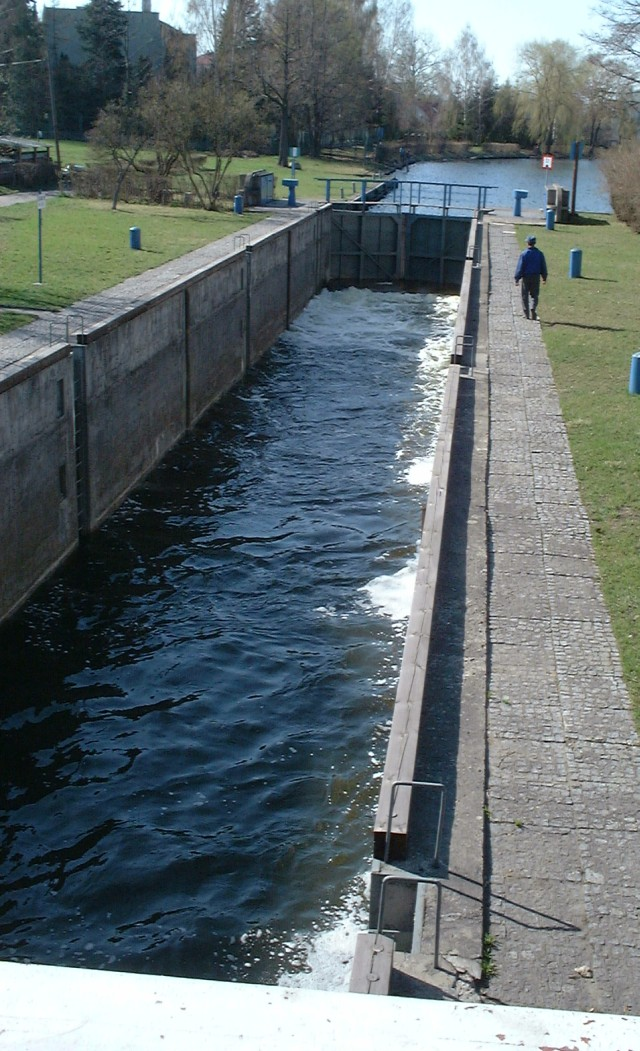
Augustów Lock is the fifth lock on the canal

The Augustów Canal remained, after completion, an inland waterway of local significance that was used for commercial shipping and to transport wood to and from the Vistula River and Neman River. The canal was used to transport the flour, salt, grain, chalk, gypsum, etc. In Augustów a large port was built in addition to a number of tow paths for horses to pull barges upstream. The canal was designed for the passage of vessels up to 40 m long, up to 5 m in width and capable of carrying up to 10 tons of cargo.

During the latter half of the 19th century the rail network, such as nearby the Saint Petersburg–Warsaw Railway, started to replace the canal as the primary means of transporting goods. The channel gradually began to decline, from 1852 on it floated only forest products and from the mid-1860s the canal channel was scored.

Starting in the late 1920s the canal became a tourist attraction for the first time. It was a picturesque tourist route providing excellent sporting opportunities for canoeists, sailors and boaters. After World War II the Polish part of the canal has been restored.

Currently the canal offers numerous sightseeing and tourist attractions. Its unsurpassed beauty comes from the natural qualities of the landscape with coniferous forests and lakes, especially around the Biebrza and Netta Rivers, and it runs through the Augustów Primeval Forest from west to east. The biggest attraction is to navigate the waterway in a kayak, canoe, fishing boat or a motorboat. It is also possible to visit part of the canal and the Augustów lakes in a passenger ship.

== Canal infrastructure ==
The Augustów Canal was the first summit level canal in Central Europe to provide a direct link between the two major rivers, Vistula River through the Biebrza River – a tributary of the Narew River, and the Neman River through its tributary – the Czarna Hańcza River, and it provided a link with the Black Sea to the south through the Oginski Canal, Daugava River, Berezina Canal and Dnieper River. From the time it was first built, the canal was described by experts as a technological marvel, with numerous sluices contributing to its aesthetic appeal.

The Augustów Canal, consisting of 18 locks and 22 sluices, is divided into two major sections: the West — from the merger of the Biebrza lock Augusta (0.0 – 32.50 km); and the East section — from lock to lock Niemnowo Augusta Belarus (32.50 – 101.20 km).

=== Vistula River watershed ===
Biebrza River to Augustów Lock (0.0 – 32.50 km)

Kilometer	Description	Coordinates
0.0	Start at the Biebrza River (84.2 km from the river source)	
0.35–10.95	Canalized Netta River	
0.35	Dębowo Lock and weir	53.609978°N 22.930051°E
10.95–32.50	Lateral canal parallel to the Netta River	
13.20	Sosnowo Lock. Weir to discharge excess water from the Sosnowo-Borki segment to the Netta River	53.700272°N 22.926201°E
19.25	Borki Lock	53.755095°N 22.915075°E
19.35	Weir to discharge excess water from the Borki-Białobrzegi segment to the Netta River	53.756433°N 22.915033°E
24.80	Weir to discharge excess water from the Borki-Białobrzegi segment to the Netta River	53.796686°N 22.945384°E
26.60	The canal passes through the village of Białobrzegi, Weir to discharge excess water from the Borki-Białobrzegi segment to the Netta River	53.804657°N 22.96637°E
27.10	Białobrzegi Lock	53.806976°N 22.968698°E
27.60	Weir to discharge excess water from the Białobrzegi-Augustów segment to Lake Sajno	
32.50	Augustów Lock and Augustów Weir. The weir controls the outflow from Lake Necko to Lake Sajna via the Bystry Canal (Polish: Kanał Bystry). The purpose is to establish a reserve water storage to supply the Augustów-Dębowo section of the canal.	53.841365°N 22.990948°E

=== Niemen river watershed ===
Augustów Lock to Neman River (32.50 km – 101.20 km)

Kilometer	Description	Coordinates
32.50–43.50	The canal crosses Lake Necko (1,7 km) and Lake Białe (6,7 km)	
43.50	Przewięź Lock	53.867143°N 23.092189°E
43.50–47.50	The canal crosses Lake Studzieniczne	
47.40	Swoboda Lock	53.866653°N 23.1451°E
47.40–57.00	Summit level canal with portions traversing Lake Swoboda and Lake Gorczyckie	
53.00	Connection to Lake Serwy	
57.00	Gorczyca Lock	53.90663°N 23.24726°E
57.00–60.90	artificial canal and traversal of Lake Orle and Lake Paniewo	
60.90	Paniewo Lock	53.898664°N 23.298331°E
63.00	Perkuć Lock	53.8991°N 23.318835°E
63.00–69.10	a short artificial canal and traversal of Lake Mikaszewo, near the village of Mikaszówka	
69.10	Mikaszówka Lock and Weir	53.889625°N 23.396562°E
70.30	Sosnówek Lock and Weir	53.891393°N 23.413226°E
70.50–94.60	Canalized Czarna Hańcza River	
74.40	Tartak Lock and Weir	53.882391°N 23.461454°E
77.40	Kudrynki Lock and Weir	53.878493°N 23.501558°E
80.00–83.40	The Poland-Belarus border runs along the axis of the canal for 3.4 kilometres (2.1 mi)	
81.75	Kurzyniec Lock and Weir. Site of the former village of Kurzyniec.	53.86364°N 23.523851°E
83.40	Wołkuszek Weir	
83.40–101.20	Segment of the canal in Belarus	
85.00	Wołkuszek Lock	
91.50	Dąbrówka Lock and Weir	53.862862°N 23.623599°E
94.60	The Czarna Hańcza River flows in a natural channel to the Neman River	
94.60–101.20	Lateral canal parallel to the Czarna Hańcza River	
100.00	Kurkul Weir to discharge excess water from the Dąbrówka-Niemnowo segment to the Neman River	
101.20	Niemnowo Lock	53.870561°N 23.756261°E
101.20	Neman River	53.870561°N 23.756261°E

== Recognition ==
The canal is currently a conservation protection zone proposed by Poland and Belarus for inscription onto the World Heritage List of UNESCO. This site was added to the UNESCO World Heritage Tentative List on 30 January 2004, in the Cultural category.

The canal was also named one of Poland's official national Historic Monuments (Pomnik historii), as designated 16 May 2007. Its listing is maintained by the National Heritage Board of Poland.
