= Bystry Canal =

Feeder canal in Augustów, Poland

Coordinates: 53°52′N 22°58′E

Bystry Canal Polish: Kanał Bystry
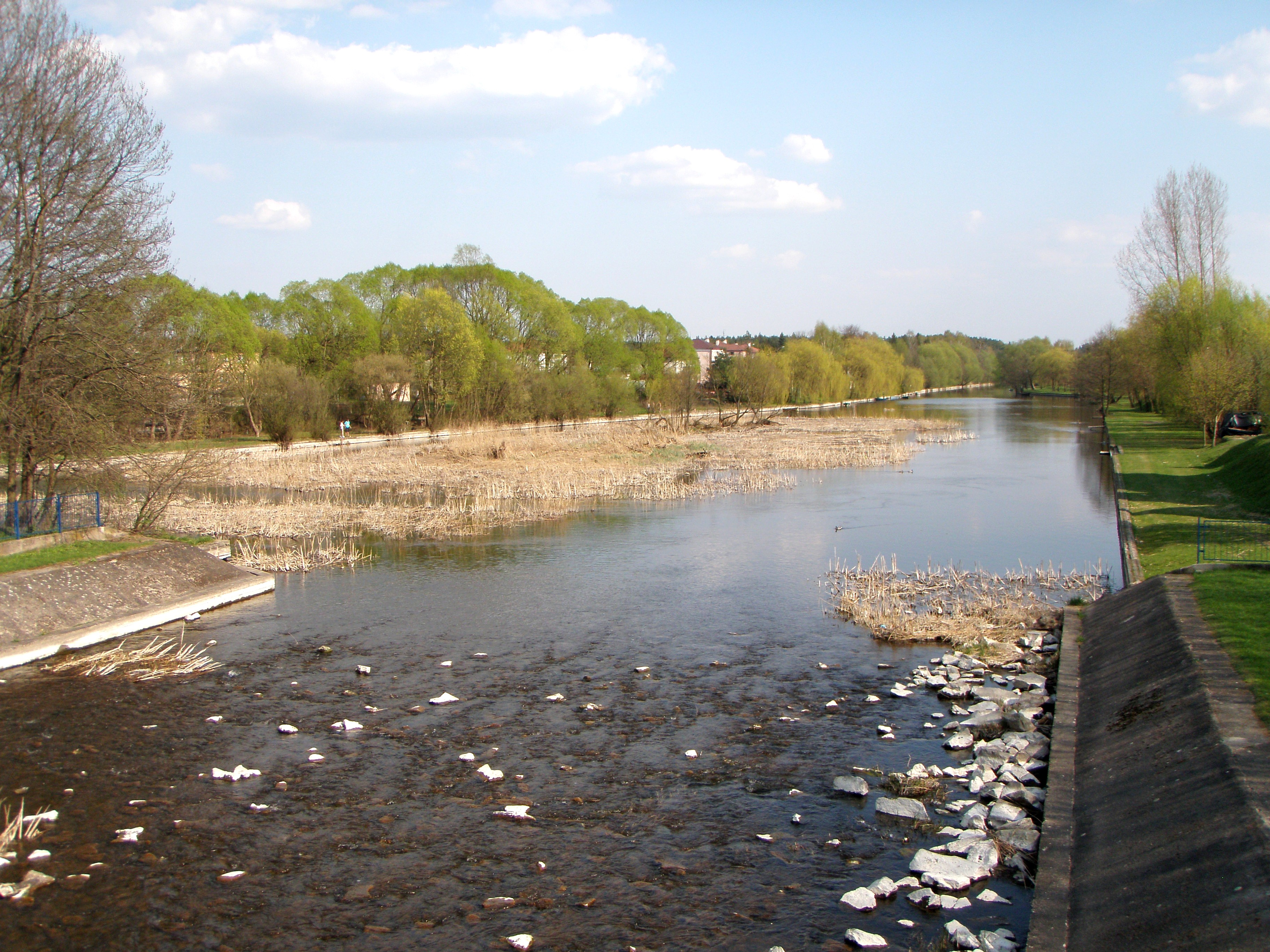
- Bystry Canal in Augustów
- Interactive map of Bystry Canal; Polish: Kanał Bystry

Specifications
- Length: 2 miles (3.2 km)
- Locks: (2 weir)
- Status: Open for recreational use
- Navigation authority: Regional Water Management Authority in Warsaw (RZGW Warsawa)

History
- Principal engineer: Ignacy Prądzyński
- Other engineer(s): Jan Chrzciciel de Grandville Malletski; Jan Paweł Lelewel
- Construction began: 1834
- Date completed: 1835

Geography
- Start point: Augustów Canal in Augustów, Poland
- End point: Sajno Lake near Augustów, Poland
- Connects to: Augustów Canal

The Bystry Canal (Polish: Kanał Bystry, [ˈkanau̯ bɘstrɘ]), is a feeder canal for the Augustów Canal which was built during the 19th century in the present-day Podlaskie Voivodeship of northeastern Poland (then the Augustów Voivodeship of the Kingdom of Poland).

== History ==
It was built in the years 1834–1835. The primary purpose was the draining of excess water from the Augustów Canal. The Bystry Canal is connected with the Netta River weir with a maximum flow of water: 95 m^{3} (3,400 cu ft) per second. The canal flows into the north side of the Sajno Lake. The canal is used as a trail for canoeing, and is sometimes frequented by anglers. On the banks are several species of aquatic birds like swans, ducks, grebes.

== Canal infrastructure ==
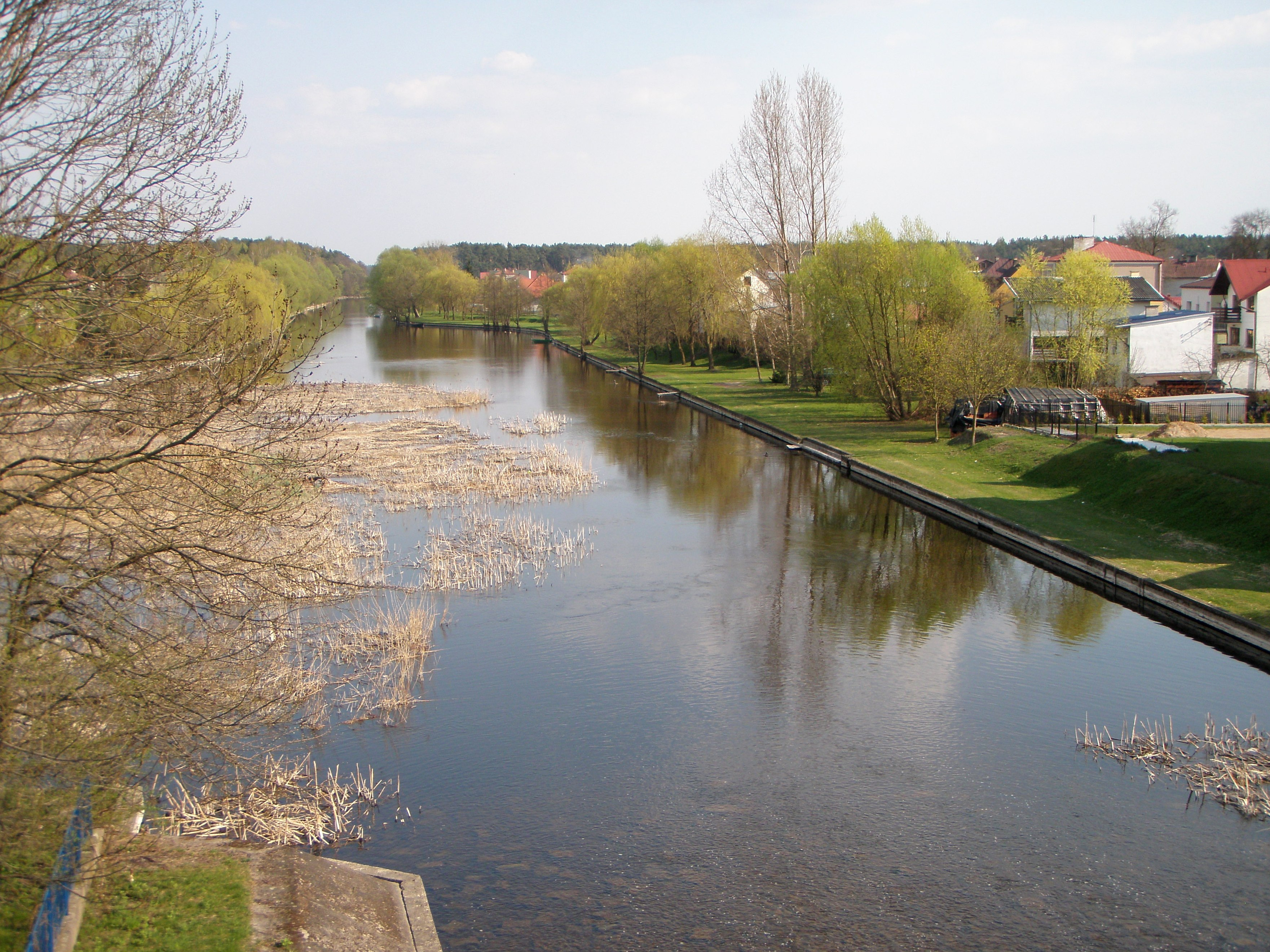
Bystry Canal in suburban area of Augustów

The canal is a fairly lively stream channel at the beginning. Just below the weir, and the bridge carrying 29 Listopada Street (National Road 8, National Road 16, and European route E67) over the canal, it is a series of shoals and rocks with a width of approximately 40 m (130 ft). A street named after Ludwik Waryński, an activist and theoretician of the socialist movement in Poland, runs along the right bank of the canal. There are a number of houses along the edge of the water with a number of small private docks for boats and for fishing.

After 200 m (660 ft) the channel becomes deeper, 50 to 60 cm (20 to 24 in), and changes from an urban character to a suburban character, especially after reaching on both sides of the spruce forest. At the 1 km (0.62 mi) mark the canal crosses under Bohaterów Westerplatte Street (Voivodeship Road 664) which runs from Augustów south-east towards the Belarus border near Hrodna, Belarus.

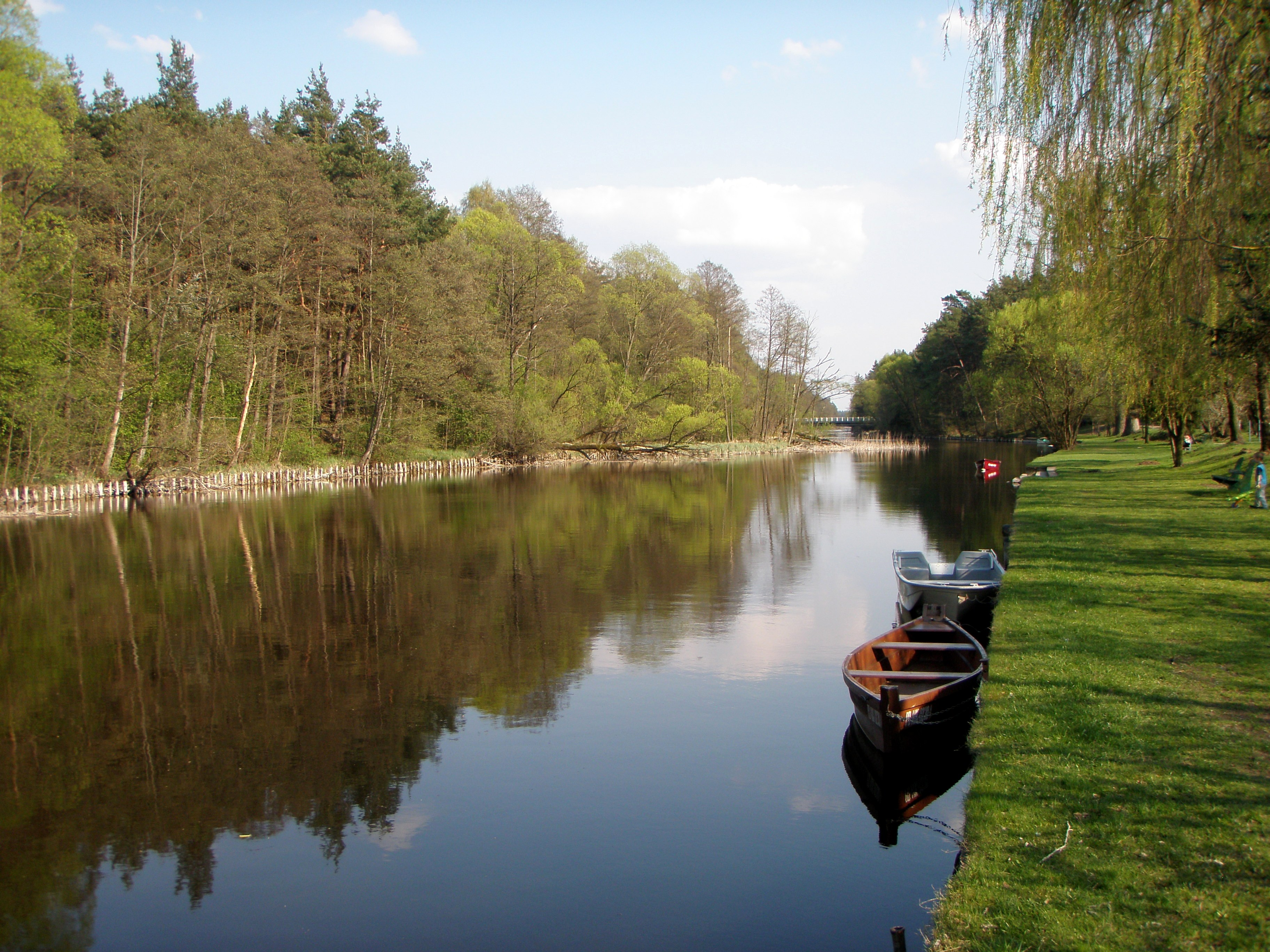
Bystry Canal in forested area near Augustów

Next the canal passes through a forested area of spruce, pine and occasionally rising just above the water alders and willows. Here and there on the edges, especially on the left, on the bank of a dry, comfortable place to rest and camping.

The 2 km (1.2 mi) mark on the canal is the canal estuary Sajno Lake with the shore of the lake among the reeds.

At the end of the canal the banks are quite high, accessible, with places to rest. At the mouth of the right there is a dock for fishing boats.
