= Mikaszówka =

- Village
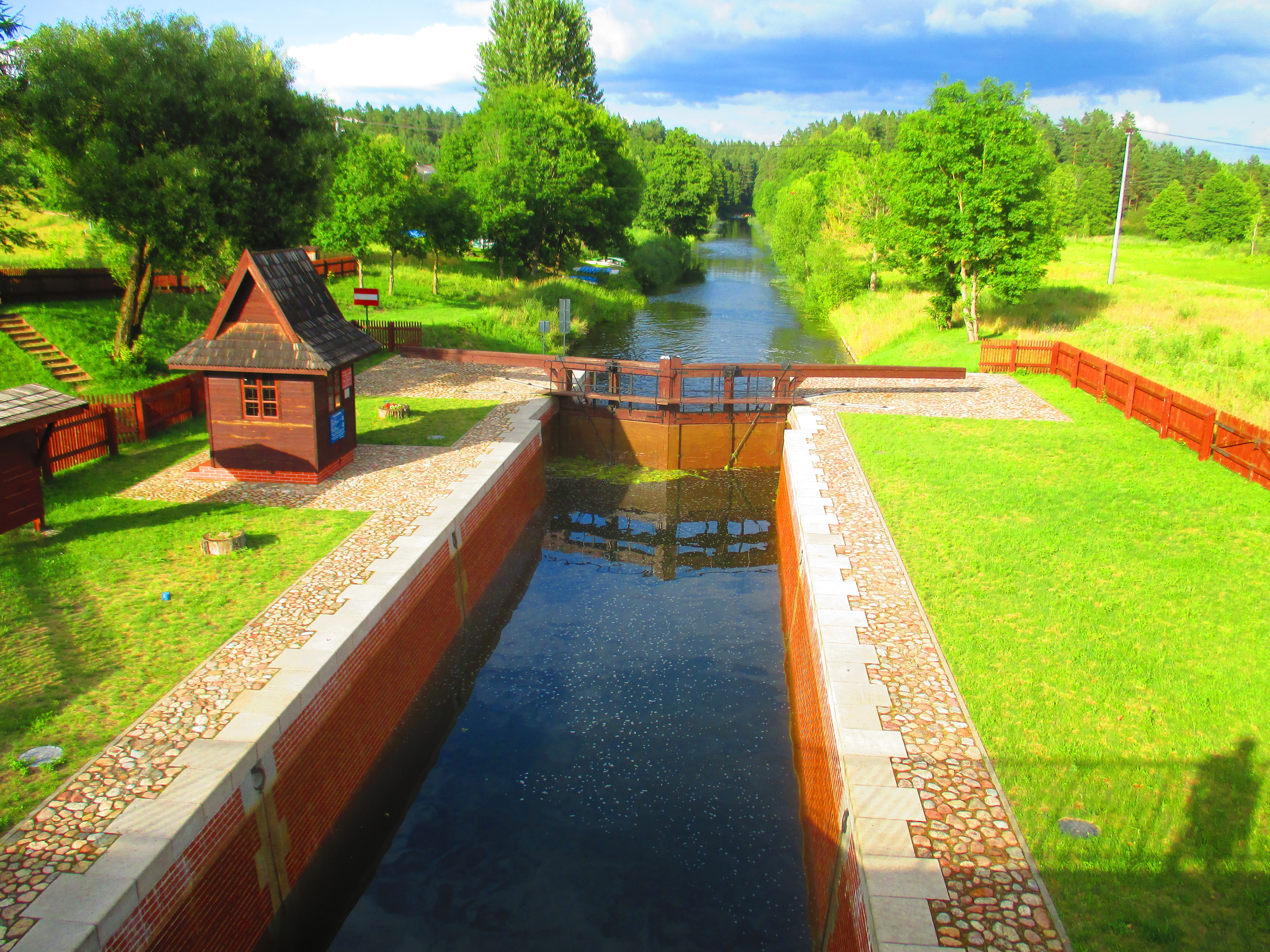
- Mikaszówka Lock on the Augustów Canal in Mikaszówka

- Location within Poland
- Coordinates: 53°53′26″N 23°23′44″E
- Country: Poland
- Voivodeship: Podlaskie
- County: Augustów
- Gmina: Płaska
- Population: 90
- Time zone: UTC+1 (CET)
  - Summer (DST): UTC+2 (CEST)
- Vehicle registration: BAU

Mikaszówka [mikaˈʂufka] is a village in the administrative district of Gmina Płaska, within Augustów County, Podlaskie Voivodeship, in north-eastern Poland, close to the border with Belarus. The Mikaszówka Lock of the Augustów Canal is located in Mikaszówka.

== History ==
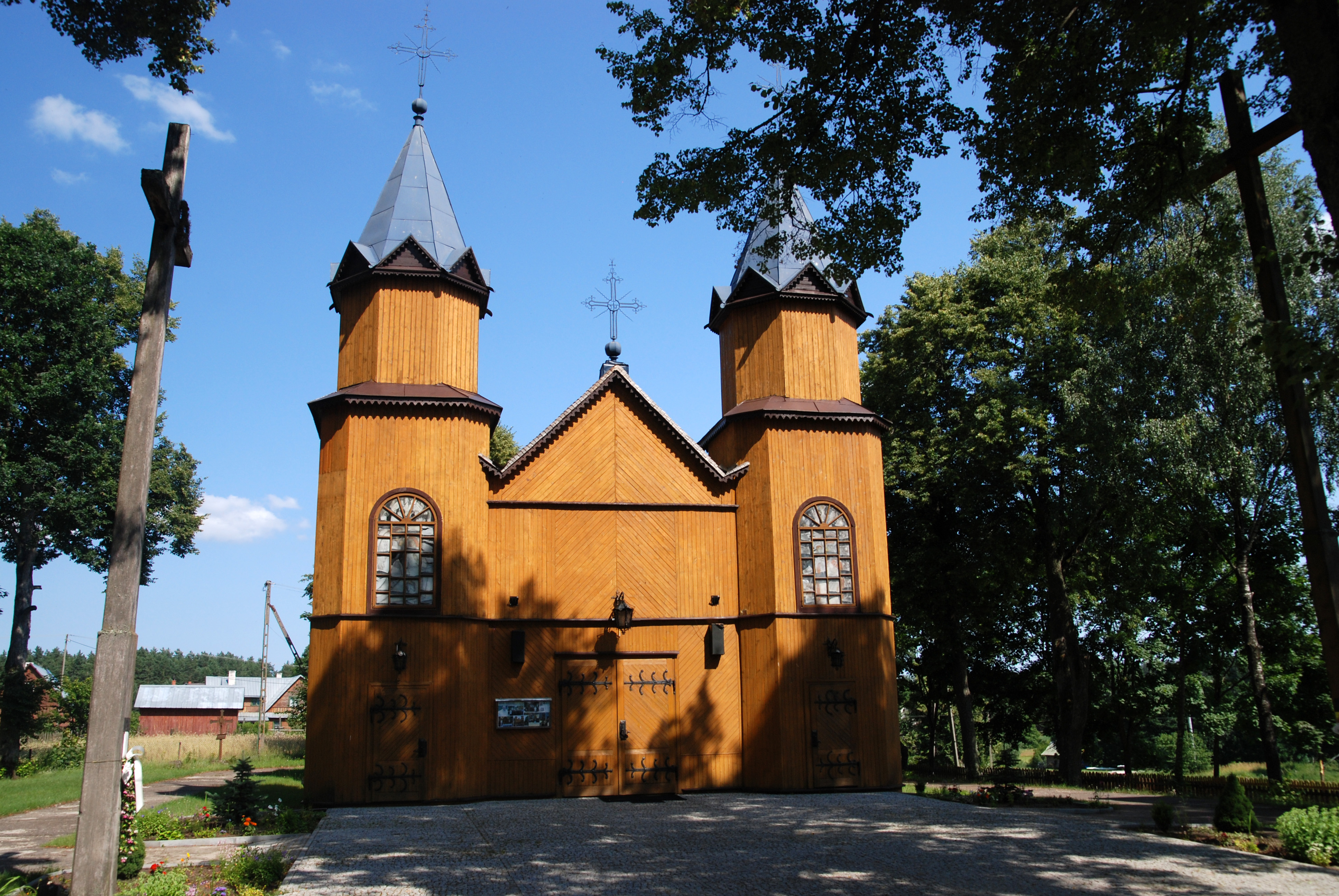
Old wooden Church of Mary Magdalene

In 1827, Mikaszówka had a population of 95, and in the late 19th century it had a population of 128.

During the German occupation of Poland (World War II), in April 1940, the Germans arrested Polish priests Stanisław Piotr Konstantynowicz and Stanisław Maciątek in the village, and then imprisoned them in Suwałki and eventually deported them to concentration camps. Maciątek died of exhaustion in the Sachsenhausen concentration camp in June 1940, while Konstantynowicz was murdered in the Hartheim Euthanasia Centre in August 1942 (see Nazi crimes against the Polish nation).
