= Hańcza =

Deepest lake in Poland

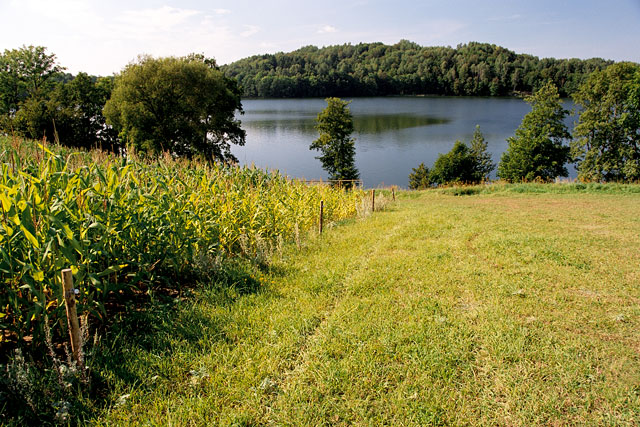
- August 2004

- Location within Poland Location within Podlaskie Voivodeship
- Location: Suwałki Region
- Coordinates: 54°16′N 22°49′E
- Basin countries: Poland
- Max. length: 4.5 km (2.8 mi)
- Max. width: 1.2 km (0.75 mi)
- Surface area: 311.4 ha (769 acres)
- Max. depth: 108.5 m (356 ft)

Hańcza (Polish: [ˈxaɲ.t͡ʂa]; Lithuanian: Ančia) is a lake in Suwałki Region, Podlaskie Voivodeship, Poland. It is 311.4 ha large, 4.5 km long and 1.2 km at its widest. It is the deepest lake in Poland with a maximum depth of 108.5 m. The Czarna Hańcza river flows through it.

== Geology ==
Lake Hańcza, situated in the Suwałki region of northeastern Poland, is renowned not only for its depth (the deepest lake in Poland, reaching a maximum depth of approximately 108.5 meters) but also for its unique geological and limnological features. Geological analysis of this lake allows for an understanding of the processes that have shaped its current form and the structure of its substrata.

Terrain Formation and Lake Genesis

Glacial Origin

Lake Hańcza was formed as a result of glacial activity during the Pleistocene epoch. Like many post-glacial lakes, Lake Hańcza owes its existence to the last Baltic glaciation. Melting ice left behind various landforms, including glacial troughs, which filled with water, creating lakes.

Subglacial Channel

Lake Hańcza is an example of a ribbon lake, formed by the erosive activity of subglacial waters. These waters flowed under immense pressure beneath the ice sheet, carving deep channels into the substrate. These channels later filled with water, forming present-day lakes. Hańcza has a characteristic elongated shape, typical of ribbon lakes, indicating its glacial origin.

Stratigraphy and Lithology of the Region

The geological structure of the Suwałki region, including the area of Lake Hańcza, is complex and encompasses layers ranging from the Precambrian to the Quaternary. The region is predominantly composed of metamorphic and igneous rocks, particularly in the northern part, where gneisses and granites are found.

The substrate of Lake Hańcza mainly consists of glacial deposits: till, sands, gravels, and silts. Numerous glacial erratics, brought by the glacier from distant regions of Scandinavia, can be found on its floor.

Morphology of the Lake Bed

Lake Bed

The bottom of Lake Hańcza is characterized by a complex morphology, resulting from various sedimentary and erosive processes. The deepest parts of the lake feature steep slopes, which may indicate landslide activity. The lake bed also contains structures formed by glacial activity, such as drumlins and kames.

Sedimentary Processes

Sedimentation in Lake Hańcza is a dynamic process. Organic sediments, primarily derived from fallen leaves and plant matter, as well as mineral sediments carried by surface waters, accumulate on the lake bed. In the central part of the lake, sediments are finer-grained, indicating calmer deposition conditions.
