= Czarna Hańcza =

Czarna Hańcza Чорная Ганча
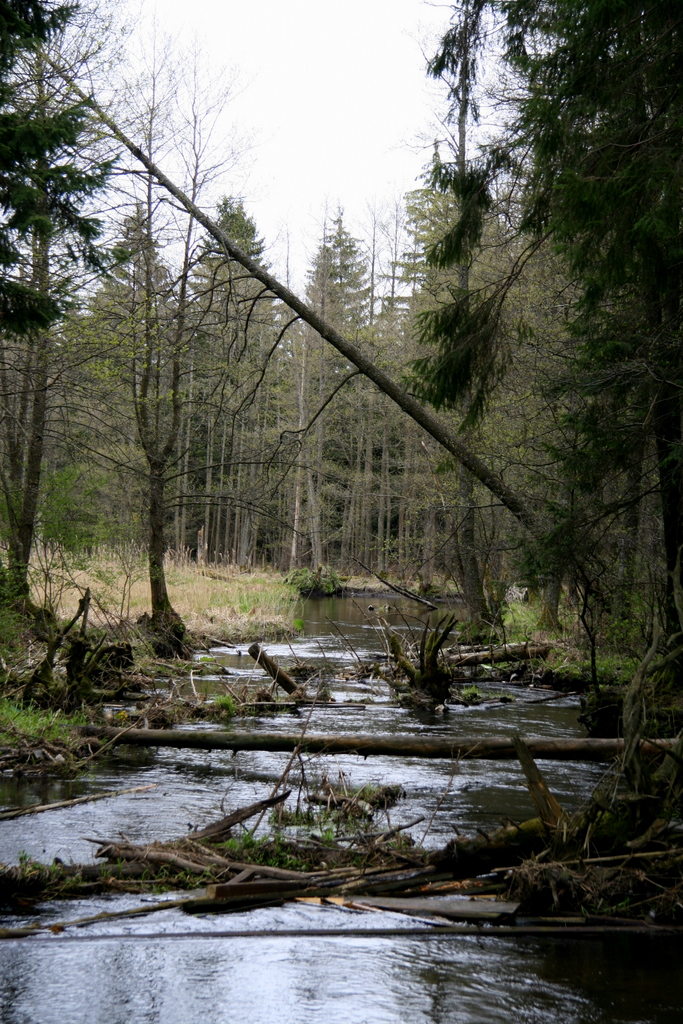

Location
- Country: Poland, Belarus

Physical characteristics
- Mouth
  - location: Neman
  - coordinates: 53°54′1″N 23°47′5″E

Basin features
- Progression: Neman→ Baltic Sea

The Czarna Hańcza, Chornaya Hancha (Belarusian: Чорная Ганча) is the largest river of the Suwałki Region of north-eastern Poland and the Sapockin region of north-western Belarus. It is known for having large postglacial boulders. Originating near Lake Hańcza (the deepest lake in Poland with a maximum depth of 108.5 m) and flowing through lake Hańcza and Wigry Lake (the location of Wigry National Park), the Czarna Hańcza is a tributary of the river Neman beyond the borders of Belarus and Lithuania. It flows through the city of Suwałki.

== See also ==
- Augustów Canal
- Biała Hańcza
