= Białobrzegi, Podlaskie Voivodeship =

Białobrzegi
- Village
- Location within Poland
- Coordinates: 53°48′9″N 22°58′8″E
- Country: Poland
- Voivodeship: Podlaskie
- County: Augustów
- Gmina: Augustów
- Elevation: 121 m (397 ft)
- Population: 330

Białobrzegi [bʲawɔˈbʐɛɡʲi] is a village in the administrative district of Gmina Augustów, within Augustów County, Podlaskie Voivodeship, in north-eastern Poland.
