= Biebrza =

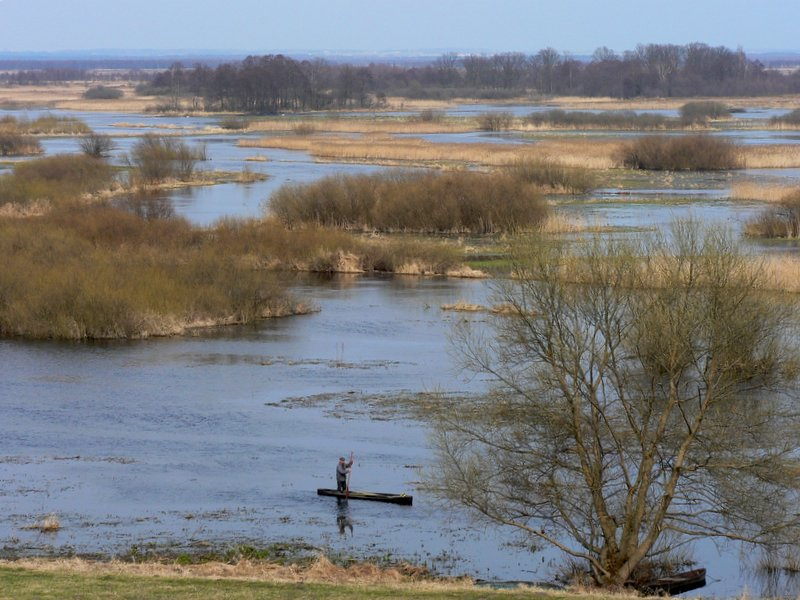
- The Biebrza in Burzyn

Location
- Country: Poland

Physical characteristics
- Mouth
  - location: Narew
  - coordinates: 53°13′02″N 22°25′52″E
- Length: 164 km (102 mi)
- Basin size: 7,092 km^{2} (2,738 sq mi)
- Discharge
  - average: 35.3 m^{3}/s (1,250 cu ft/s)

Basin features
- Progression: Narew→ Vistula→ Baltic Sea

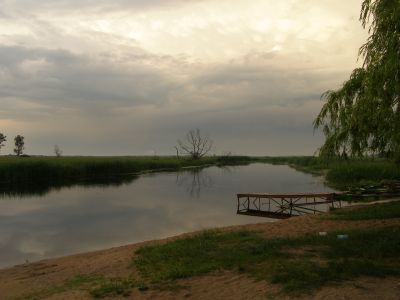
The Biebrza in Goniądz

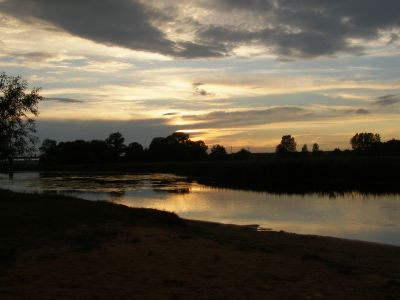
The Biebrza at sunset

The Biebrza (Lithuanian: Bebra, Belarusian: Bobra, German: Bober) is a river in northeastern Poland, a tributary of the Narew River (near Wizna), with a length of 164 kilometers (102 mi) and a basin area of 7,092 km^{2} (7,067 in Poland).

Larger towns in the area:

- Lipsk
- Sztabin
- Goniądz
- Osowiec-Twierdza
- Radzilow
- Wizna

The region is usually divided into lower, central, and upper basin areas, each with its own different characteristics.

== Major tributaries ==
- Right tributaries: Netta, Lega, Ełk, Wissa
- Left tributaries: Sidra (river), Brzozówka

== Natural environment ==
Today, the river is best known for the vivid wildlife in the peatbogs and marshes in its flood areas.

== History ==
Historically, the borderland regions of Mazovia and Lithuania, the area retains much of its cultural diversity today.

== Cultural and linguistic environment ==
The basin of the Biebrza River is inhabited not only by hundreds of rare and endangered sorts of birds, but also by people representing diverse cultures, languages, and religions. Although most of the population of the region speaks standard Polish, some people in the upper river basin (municipalities of Lipsk, Dąbrowa Białostocka and partly Sztabin) speak a local dialect of Belarusian (called by them prosty jazyk 'simple language'). The people there belong to the Orthodox or Roman Catholic church. On the north bank of the upper Biebrza there are also a few villages where so-called "old believers" live, who speak an archaic dialect of Russian. Some of these communities have preserved much of their traditional culture in spite of long-lasting communist government policies aimed at assimilation of non-Polish cultural and linguistic minorities.

== See also ==
- Biebrza National Park
- Augustów Canal
- Rivers of Poland

== Sources ==
- VLKK (2002). "Atvirkštinis lietuvių kalboje vartojamų tradicinių Lenkijos vietovardžių formų sąrašas" (PDF). VLKK (in Lithuanian). Archived from the original (PDF) on 2012-02-14.
