= Augustów Primeval Forest =

Old-growth forest in Lithuania, Belarus & Poland

Coordinates: 53.889773°N 23.344574°E

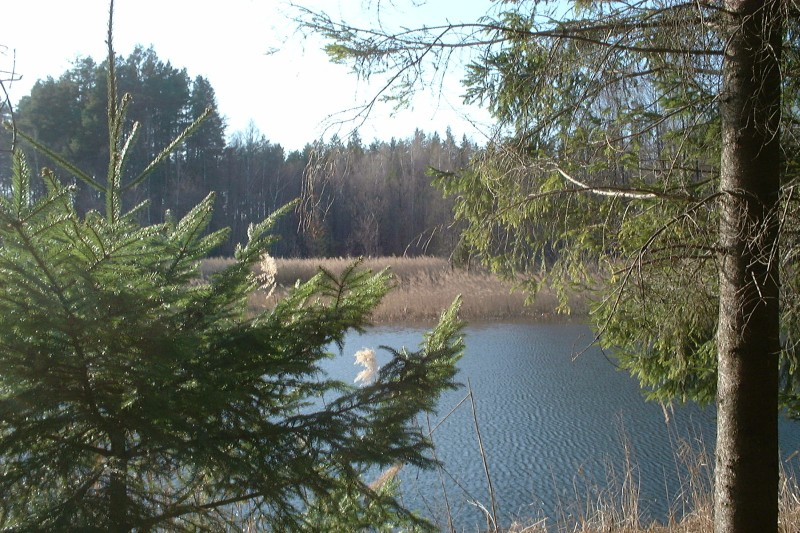
Perkuć nature reserve in Augustów Primeval Forest

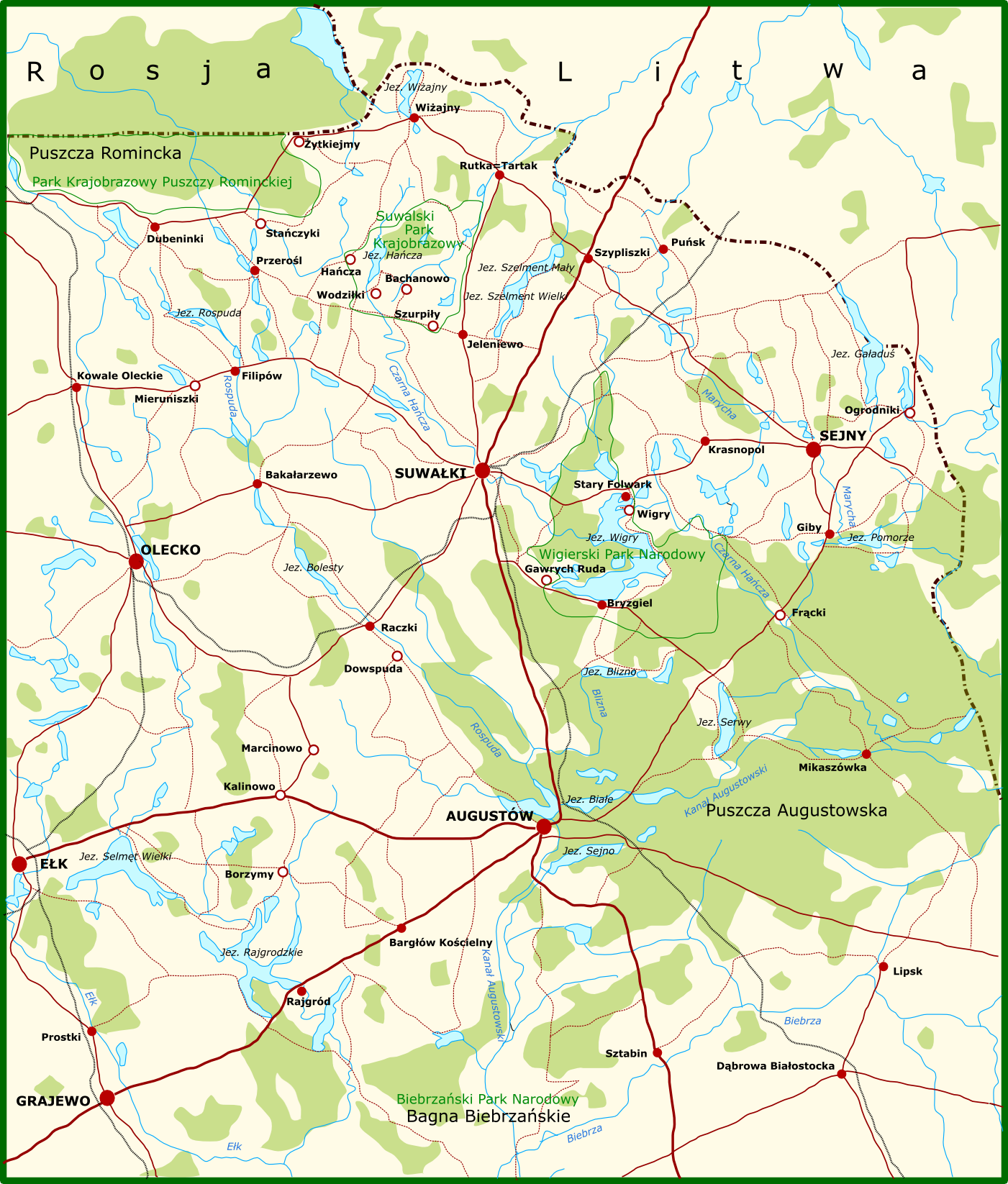
A map of Suwalszczyzna with Puszcza Augustowska to the east

Augustów Primeval Forest or Augustów Forest (Polish: Puszcza Augustowska, Lithuanian: Augustavo giria, Belarusian: Аўгустоўская пушча) is a large virgin forest complex located in Poland, as well as in northern Belarus and southeastern Lithuania. The forest covers about 1,600 square kilometres (400,000 acres), of which 1,140 square kilometres (280,000 acres) are in Poland.

The Polish part of the forest is located in Podlaskie Voivodeship, in the northeastern part of the country. The northern part of the Augustów Primeval Forest has been turned into one of the youngest Polish national parks. It was established in 1989, as the Wigry National Park.

== History ==
The forest has formerly been called Grodno Forest and Perstunskaya Forest. It once occupied the territory from Grodno in the southeast to the Baltic Sea in the north.

In the past, the Augustów Primeval Forest was part of vast, virgin forests growing between Lithuania, Mazovia and Ruthenia. Until the thirteenth century, its area was inhabited by the Yotvingians. After their extermination or displacement, the re-settlement of the forest began only in the 15th century. Then the forests were divided into the so-called primeval forests, that is forestry: Perstuńska, Przełomska, Berżnicka and others. In the mid-sixteenth century, they were part of the royal property and were the hunting grounds for various animals: aurochs, bison, elk, deer, wild boar, bears and wolves. The forest was owned by the Grand Duke. He could endow the boyar with a piece of forest, allowing him to create settlements there and to engage in agriculture.

It was then that the forest began to be exploited: trees were cut and then floated down the rivers to the Baltic ports. They produced potash, tar and charcoal, smelt iron from bog iron ore, and collected honey from beehives. At that time, Osock villages were established on the southern edge of the forest – the so-called osocznicy, or guardians of the royal forest. Mostly, they were peasants, released from serfdom, whose function was transferred from father to son – this is how, among others, the villages of Starożyńce (Starożyńce family), Markowce (Markowicz), Skieblewo and Kurianka (Kurianowicz). Over time, they were gradually transformed into ordinary serfs, with the exception of the Forest Heroes, in which Bohatyrowiczs from the minor nobility were imprisoned, serving until the partitions. The emigrants from the village of Żabickie, who were responsible for transporting the forest management correspondence, performed their duties for a similar time. Permanent settlements of beekeepers, scythes, fishermen and osaczników, dating back to the 15th century, were the oldest settlements at the beginning of colonization of the area of today's Augustów Primeval Forest.

Beekeepers were also settled here, guarding the royal hives; this is how the villages of Bartniki and Rakowicze were created. Honey-hunting entries have been recorded since the 15th century near Tobołów, in the Mołowiste wilderness on Lake Serwy, in Sarnetki, Chrołowszczyzna on the Szczebra River. Bartenders had the right to use only honey trees, which led to disputes with forest officials and owners and made management difficult. Private forests and honey-hunting meadows survived until the 19th century, when they began to be bought. However, beekeeping began to decline in earlier centuries as the forest was populated. One of the privileges of honey hunters was the right to bring axes and other tools to the forest, a privilege which was deprived of other groups of the population.

During the January Uprising, the backwoods were a refuge for combatants and a place of skirmishes. In the Kozi Rynek reserve are the graves of insurgents who died in battle with the majority of Imperial Russian Army on June 29, 1863. In the Powstańce forest wilderness (north of Augustów), in April 1863, an insurgent forge operated; today a monument stands there.

During World War I, the forest was badly damaged due to the destruction of trees by the Germans (about 15% of the forests were cut down).

During World War II, the forest again served as a shelter for partisans. It was also a place of execution of the population as in the vicinity of the village of Szczebra in the years 1941–1944 about 8,000 people, mainly Jews, were murdered.

In the direction of the forest was the Slavic colonization of land. Already at the beginning of the 16th century, Ruthenian settlements appeared in the vicinity of the forest, located in the area of the Prussian border. However, the Ruthenian enclaves did not exist there for long and disappeared after the devastating wars of the 17th–18th centuries.

As the Grodno Forest was cut down and removed from Grodno, the forest became known as the Perstunsky Forest. The name is associated with the area of Crank, which was the administrative center of the local grand duchy. During the 1863 uprising, many rebels were stationed in the forest. In the Kozi Rinek Reserve there is a rebel cemetery for those killed in the fight against the armies of the Russian Empire on June 29, 1863. At present, north of Augustow is a monument to these fighters. According to the July 12, 1920 peace agreement between Lithuania and Soviet Russia was assigned to the Republic of Lithuania.

== See also ==
- Augustów
- Augustów Canal

== Bibliography ==
- Suwalszczyzna, homepage
- Puszcza Augustowska, ATIKART, Białystok, ISBN 83-902550-0-6
