= Second Battle of the Masurian Lakes =

Battle in 1915 during the First World War on the Eastern front

Coordinates: 54.0000°N 22.0000°E

- Part of the Eastern Front during World War I
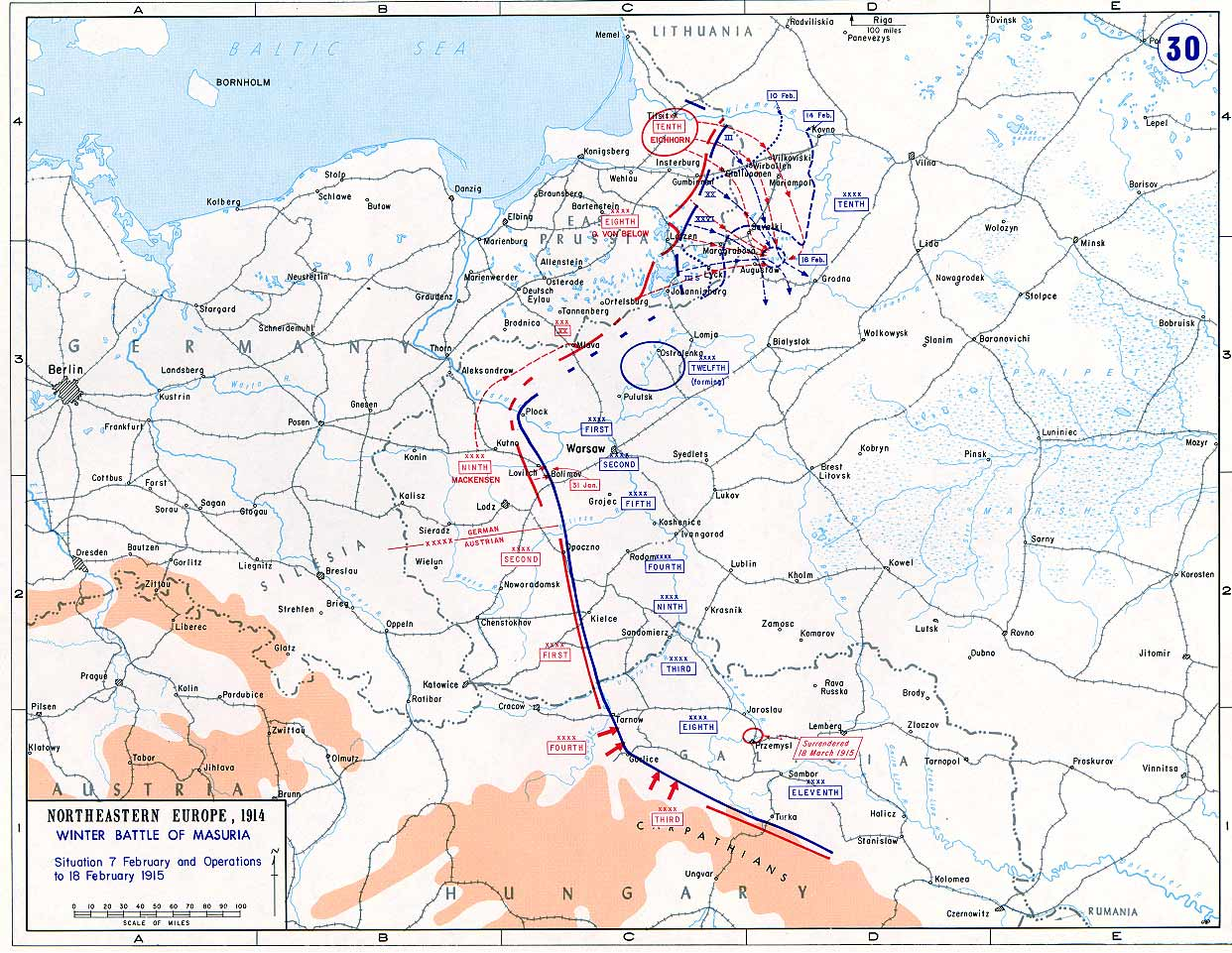
- Eastern Front, February 7–18, 1915
Date	7–28 February 1915
Location	East Prussia, German Empire (present-day Poland)
Result	German victory
Territorial changes	Russian forces evacuate East Prussia

Belligerents
Germany	Russia

Commanders and leaders
(German Empire) Paul von Hindenburg (German Empire) Erich Ludendorff (German Empire) Max Hoffmann (German Empire) Otto von Below (German Empire) Hermann von Eichhorn (German Empire) Georg von der Marwitz	Nikolai Ruzsky; Thadeus von Sievers; Pavel Plehve

Units involved
(German Empire) 8th Army (German Empire) 10th Army	10th Army; 12th Army

Strength
250,000 to 275,261; 400 machine guns 1082 guns	Total: at least 461,364 men 10th Army: 428,897 men 355 machine guns 617 guns 15th Army Corps; 32,467 men 64 machine guns 104 guns 2nd Army Corps: unknown men

Casualties and losses
20,000 to 31,827	official Russian medical reports: Total 135,189 (including 80,500 prisoners); 7,402 KIA; 25,946 WIA; 101,841 MIA; Lost: 136 machine guns 323 guns

The Second Battle of the Masurian Lakes or Winter Battle of the Masurian Lakes, known in Germany as the Winter Battle in Masuria and in Russia as the Battle of Augustowo, was the northern part of the Central Powers' offensive on the Eastern Front in the winter of 1915 during World War I. The offensive was intended to advance beyond the Vistula River and potentially knock Russia out of the war. It was the last major battle fought on German soil during World War I.

== Background ==
The Central Powers planned four offensives on their Eastern Front in early 1915. The Germans, led by Supreme Commander of All German Forces in the East Paul von Hindenburg, would attack eastward from their front line in western Poland, which had been occupied after the Battle of Łódź in 1914, toward the Vistula River and also in East Prussia in the vicinity of the Masurian Lakes, site of the 1914 Battle of the Masurian Lakes. The Austro-Hungarians would emerge from the Carpathian Mountain passes to attack the Russians by driving toward Lemberg. They would be led by General Alexander von Linsingen. Further south General Borojevic von Bojna would attempt to relieve the besieged fortress at Przemyśl.

According to Prit Buttar, "It was with considerable reluctance that Falkenhayn agreed to the deployment of four additional corps on the Eastern Front in early 1915. Whilst he remained convinced of the primacy of the Western Front, the failure to win a decisive victory there left him unable to counter the arguments of Hindenburg and Ludendorff ... might be able to inflict a sufficiently heavy defeat upon Russia to end the conflict in the east."

Ludendorff wrote, "It was agreed with OHL to use the four corps to strike against the enemy forces deployed against 8th Army as soon as they arrived. The experiences of Tannenberg and the Battle of the Masurian Lakes had shown that a great and swift victory in battle could be achieved if the enemy were attacked from two sides." Ludendorff's target for the German attack was the Russian 10th Army, with a northern thrust from Tilsit through Wladislawow to Kalvarija, and a southern thrust from the Spirding-See near Bialla to Raigrod and then to Augustowo. The Russians were to be held in position by a frontal attack, and if successful, Ludendorff planned further attacks on Osowiec and Grodno.

The German northern thrust was to be made by the newly formed 10th Army, under the command of Eichhorn, with the XXI Corps, XXXIX Reserve Corps, and XXXVIII Reserve Corps deployed from the Niemen River to Insterburg. Landwehr formations were held in reserve. The German southern thrust was to be made by Below's 8th Army, with the XL Reserve Corps deployed west of Johannisburg, and the XX Corps at Ortelsburg. The Russian 10th Army consisted of the 3rd Army Corps opposite Eichhorn, and the 3rd Siberian Army Corps opposite Below, while the 20th and 26th Army Corps held the centre.

== Battle ==
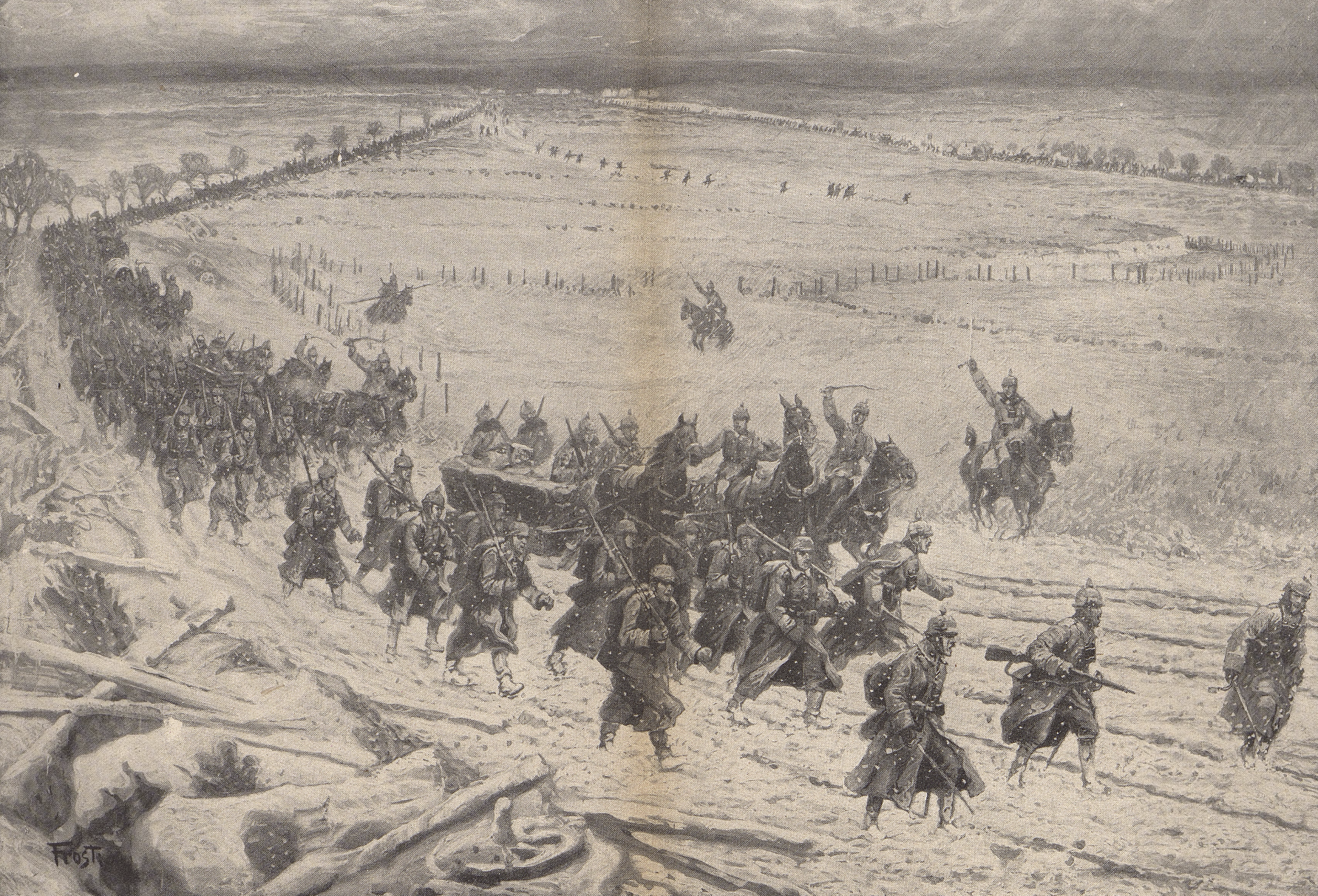
Winter fighting in Masuria: German infantry marching, illustration by M. Frost

Chief of the German Great General Staff Erich von Falkenhayn strongly believed that the war would be won on the Western Front. Nonetheless, he sent four additional army corps to Paul von Hindenburg, Supreme Commander of All German Forces in the East. By February 1915, thirty-six percent of the German field army was in the east.

The German 9th Army attacked from Silesia into Poland at the end of January. They released tear gas, which stopped their assault by blowing back on the attackers. The Russians counterattacked with eleven divisions under a single corps commander, losing 40,000 men in three days.

In East Prussia, further Russian incursions were blocked by trench lines extending between the Masurian Lakes; they were held by the German 8th Army, commanded by General Otto von Below. The 8th Army was reinforced by some of the newly arrived corps, while the rest of them became the German 10th Army, commanded by Colonel-General Hermann von Eichhorn, which was formed on the German left. The 10th Army was to be one wing of a pincers intended to surround their opponents: General Sievers' Russian 10th Army. A new Russian 12th Army under General Pavel Plehve was assembling in Poland roughly 100 km (62 mi) to the southwest.

Sievers warned the Northwest Front commander, General Nikolai Ruzsky, that they were likely to be attacked, but was ignored. On February 7, despite a heavy snowstorm, the left wing of Below's 8th Army launched a surprise attack against Sievers, whose trenches were shallow, disconnected ditches, with little or no barbed wire because the first shipments had not arrived until December 1914. The following day, the German 10th Army also drove forward. Snow, with drifts as high as a man, slowed German progress down the roads for the first two days; off the roads, the ground was too boggy for fighting. Despite these formidable obstacles, the German pincers advanced 120 km (75 mi) in a week, inflicting severe casualties on the Russians.

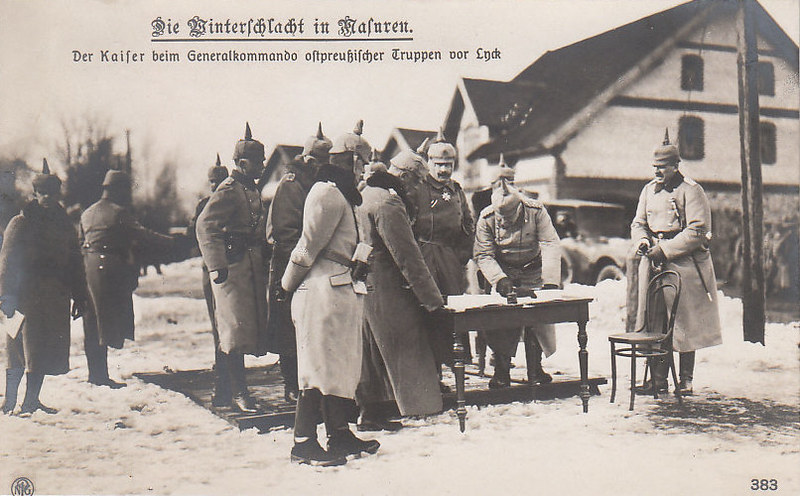
Kaiser Wilhelm II, Hindenburg and Ludendorff during Winter Battle of the Masurian Lakes

Sievers' ordered Evgeny Radkevich's 3rd Siberian Army Corps to pull back to Lyck, where it would form a new defensive line with the XXVI Corps. Nikolai Epanchin's 3rd Army Corps, which had already lost most of its equipment, withdrew to Kovno and Olita, where they no longer became a factor in the battle. Pavel Bulgakov's 20th Army Corps now faced the German XXI Corps and XXXIX Reserve Corps on its northern flank. According to Buttar, "Whilst the German advance might have been aided by the snow trampled by the retreating Russians, it was only possible at all because of the food abandoned by the retreating 10th Army; the movements of German supply columns were as restricted by the weather as everyone else."

Heavy snow fell on 11 February as temperatures dropped to −15 °C (5 °F). On 12 February, Otto von Lauenstein's XXXIX Reserve Corps captured Eydtkuhnen and Wirballen. On 14 February, the German 10th Army's XXI Corps, under the command of Fritz von Below, cut the road connecting Augustowo to Sejny. Lyck was also captured by the Germans on 14 February. The Russian 26th, 20th, and 3rd Siberian Army Corps were now in danger of being encircled. On 15 February, the weather changed to rain, and a thaw, turning the roads into knee-deep mud.

On 16 February, the Germans reached Augustowo, and Georg von der Marwitz's XXXVIII Reserve Corps captured Suwałki. Eichhorn's 10th Army was now to the north of Augustowo, while Below's 8th Army was to the west. Karl Litzmann's XL Reserve Corps were ordered over the Augustów Canal on 17 February, the 3rd Siberian Army Corps abandoned their defensive positions, while Bulgakov's 20th Army Corps, isolated, attempted to retreat to the east.

=== Destruction of the 20th Army Corps ===
For the commander of the huge 20th Army Corps, which had five infantry divisions instead of two like other Russian corps, P. Bulgakov, there was only one way out - to break through from the "encirclement" to the east, towards Grodno.

At the forefront of the huge corps column stretching out from Suwalki was the 27th Infantry Division. It was she who began the battle at Macharce on February 16. The ram attack of 16 Russian battalions hit three battalions of the German 65th Brigade (97th Infantry Regiment) and two batteries of the 15th Field Artillery Regiment and a pioneer company that had taken up positions. In a stubborn battle, the German batteries fired all the shells, the Russian infantry advanced their machine guns and fired at the covering soldiers.

Before the retreat to Frącki (no more than 250 men remained), the artillerymen managed to remove locks and sights from 8 guns and drown them in a swamp. Two machine guns were also lost. The commander of the 65th Brigade, Major General E. von Estorff, sent the remaining battalions of his brigade to Macharce. At the Gaienek Village, the Russian regiments, which continued to advance forward, dispersed one battalion and captured 2 more guns, but were stopped.

The approaching regiments of the 29th Infantry Division were thrown into the battle from the Russian side, and the regiments of the 59th Infantry Brigade from the German side. Since at that time the German 31st Division was successfully advancing through Sapotskin to Lipsk and Golynka, only the 42nd Division was supposed to hold the passage to Grodno. After suffering heavy losses, Estorff withdrew the remnants of the brigade.

It seemed that the breakthrough of Russian divisions on Grodno could no longer be stopped. But the German units showed a higher coherence of actions. Having learned about the battle from Macharce, the commander of the XXXIX Reserve Corps Otto von Lauenstein, without hesitation, sent the 78th Reserve Division there, which managed to approach the Frącki. The stubborn battle continued until the morning of February 17, when units of the 2nd Infantry Division made their way to Studzianki from the south and finally closed the encirclement around the Russian 27th, 28th, 29th, 53rd and parts of the 56th Infantry Divisions.

At the same time, the German 9th Landwehr Brigade broke into Augustow, capturing 5,000 prisoners, 12 guns and 2 machine guns and a banner. Macharce was also repulsed, all the lost guns and machine guns were returned, and the prisoners taken by the Russians were released. The banner of the 138th Infantry Regiment buried in the snow was also found. In just two days, the Germans lost 11 officers and 381 soldiers killed at Macharce, 15 officers and 665 soldiers wounded, and two officers and 1,020 soldiers missing.

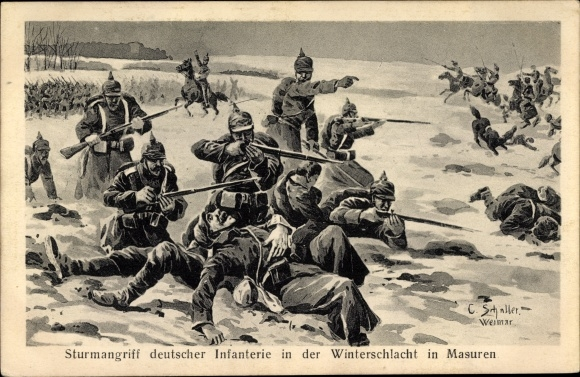
German soldiers at Winter Battle in Masuria against Russian cavalry

The Supreme Commander of All German Forces in the East considered the task of the operation solved. On February 18, the Germans who surrounded the 20th Army Corps began to eliminate it, the defense of the outer front of the encirclement was assigned to the R. Kosh group, reinforced by the Königsberg Landwehr, the 1st Cavalry Division and the 5th Guards Brigade. K. Litzman's group and the 4th Cavalry Division were transferred to the 10th Army to develop the offensive against the Bobr River and assist in the encirclement of Osowiec. The capture of the fortresses of the Narew line (Osowiec, Łomża, Różan) was entrusted to the 8th Army.

Part of the Russian troops south of Augustow managed to avoid encirclement. The Siberian Riflemen withdrew across the Bobr River and destroyed the bridges, stopping the pursuit in this way. The 64th and 84th Infantry Divisions of the 26th Army Corps retreated “due to a telegram sent by the mentally ill Chief of Staff, General Budberg, that the troops should retreat to Osowiec” (from the testimony of Infantry General Aleksandr Gerngross).

At Augustow, the corps suffered heavy losses, artillery parks, carts, divisional infirmaries, two light and mortar batteries were abandoned, but the infantry broke out of the already closing ring. This was also the merit of the fighters of the 20th Army Corps, who chained three German divisions to themselves on the way to Grodno. For the group of General Bulgakov, the path to salvation was closed, and the retreating neighbouring corps were never sent by Thadeus von Sivers on a counteroffensive to break through the ring from the outside.

The German 31st Infantry Division occupied Lipsk on February 18, and Bartniki on February 19 with minimal losses (2 killed, 6 wounded, while 13 Russian officers and 1,285 soldiers were taken prisoner). On this day, the 80th Reserve and 4th Cavalry Divisions started a battle on the Bobr River, closing at Kolnica with the 75th, 76th and 78th Reserve Divisions advancing from the north through Lipsk.

On February 20, the German divisions continued to compress the encirclement. On the night of February 21, Bulgakov decided on a new breakthrough attempt, taking advantage of a snowstorm. The Russian columns stormed the hastily prepared German positions near Lipina and Wołkusze. At the beginning of the battle, the commander of the German 65th Infantry Brigade, Major General E. von Estorff, fell, then the commander of the 31st Field Artillery Regiment, Lieutenant Colonel R. Kollmann, died. The commander of the 131st Infantry Regiment, Colonel K. Fisher, was seriously wounded.

In a fierce battle, German batteries almost point-blank shot at waves of attackers. All Russian attacks were repulsed, after the capture of Kurianka by the 76th Reserve Division, the Russian group was divided into several pockets of resistance, 5,600 men, led by a general, surrendered. During February 22, the encircled units of the 27th, 28th, 29th and 53rd Infantry Divisions, the headquarters and administration of the 20th Army Corps laid down their arms. The corps' losses reached 34,000, which actually meant a complete rout, but in heavy fighting the German troops suffered relatively heavy losses of 5,600. The desperate resistance of the surrounded soldiers saved the 10th army from complete defeat, thanks to which it later went on the offensive.

== Casualties and losses ==
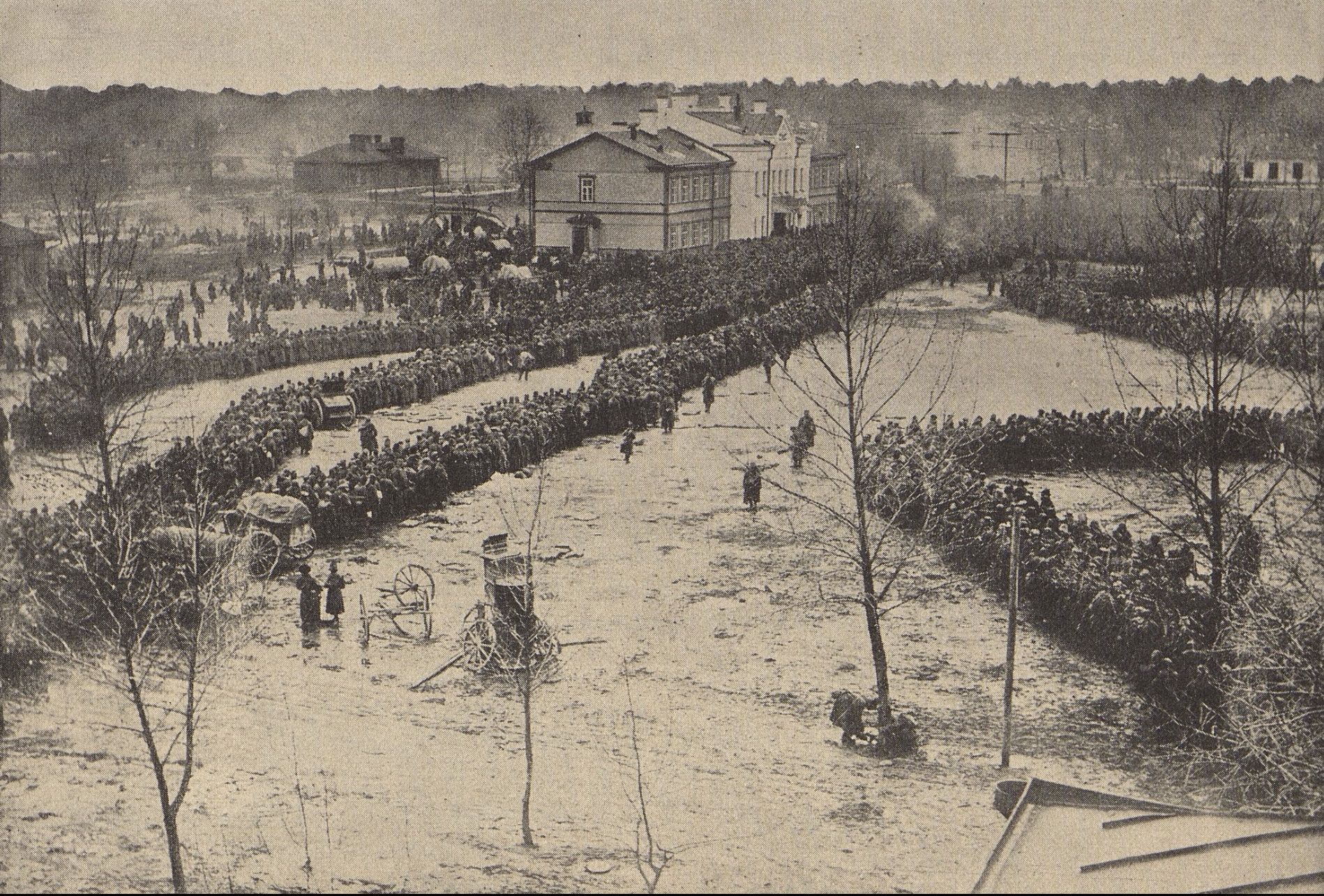
Bread distribution to 15,000 Russian captives in Augustów

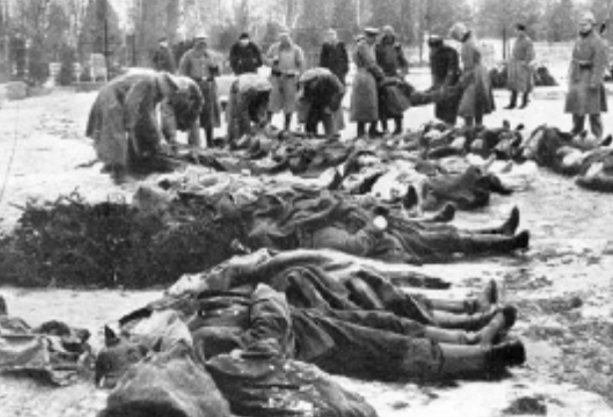
The burial of German soldiers who died in the winter of 1915 in East Prussia

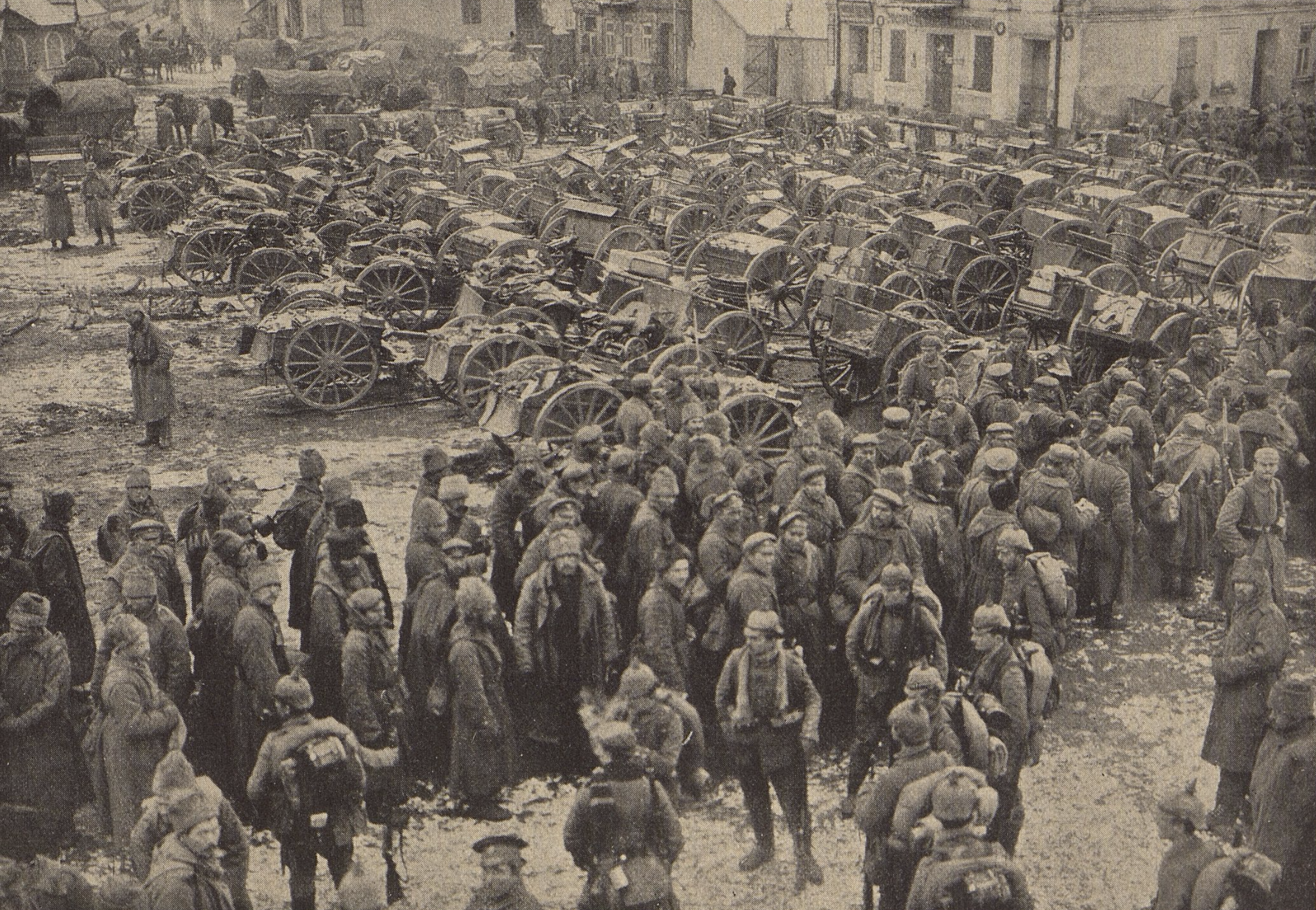
Russian captives in front of a park of captured guns and machine guns in Sejny

The "Winter Battle in Masuria" ended with the expulsion of the Russian troops of the 10th Army from the borders of East Prussia, inflicting heavy losses on them and capturing parts of four infantry divisions. The German side notes the planned development of the operation, which was not disturbed by the actions of the Russian command. The main task was solved by the Germans.

The encirclement of the Russian 10th Army in its entirety could hardly have taken place. The German armies in East Prussia did not have the strength for this. More active actions on the Russian side could prevent the 20th Army Corps from dying, and turn the tide of battles. However, it was in this operation on the Russian side that the command, both at the level of the front and the army, and at the level of the corps, showed the worst qualities - lack of confidence in victory, contradictions and errors in assessing the situation, and stiffness in the initiative. These flaws cost the Russian soldiers dearly.

Although there was no radical turning point in the war as a result of the operation, with such a task not set, the German troops managed to defend East Prussia, completely liberate it from Russian troops and minimize, as it turned out later, the possibility of a new invasion of Germany. Russian troops captured 40 officers and 1,666 soldiers, captured 15 machine guns and 6 guns.

The damage of the Russian troops was disproportionately greater. If on the German side, from the commanding staff one general (brigade commander), one lieutenant colonel (regiment commander) died and a colonel (regiment commander) was wounded, then in the Russian 10th Army one general (brigade commander) and 7 colonel commanders of regiments were killed, 12 generals and 11 colonels were captured (from the corps commander to the regimental commanders), one regiment commander was wounded.

According to Sergey Nelipovich's research, Russian troops lost 133,000 including 85,000 prisoners. He also points out that the German print media overestimated the number of prisoners by 100,000.

The losses of German troops are estimated at 20,000 to 31,000.

== Outcome ==
The Second Battle of the Masurian Lakes gave the Germans a toehold in Russia. The Russians blocked further advances. In the following weeks, the Germans drove the Russians out of their remaining small enclaves in East Prussia.

According to Buttar, "For Hindenburg and Ludendorff, the Second Battle of the Masurian Lakes – known in Germany as the Winter Battle of Masuria – was undoubtedly a victory, but it fell short of what had been intended. Much of Sievers' 10th Army escaped the German attempts to create an encirclement to rival Tannenberg, albeit with substantial losses."

Yuri Danilov, the Russian quartermaster general, stated, "This offensive by the German 8th and 10th Armies in February 1915 was definitely a great success for our enemies. Our 10th Army was forced to withdraw from the territory of East Prussia, this time permanently. Once more, we suffered very severe losses of men and military material, in addition to which we suffered a substantial blow to our prestige in East Prussia for the third time. Our plan to secure this province in order to anchor our right flank and to advance on the lower Vistula was rendered impossible by the German tactical victory."

== See also ==
- First Battle of the Masurian Lakes
- Battle of Łomża
- First Battle of Przasnysz

== Sources ==
- Benninghof, Mike, Ph.D., Winter's Battle: An Infantry Attacks Campaign Study, Irondale, Alabama: Avalanche Press, 2023.
- Oleynikov, Alexei (2016). Россия-щит Антанты [Russia-Shield of Entente]. Foreword by Nikolai Starikov. St.Petersburg: Piter. ISBN 978-5-496-01795-4.
- Miltatuli, Pyotr (2017). Россия в эпоху царствование Николая II [Russia in the reign of Nicholas II] (in Russian). Vol. 2. Moscow: Русский издательский центр имени святого Василия Великого. ISBN 978-5-42490057-7. OCLC 1038064891.
- Tucker, Spencer C. The Great War: 1914–18 (1998)
- Nelipovich, Sergei (2022). Istoricheskie_issledovaniya_(seriya_mejizdat)/%CD%E5%EB%E8%EF%EE%E2%E8%F7%20%D1.%C3._%20%D0%F3%F1%F1%EA%E8%E9%20%F4%F0%EE%ED%F2%20%EF%E5%F0%E2%EE%E9%20%EC%E8%F0%EE%E2%EE%E9%20%E2%EE%E9%ED%FB.%20%CF%EE%F2%E5%F0%E8%20%F1%F2%EE%F0%EE%ED.%201915.(2022).pdf Русский фронт 1915: Потери сторон [The Russian Front 1915: Losses of the sides] (PDF) (in Russian). Квадрига. ISBN 978-5-91791-447-3.
- Oleynikov, Alexei (2023). Германский натиск на Восток 1915 [The German push to the East 1915] (in Russian). Veče. ISBN 978-5-4484-4327-5.
- Borisyuk, Andrey (2024). Забытая война. Россия в 1914-1918 [The forgotten war. Russia in 1914-1918] (in Russian). Moscow: Вече. ISBN 978-5-4484-5078-5.
- The Second Battle of the Masurian Lakes, 1915
