= Latynnyky =

Ethnically Ukrainian Roman Catholics in the Second Polish Republic

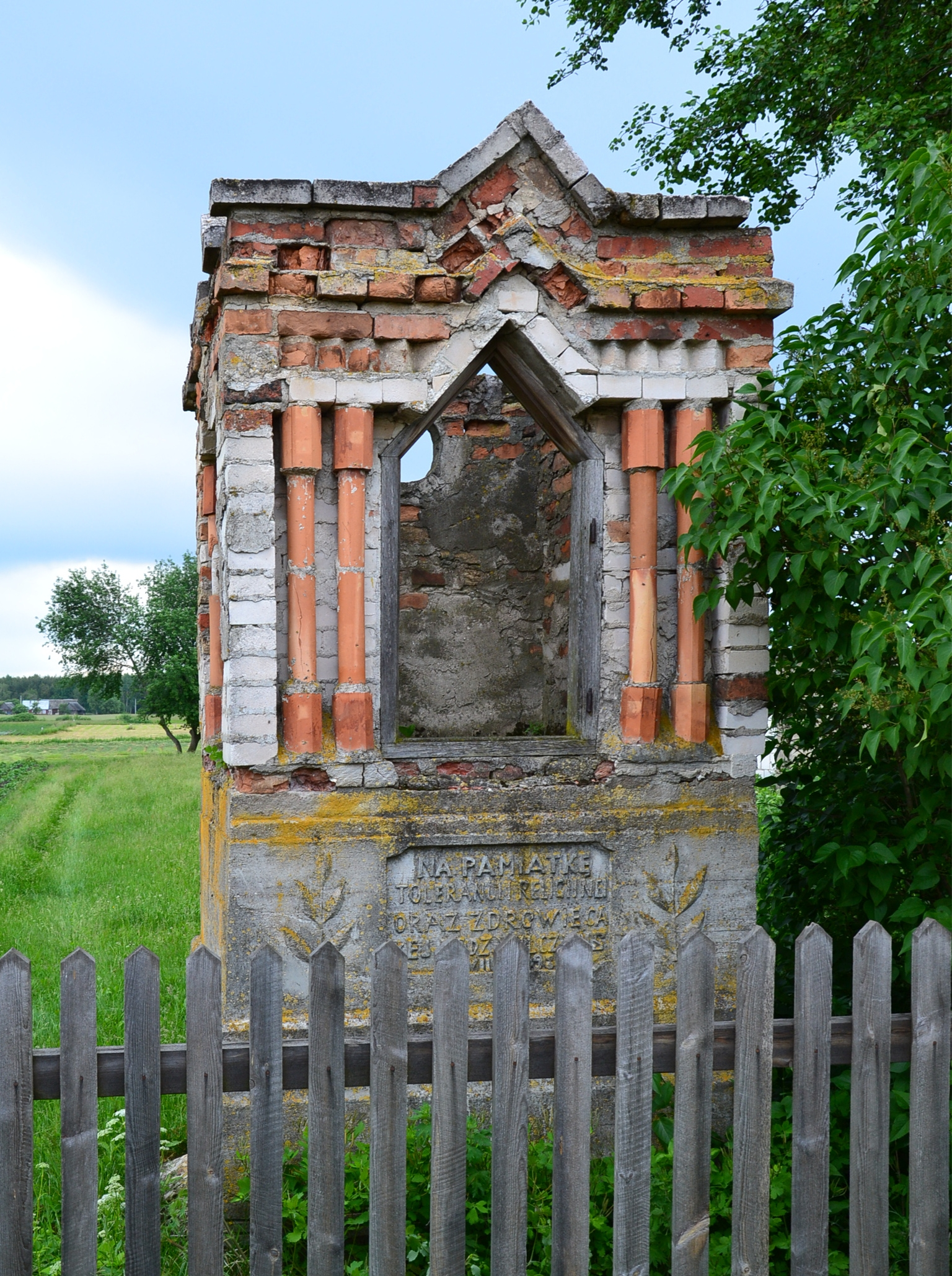
A former Latynnyk wayside shrine in Stare Leśne Bohatery

Latynnyky (Ukrainian: латинники; Polish: łacinnicy) (Note: Also referred to as kalakuty (Ukrainian: калакути).) was a term used by the Ukrainian population of Western Ukraine to refer to culturally-Ukrainian Roman Catholics during the Second Polish Republic.

== History ==
The phenomenon of Latynnyky emerged in the late 19th century, both in the Austro-Hungarian Kingdom of Galicia and Lodomeria and in Ukrainian areas of the Russian Empire. In Galicia and Lodomeria, Latynnyky emerged both among ethnic Ukrainians who had converted to the Latin Church and Polish people who had been assimilated into Ukrainian culture but retained their religion.

In the Russian Empire, conversely, the growth of Latynnyky was a form of resistance to Russian efforts to spread Eastern Orthodoxy to members of the Ukrainian Greek Catholic Church in Chełm Land and Podlachia. Another wave of Catholicisation occurred in 1905, following a loosening of religious restrictions by the Russian government. Furthermore, in both Austria-Hungary and Russia, religious conversion to Catholicism was regarded by the local population as a requirement for marriages between Poles and Ukrainians.

With the establishment of the Second Polish Republic following World War I, Latynnyky found themselves in Polish territory. At this time, according to Ukrainian nationalist historian Volodymyr Kubijovyč, Latynnyky had a weak national identity, and many later associated themselves with Poland, rather than Ukraine.

After the Polish–Soviet border agreement of August 1945 formally annexed western Ukraine into the Soviet Union, most Latynnyky remained in the Ukrainian Soviet Socialist Republic and were fully assimilated into Ukrainian society. Others emigrated further westwards into Poland.

== Demographics ==
The population of Latynnyky was placed at several numbers in a wide range depending on the demographer. Between 1869 and 1870, Ukrainian ethnographer Pavlo Chubynskyi recorded 32,041 Roman Catholics who natively spoke the Ukrainian language in the Lublin and Siedlce Governorates of Congress Poland. The Russian Empire census in 1897 reported a number of 1,490,546 Roman Catholics who stated their native language as "Russian" (including Ukrainian, Belarusian, and Russian).

After World War I, the 1921 Polish census recorded 16,239 ethnically-Ukrainian Roman Catholics. According to Kubijovyč, however, this was a vast undershoot of the real population, which he claimed numbered at 360,000 between Podlachia, Chełm Land, and Lublin Voivodeship. The General Government, Nazi Germany's occupational government over Poland, estimated that between 188,000 and 200,000 Latynnyky lived under their rule. The Encyclopedia of Ukraine estimated a number of 700,000 in 1939, with 515,000 in Galicia and the remainder in Volhynia and Podolia.
