= Safiyova =

Safiyova Сафіёва (Belarusian)
- Village
- Location within Belarus
- Coordinates: 53°42′24″N 23°36′9″E
- Country: Belarus
- Region: Grodno Region
- District: Grodno District
- Area code: +375-152

Safiyova (Belarusian: Сафіёва, romanized: Safijova; Russian: Софиёво; Polish: Zofiowo) is a village in Grodno District, Grodno Region, Belarus. It is located close to the Belarus–Poland border. It is a part of Padlabyennye rural council (selsoviet). In 1999, it had a population of 45 and in 2010 the number decreased to 9. Lipszczany is a village located in the Polish side of the border. There is a plan to open a border crossing between Belarus and Poland next to the village.
