= Pavel Bulgakov =

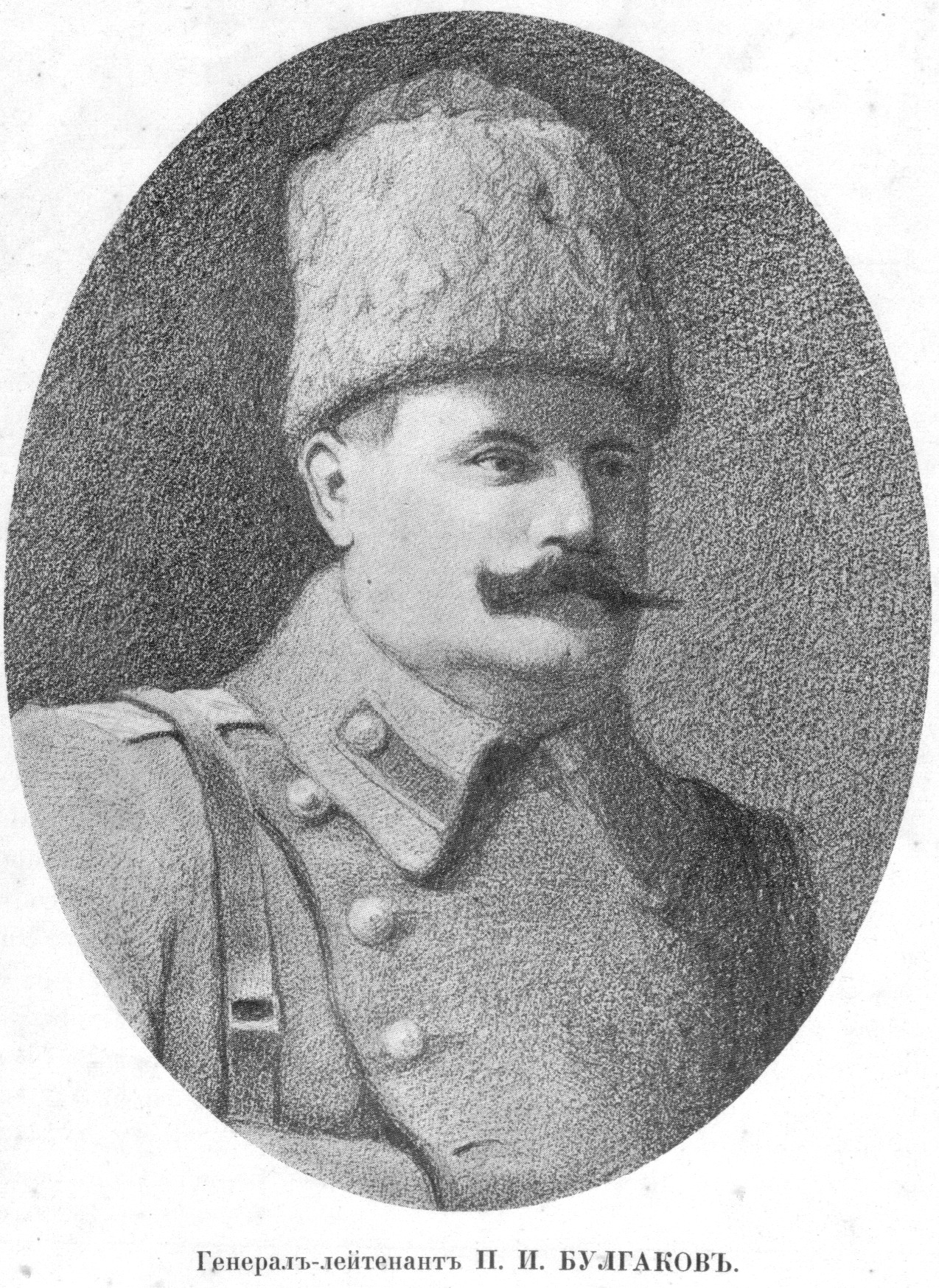
- Born: 3 August 1856
- Died: 1940 (aged 83–84) Moldovan SSR, USSR
- Allegiance: Russian Empire
- Branch: Imperial Russian Army
- Rank: General of the Artillery
- Commands: 25th Infantry Division; 20th Army Corps
- Conflicts: Russo-Turkish War; World War I; Russian invasion of East Prussia; Second Battle of the Masurian Lakes

Pavel Illyich Bulgakov (3 August 1856 – 1940) was an Imperial Russian division and corps commander. He fought in the war against the Ottoman Empire. He took part in the Russian invasion of East Prussia, a part of the German Empire. On 18 February 1915, his forces were surrounded the German Tenth Army in the Augustow Forest. On 21 February 1915 he and surviving men surrendered. This provided time for the rest of the Russian Tenth Army to form a new defensive position. Bulgakov was taken prisoner by the Germans and remained in captivity until after the Treaty of Brest-Litovsk. On 3 August 1918 he was released. He traveled by train to Mtsensk in Oryol Oblast, where he was hospitalized after arriving on 8 August 1918. On 6 September 1918 he went to Bălți, Bessarabia (now in Moldova, then controlled by Romania). He remained there for the duration of the Russian Civil War and after the Bolshevik victory. He died shortly after Bessarabia was annexed by the Soviet Union, in detention.

== Awards ==
- Order of Saint Stanislaus (House of Romanov), 3rd class, 1879
- Order of Saint Vladimir, 3rd class, 1898
- Order of Saint Stanislaus (House of Romanov), 1st class, 1905
- Order of Saint Anna, 1st class, 1910
- Order of Saint George, 4th degree (13 January 1915)
- Order of the White Eagle (Russian Empire) (26 February 1915)

Preceded by	Commander of the 25th Infantry Division; 1911–1914	Succeeded by
Preceded by Vladimir Vasilyevich Smirnov	Commander of the 20th Army Corps; December 1914 – February 1915	Succeeded by Alexander Iosafovich Ievreinov

== Sources ==
- Залесский К. А. Кто был кто в Первой мировой войне. М., 2003.
- Гущин Ф. А., Жебровский С. С. Пленные генералы Российской императорской армии 1914–1917. Русский путь. 2010.
- Волков С. В. Офицеры российской гвардии. М. 2002
- "Pavel Bulgakov" (in Russian). «Russian army in a Great war» project.
