= 30th Siberian Rifle Regiment =

Siberian 30th Rifle Regiment
- Сибирский 30-й стрелковый полк
- Active: October 30, 1899 – 1918
- Country: Russian Empire
- Allegiance: Imperial Russian Army
- Branch: Army
- Garrison/HQ: Krasnoyarsk
- Engagements: Second Battle of the Masurian Lakes; World War I

The 30th Siberian Rifle Regiment is an infantry military unit of the Imperial Russian Army.

== History ==
Formed in 1899, the regiment was stationed in Krasnoyarsk. On the start of the First World War, the regiment's authorized organization consisted of four battalions, each with four companies, as well as a rear (support) company. A wartime infantry company comprised approximately 240 soldiers and 4–5 officers. At the regimental level, there were also a machine-gun detachment (8 machine guns), a signals detachment (including 14 mounted messengers and 21 telephone operators), and a reconnaissance detachment (64 scouts, including four cyclists). In total, the regiment numbered approximately 4,000 soldiers.

== Regimental commanders ==
- 7 April 1908 – 1 April 1915 — Mikhail Vikentyevich Izhitsky
- 16 July 1915 – 8 July 1917 — Alexander Nikolayevich Izyumov
