= Lipsk =

Town in Podlaskie Voivodeship, Poland

Lipsk Lipsk nad Biebrzą
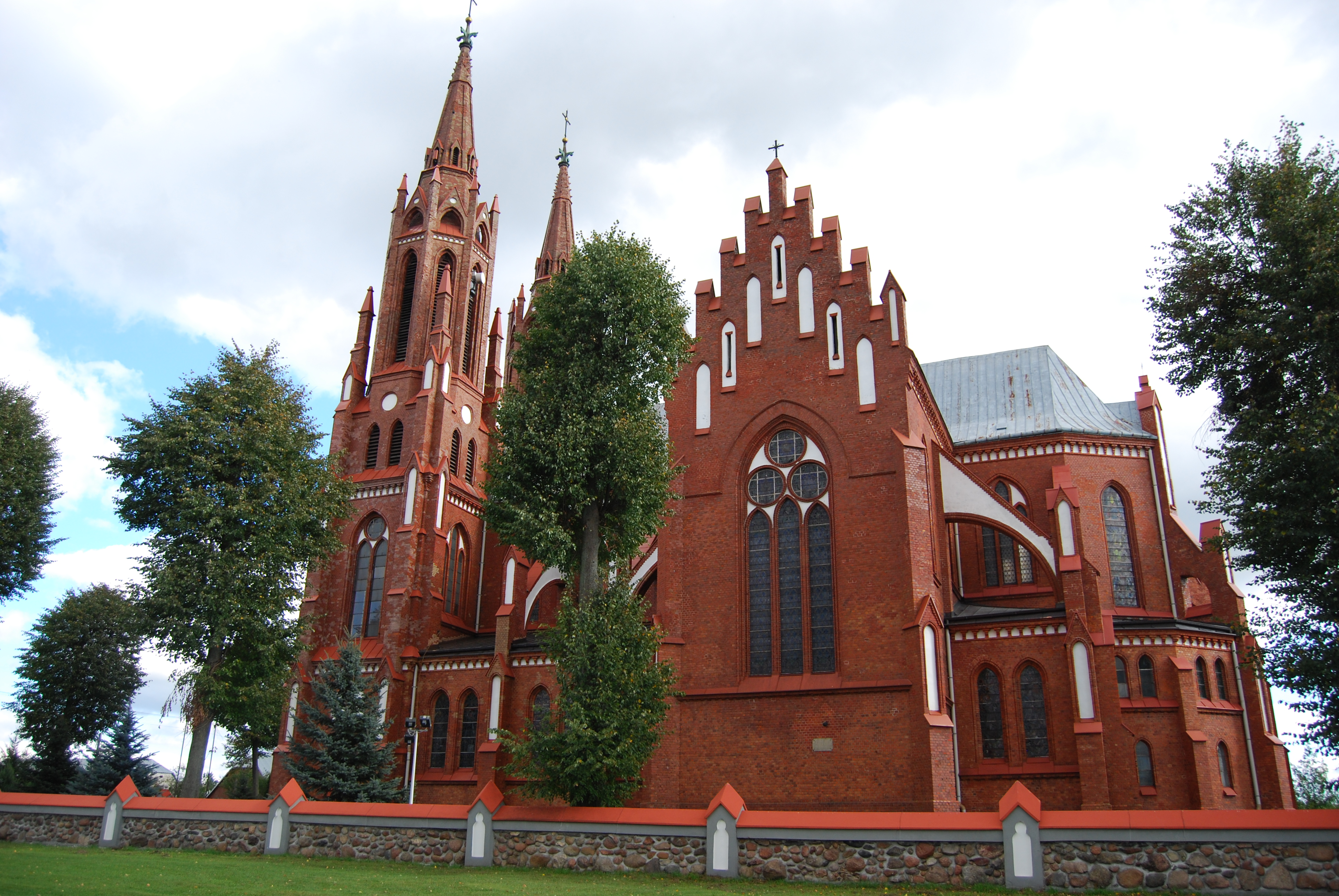
- Church of Our Lady of the Angels

- Coat of arms

- Location within Poland
- Coordinates: 53°44′N 23°24′E
- Country: Poland
- Voivodeship: Podlaskie
- County: Augustów
- Gmina: Lipsk
- Town rights: 1580

Government
  - Mayor: Lech Łępicki

Area
  - Total: 4.97 km^{2} (1.92 sq mi)

Population (2019-06-30)
  - Total: 2,326
  - Density: 468/km^{2} (1,210/sq mi)
- Time zone: UTC+1 (CET)
  - Summer (DST): UTC+2 (CEST)
- Postal code: 16-315
- Area code: +48 87
- Vehicle registration: BAU
- Website: http://www.lipsk.pl

Lipsk [lʲipsk] (also Lipsk nad Biebrzą) is a town in Augustów County, Podlaskie Voivodeship, in north-eastern Poland, with 2,520 inhabitants (2004).

== History ==
Lipsk was granted town rights in 1580 by King Stephen Báthory by virtue of a privilege issued in nearby Grodno. It was a royal town until the Third Partition of Poland when it was annexed by Prussia. In 1807 it was regained by Poles as part of the short-lived Duchy of Warsaw. In 1815 it became part of Congress Poland, later on forcibly integrated with Imperial Russia. As part of anti-Polish repressions after the January Uprising, Lipsk was deprived of town rights by the Russian administration in 1869. Under Russian rule, it was known as Лейпциг на Бебже. It was part of Poland again, after the country again regained independence in 1918. According to the 1921 census, the population was 98.4% Polish and 1.6% Jewish.

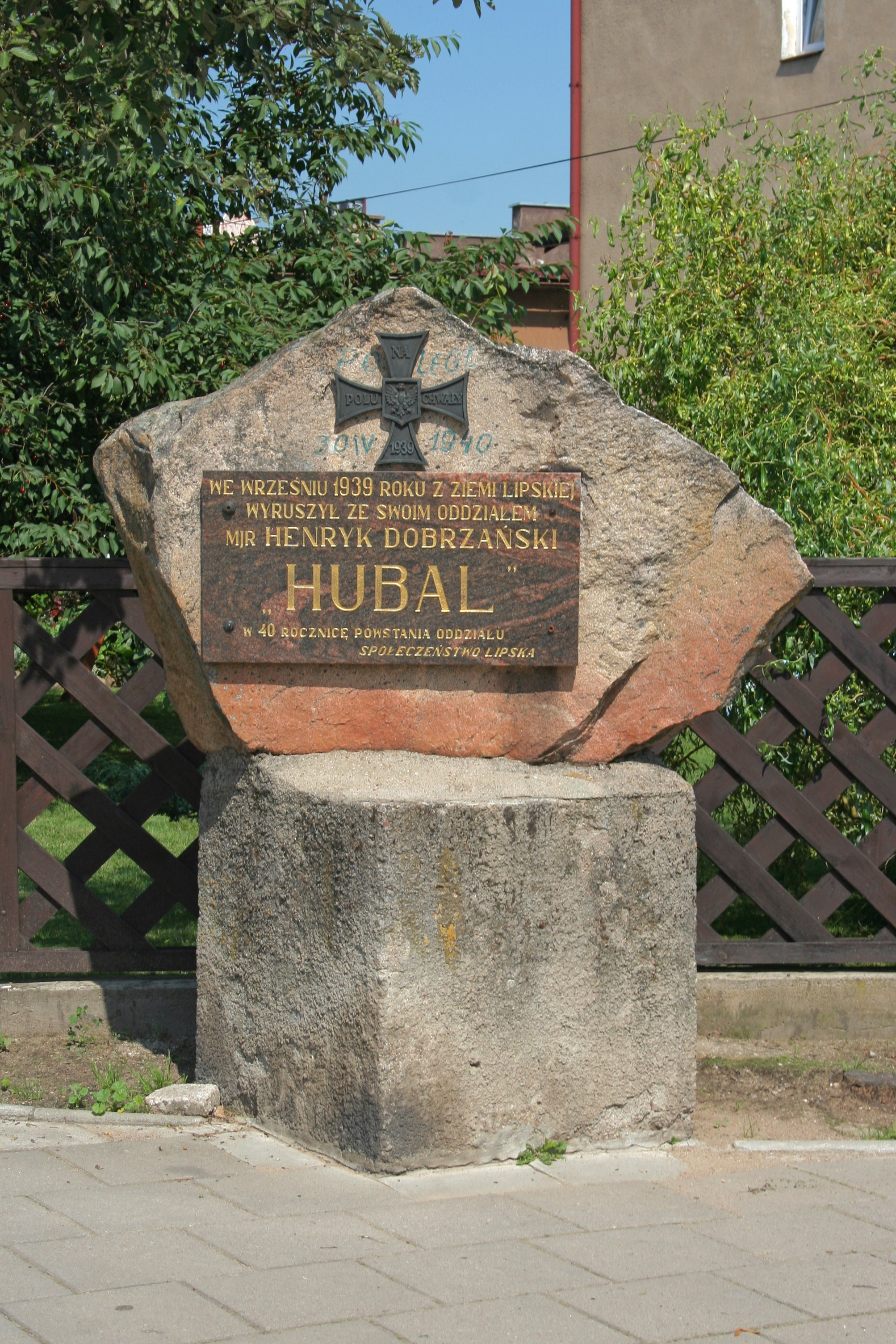
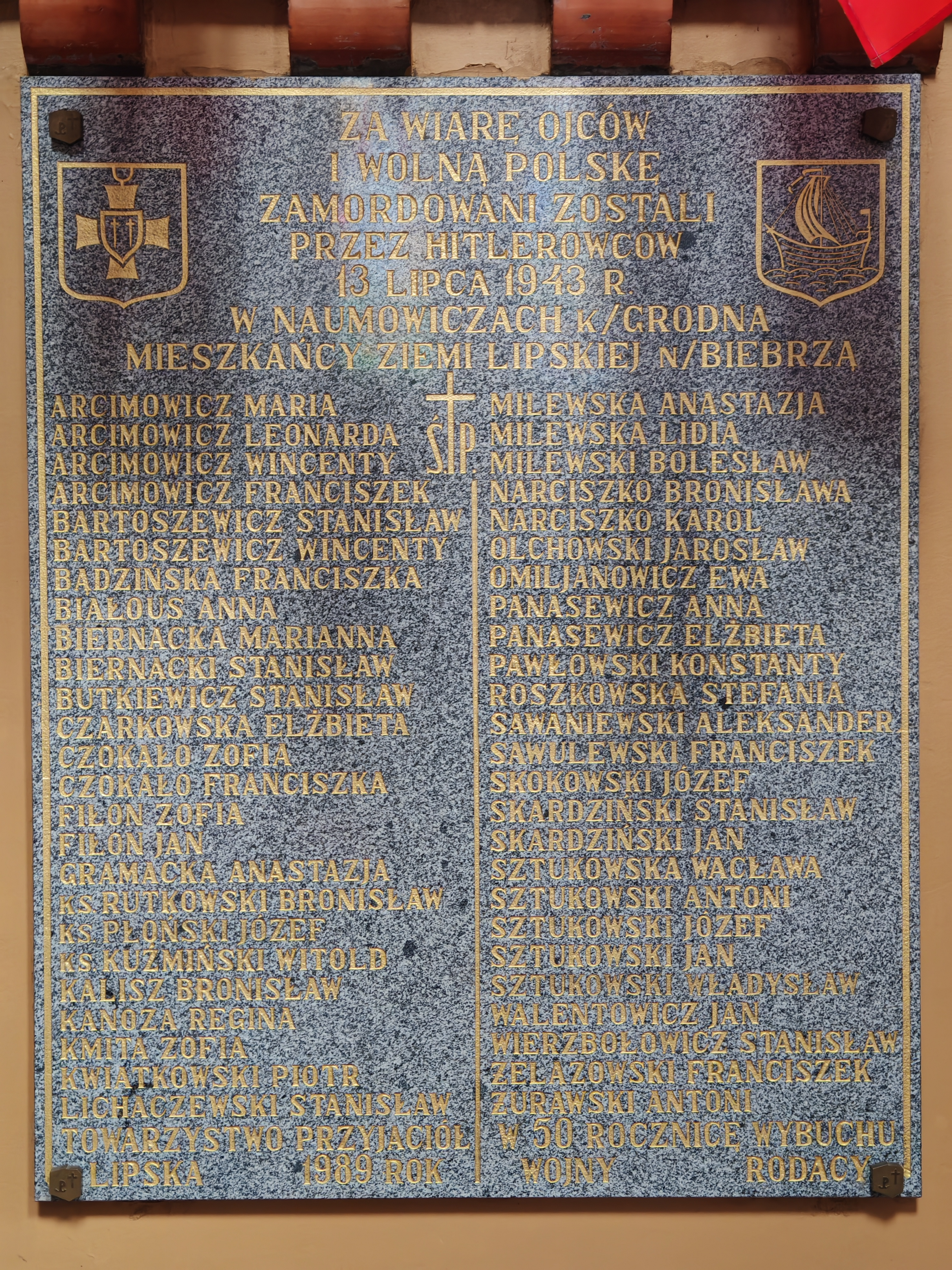
Memorials to Major Henryk Dobrzański and victims of the German-perpetrated massacre of 1943

During World War II it was occupied by the Soviet Union from September 1939 to June 1941. Several Polish families were deported deep into the USSR. From June 1941 to July 1944 it was occupied by Nazi Germany. In 1941, the Germans deported 99 local Jews to the ghettos in Augustów and Grodno, from where they were later transported to the Treblinka extermination camp. On July 13, 1943, the Germans murdered 50 Poles from Lipsk in nearby Naumowicze. Among those killed was Marianna Biernacka, one of the 108 Martyrs of World War II. Polish partisans of the Home Army launched an attack on a German gendarmerie post in Lipsk on 3 November 1943. In July 1944, Lipsk was captured by the Red Army, and murders and robberies followed, as well as the fight against the Polish Home Army resistance movement.

Lipsk was restored to Poland, although with a Soviet-installed communist regime, which stayed in power until the Fall of Communism in the 1980s. The Polish anti-communist resistance was active in Lipsk, and in 1945 it raided a local communist police station.

Lipsk regained its municipal rights in 1983.
