= Nowy Rogożyn =

- Village
- Location within Poland
- Coordinates: 53°43′N 23°27′E
- Country: Poland
- Voivodeship: Podlaskie
- County: Augustów
- Gmina: Lipsk

Nowy Rogożyn [ˈnɔvɨ rɔˈɡɔʐɨn] is a village in the administrative district of Gmina Lipsk, within Augustów County, Podlaskie Voivodeship, in north-eastern Poland, close to the border with Belarus.
