= Żabickie =

- Village
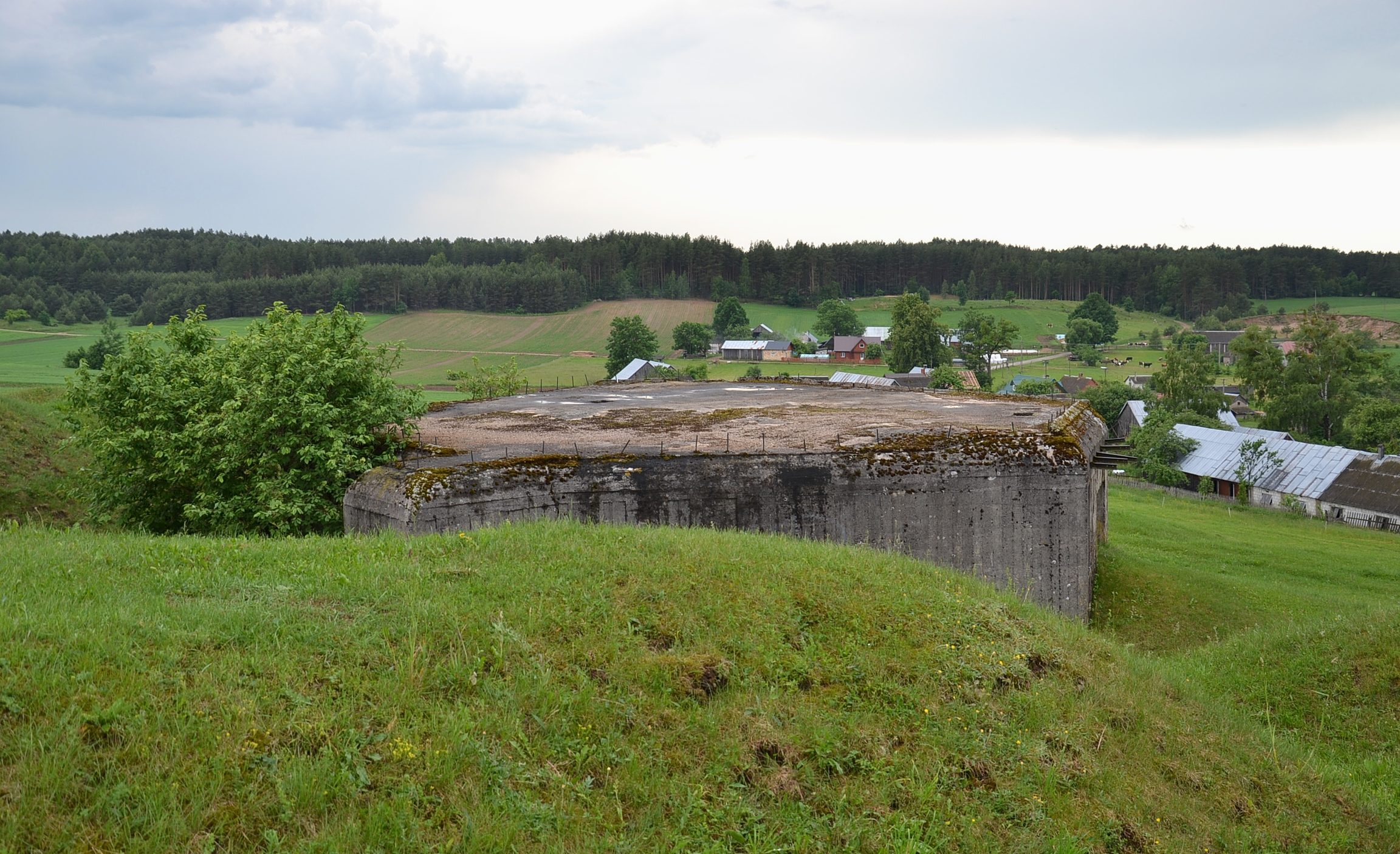
- Ruins of the Molotov Line in the village vicinity

- Location within Poland
- Coordinates: 53°48′N 23°28′E
- Country: Poland
- Voivodeship: Podlaskie
- County: Augustów
- Gmina: Lipsk

Żabickie [ʐaˈbit͡skʲɛ] is a village in the administrative district of Gmina Lipsk, within Augustów County, Podlaskie Voivodeship, in northeastern Poland, close to the border with Belarus.
