= Lipsk Murowany =

- Settlement
- Location within Poland
- Coordinates: 53°44′37″N 23°31′51″E
- Country: Poland
- Voivodeship: Podlaskie
- County: Augustów
- Gmina: Lipsk

Lipsk Murowany [ˈlipsk murɔˈvanɨ] is a settlement in the administrative district of Gmina Lipsk, within Augustów County, Podlaskie Voivodeship, in north-eastern Poland, close to the border with Belarus.
