= Krasne, Augustów County =

Krasne
- Village
- Location within Poland
- Coordinates: 53°46′N 23°21′E
- Country: Poland
- Voivodeship: Podlaskie
- County: Augustów
- Gmina: Lipsk
- Postal code: 16-315
- Vehicle registration: BAU

Krasne [ˈkrasnɛ] is a village in the administrative district of Gmina Lipsk, within Augustów County, Podlaskie Voivodeship, in north-eastern Poland, close to the border with Belarus.

Four Polish citizens were murdered by Nazi Germany in the village during World War II.
