= Gmina Lipsk =

Gmina Lipsk Lipsk Commune
- Gmina
- Coat of arms

- Gmina Lipsk within the Augustów County
- Coordinates (Lipsk): 53°44′N 23°24′E
- Country: Poland
- Voivodeship: Podlaskie
- County: Augustów
- Seat: Lipsk

Area
  - Total: 184.42 km^{2} (71.20 sq mi)

Population (2019-06-30)
  - Total: 5,129
  - Density: 27.81/km^{2} (72.03/sq mi)
  - Urban: 2,326
  - Rural: 2,803
- Website: http://www.lipsk.pl

Gmina Lipsk is an urban-rural gmina (administrative district) in Augustów County, Podlaskie Voivodeship, in north-eastern Poland, on the border with Belarus. Its seat is the town of Lipsk, which lies approximately 32 kilometres (20 mi) south-east of Augustów and 71 km (44 mi) north of the regional capital Białystok.

The gmina covers an area of 184.42 square kilometres (71.2 sq mi), and as of 2019 its total population is 5,129 (out of which the population of Lipsk amounts to 2,326 and the population of the rural part of the gmina is 2,803).

== Villages ==
Apart from the town of Lipsk, Gmina Lipsk contains the villages and settlements of Bartniki, Dolinczany, Dulkowszczyzna, Jaczniki, Jałowo, Jasionowo, Kolonie Lipsk, Kopczany, Krasne, Kurianka, Lichosielce, Lipsk Murowany, Lipszczany, Lubinowo, Nowe Leśne Bohatery, Nowy Lipsk, Nowy Rogożyn, Podwołkuszne, Rakowicze, Rogożynek, Rygałówka, Siółko, Skieblewo, Sołojewszczyzna, Stare Leśne Bohatery, Starożyńce, Stary Rogożyn, Wołkusz, Wyżarne and Żabickie.

== Neighbouring gminas ==
Gmina Lipsk is bordered by the gminas of Dąbrowa Białostocka, Nowy Dwór, Płaska and Sztabin. It also borders Belarus.
