= Navumavichy =

Village in Grodno Region, Belarus

Navumavichy Навумавічы (Belarusian)
- Village
- Location within Belarus
- Coordinates: 53°43′N 23°42′E
- Country: Belarus
- Region: Grodno Region
- District: Grodno District
- Population (2010): 266
- Time zone: UTC+3 (MSK)
- Area code: +375 152

Navumavichy (Belarusian: Навумавічы, romanized: Navumavičy; Russian: Наумовичи, romanized: Naumovichi; Polish: Naumowicze) is a village in Grodno District, Grodno Region, in western Belarus. It is part of Padlabyennye selsoviet. Navumavichy is located a few kilometers north of Grodno. It has 266 inhabitants.

== History ==
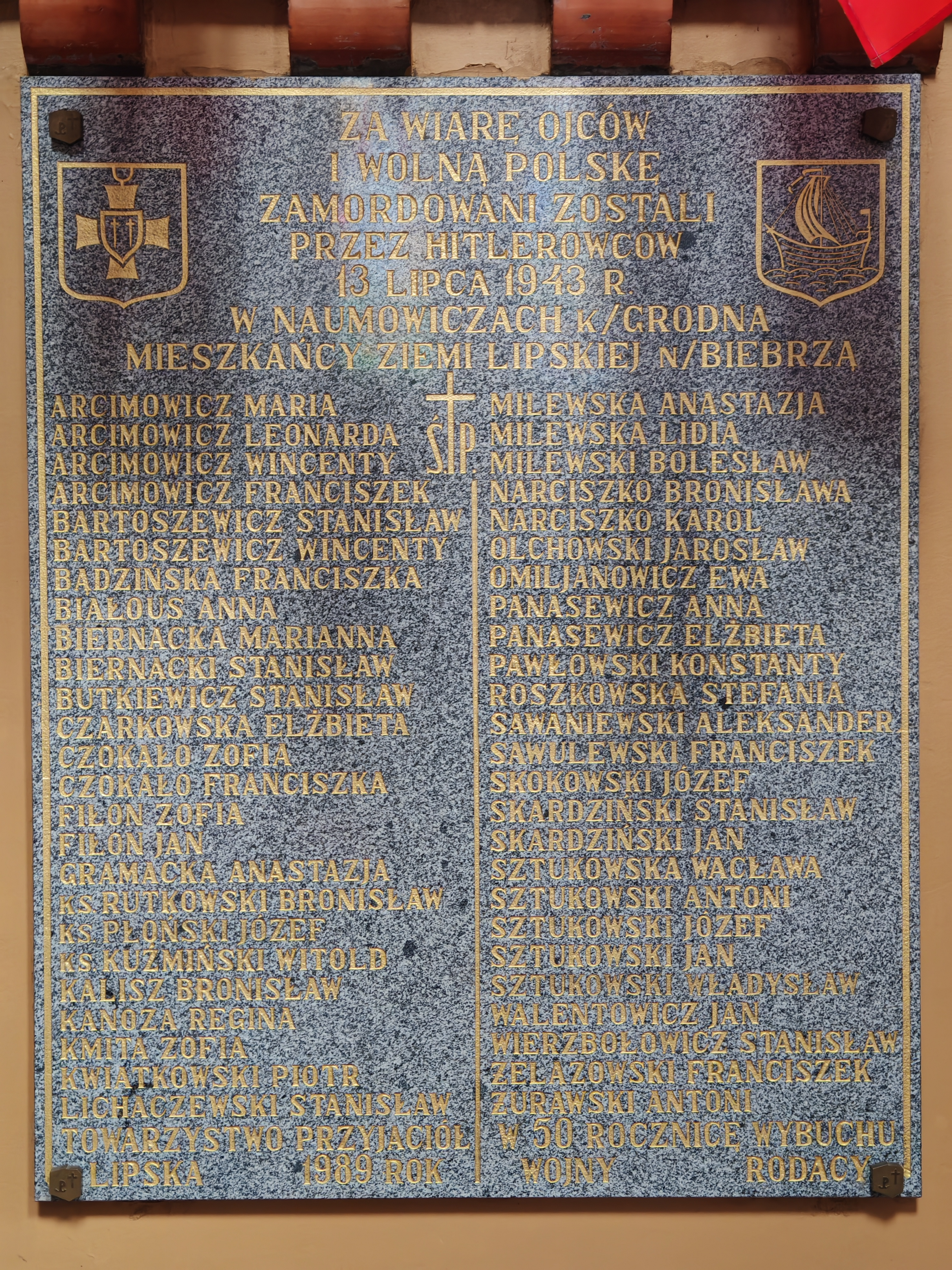
Plaque in Lipsk commemorating Poles from Lipsk massacred by German occupiers in Naumowicze in 1943

It was a royal village of the Polish–Lithuanian Commonwealth prior to the Partitions of Poland. It was again part of Poland in the interwar period, after the country regained independence in 1918. It was administratively part of the Białystok Voivodeship. According to the 1921 census, the population was 97% Polish and 1.6% Belarusian.

Following the joint German-Soviet invasion of Poland, which started World War II in September 1939, the village was first occupied by the Soviet Union until 1941, and then by Germany until 1944. Approximately 3,000 people including Jews were killed in this location by the German Nazis. On July 13, 1943, the Germans murdered 50 Poles from the nearby town Lipsk at the site. Among those killed was Marianna Biernacka, one of the 108 Blessed Polish Martyrs of World War II.

== Demographics ==
Historical population
Year	Pop.	±%
1866	267	—
1921	369	+38.2%
