= Podwołkuszne =

Village in Gmina Lipsk, Poland

- Village
- Location within Poland
- Coordinates: 53°48′06″N 23°29′23″E
- Country: Poland
- Voivodeship: Podlaskie
- County: Augustów
- Gmina: Lipsk

Podwołkuszne [pɔdvɔu̯ˈkuʂnɛ] is a village in the administrative district of Gmina Lipsk, within Augustów County, Podlaskie Voivodeship, in north-eastern Poland, close to the border with Belarus.
