= Nowy Lipsk =

- Village
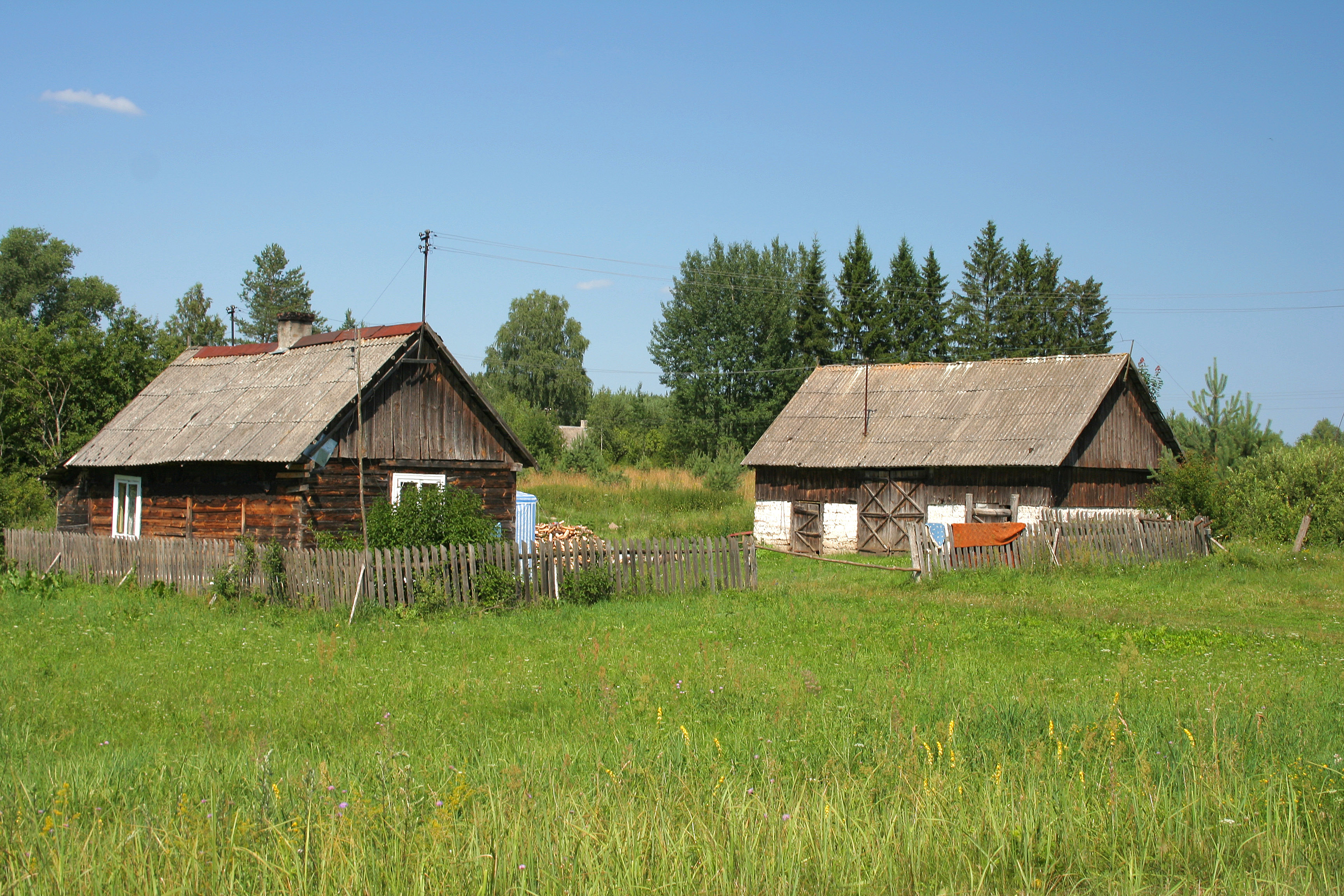

- Location within Poland
- Coordinates: 53°44′16″N 23°19′15″E
- Country: Poland
- Voivodeship: Podlaskie
- County: Augustów
- Gmina: Lipsk

Nowy Lipsk [ˈnɔvɨ ˈlipsk] is a village in the administrative district of Gmina Lipsk, within Augustów County, Podlaskie Voivodeship, in north-eastern Poland, close to the border with Belarus.
