= Jałowo, Augustów County =

Jałowo
- Village
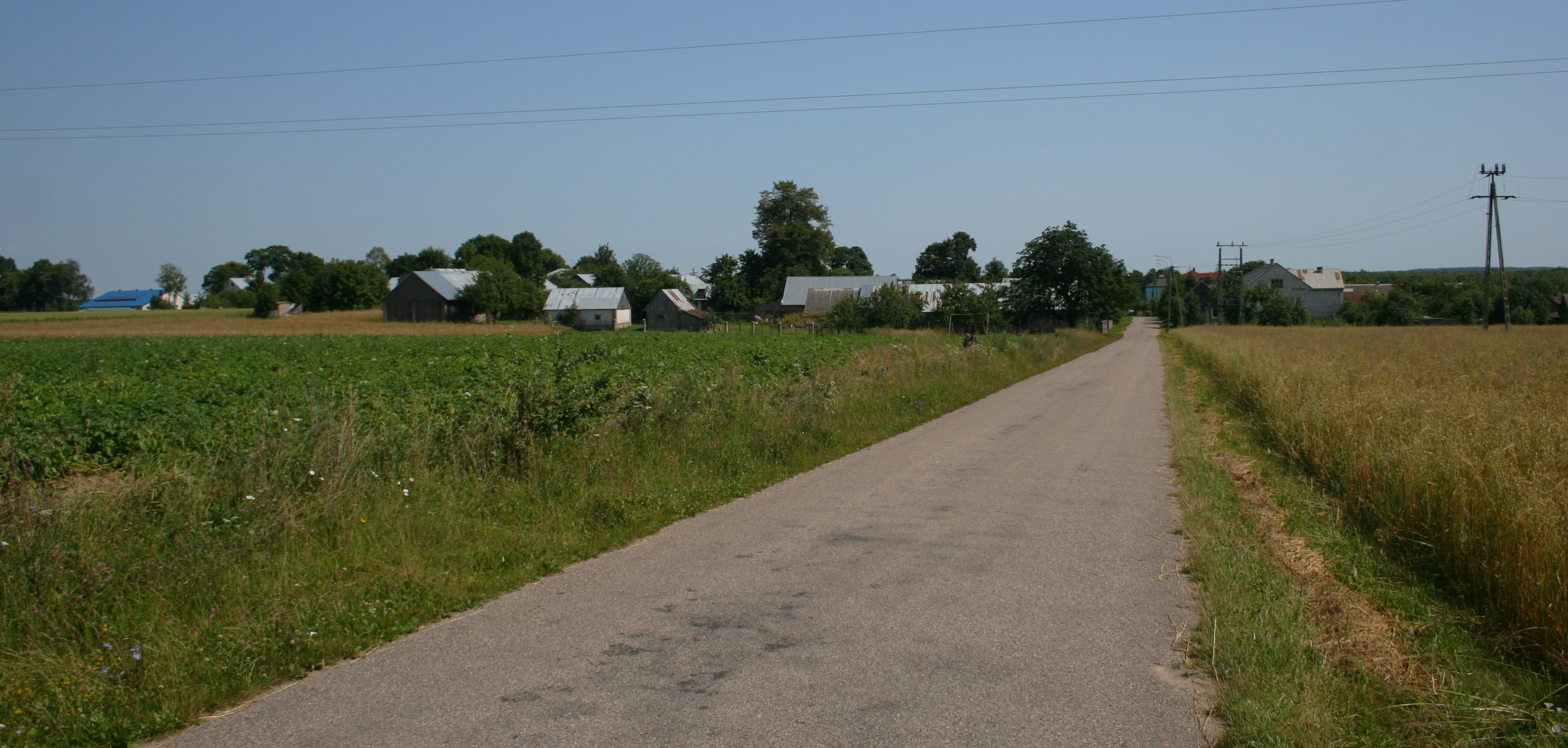

- Location within Poland
- Coordinates: 53°43′11″N 23°22′22″E
- Country: Poland
- Voivodeship: Podlaskie
- County: Augustów
- Gmina: Lipsk

Jałowo [jaˈwɔvɔ] is a village in the administrative district of Gmina Lipsk, within Augustów County, Podlaskie Voivodeship, in north-eastern Poland, close to the border with Belarus.
