= Molotov Line =

Soviet fortification system (1940–1941)

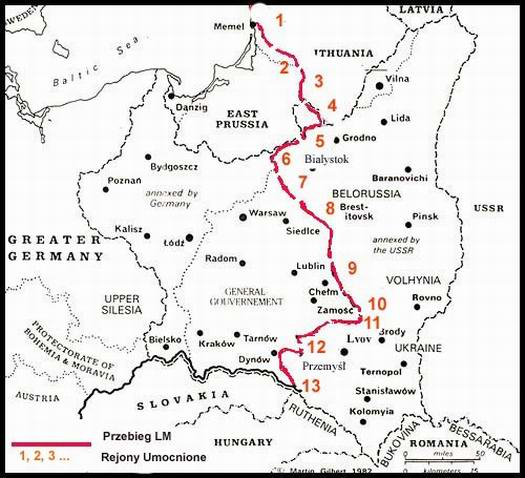
Molotov Line and its fortified districts, on a map showing the borders in the 1939–1941 period

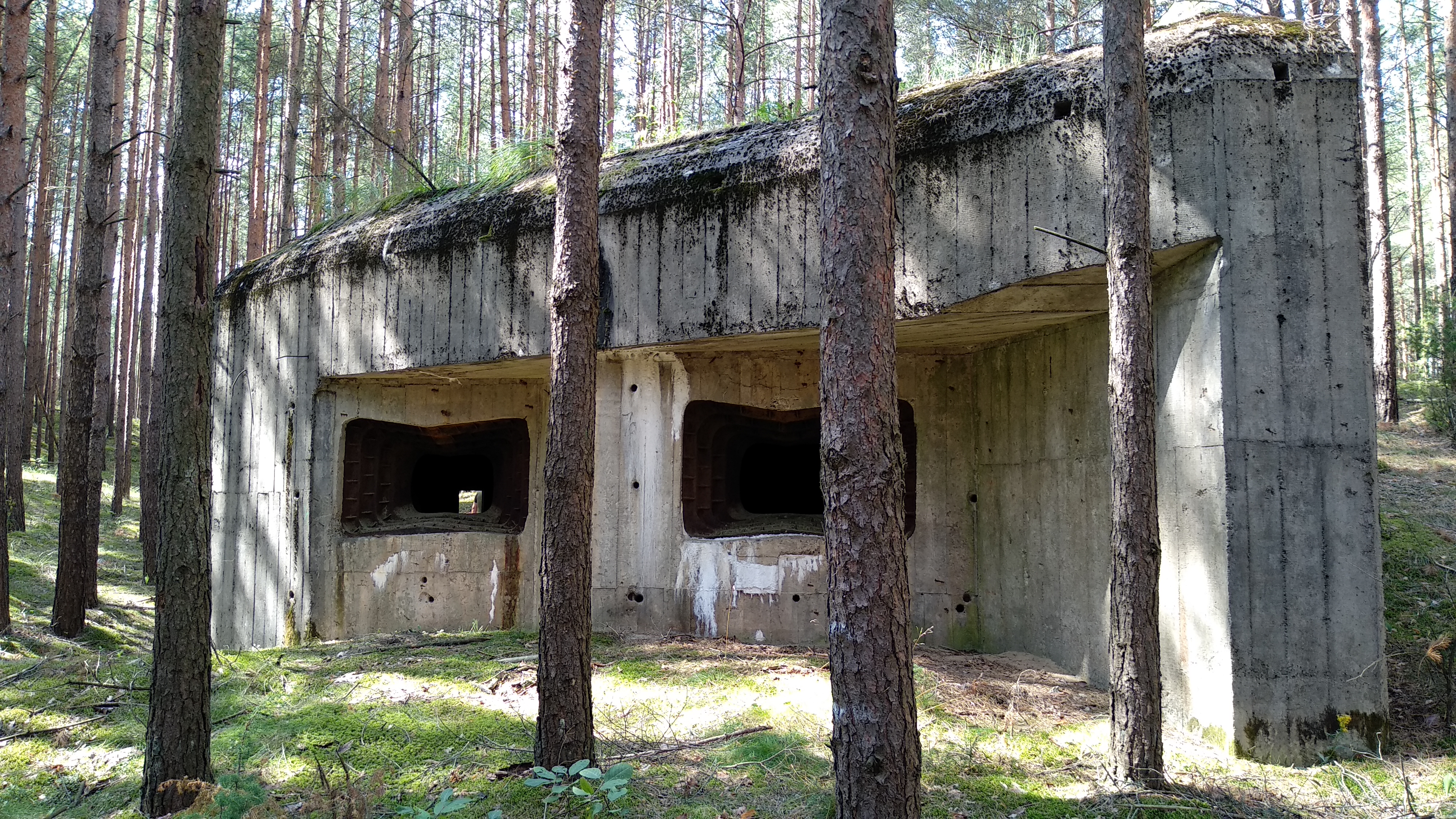
Molotov Line bunker with embrasures for two 76 mm guns (L-17). Near Wołkusz, Poland. Part of Grodno fortified region

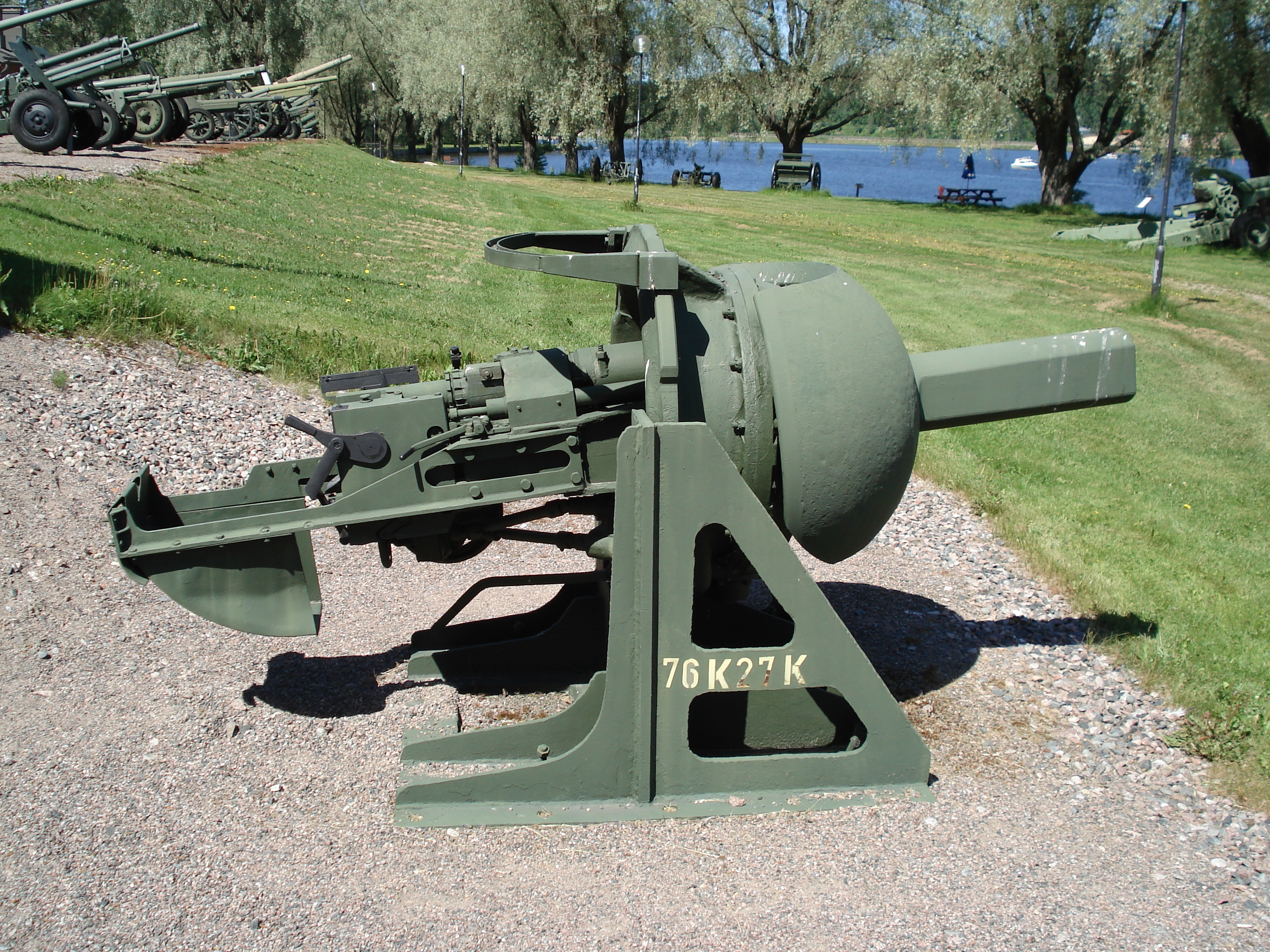
76 mm L-17 bunker gun of the type that was used to equip some bunkers of the Molotov Line

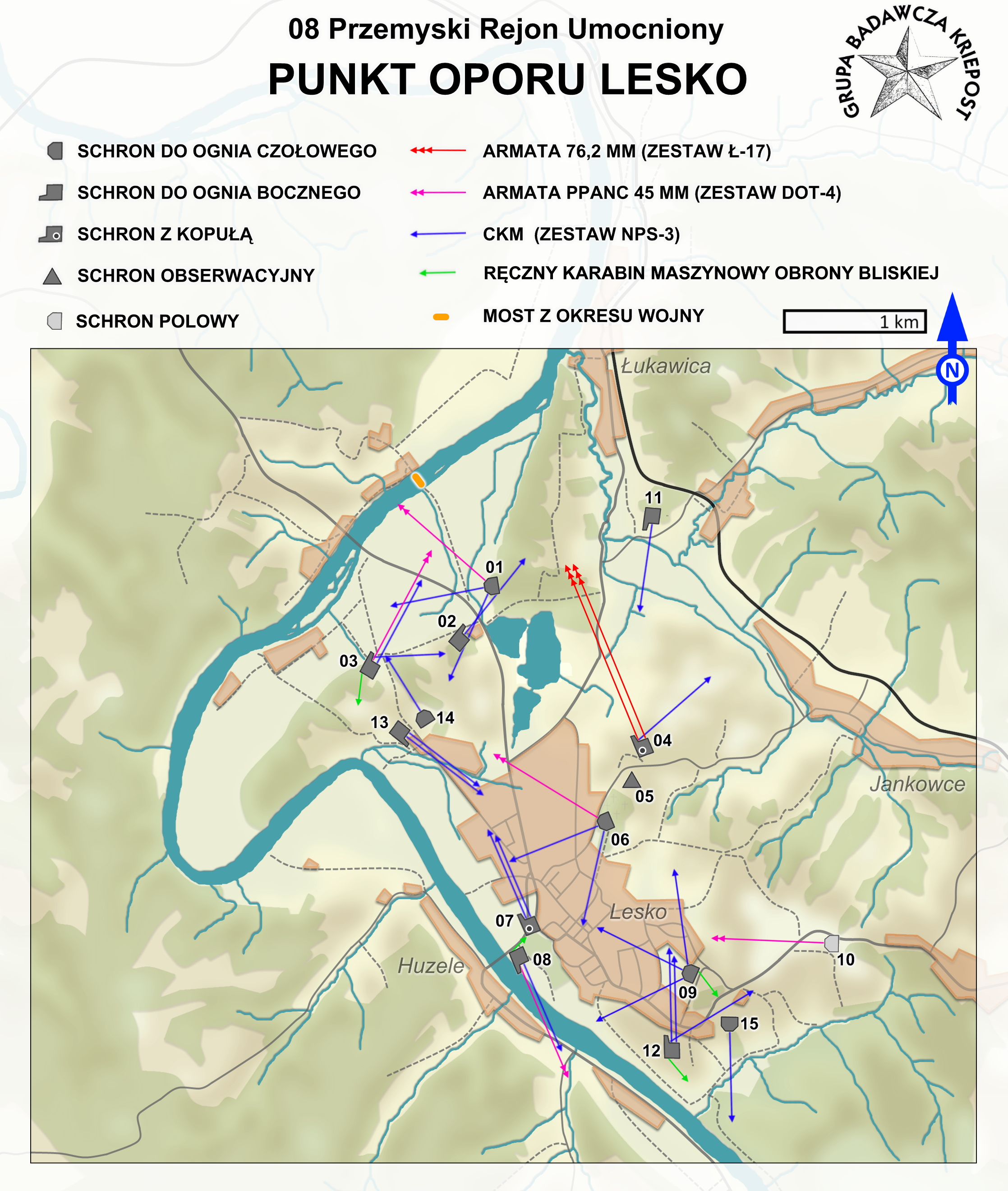
Diagram of bunkers and their field of fire in the centre of resistance Lesko, part of Przemyśl fortified region

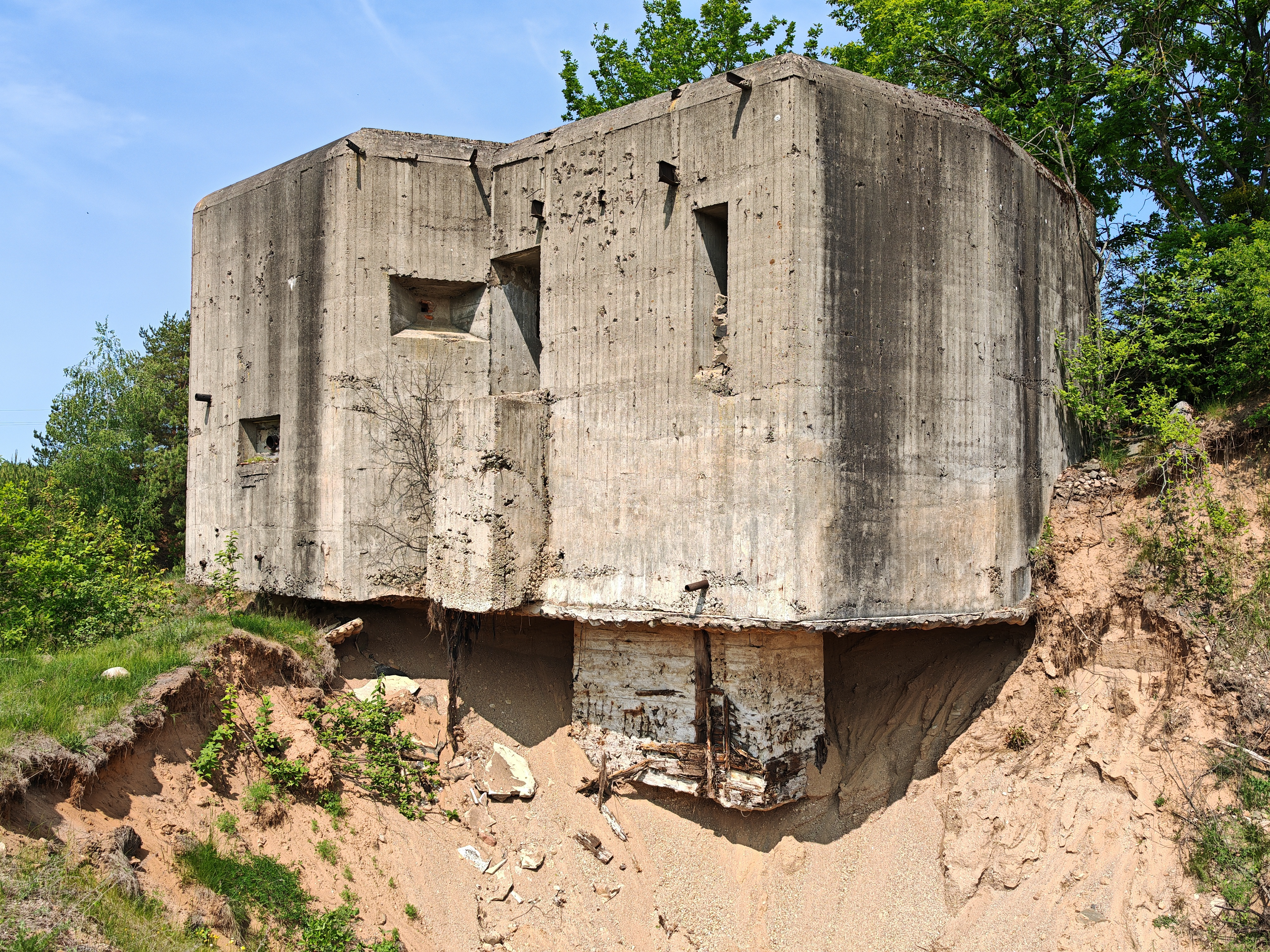
Molotov Line bunker with heavily eroded base, exposing the foundation. Near Hamulka, Poland

The Molotov Line (Russian: Линия Молотова, romanized: Liniya Molotova) is an informal name for the system of border fortified regions built in the Soviet Union during 1940–1941 along its new western borders established after the occupation of the Baltic States, Eastern Poland and Bessarabia in 1940. It was to replace the Stalin Line fortifications along the previous western Soviet border.

== Description ==
The line stretched from the Baltic Sea to the Carpathian Mountains. It was made up of thirteen fortified regions, most covering about 100 km of the border, and formed a part of the larger Soviet defence network along its western borders, stretching from the Arctic Ocean to the Black Sea.

Each fortified region (Russian: укреплённый район, romanized: ukreplennyi raion or UR) consisted of a large number of concrete bunkers (pillboxes) armed with machine-guns, antitank guns and artillery. The bunkers were built in groups for mutual support, each group forming a centre of resistance. A dedicated military unit was permanently assigned to man each region.

When the Axis powers attacked the Soviet Union on June 22, 1941 (Operation Barbarossa), most of the line remained unfinished, and hence posed a negligible obstacle to the invading forces. Only the four southernmost regions, partly completed, were able to hamper the advance of the Wehrmacht for a few days. (The Brest Fortress resisted much longer, but it was an older fortification, and technically not part of the Molotov line).

The ruins of these fortifications, many of them well preserved, can be found today in Lithuania, Poland, Belarus and Ukraine. The modern borders are somewhat different from the borders in 1941, and hence some sections of the line do not lie in border zones and are easily accessible. Other sections do lie right along the modern Polish-Ukrainian, Polish-Belarusian and Lithuanian-Russian borders, so access to them may be restricted for reasons of border security.

In Lithuania the line consisted of four fortified regions:

- 1. Telšiai fortified region (line from Palanga to Judrėnai, 75 kilometers, 8 centers of resistance, 23 bunkers built and 366 under construction on June 22, 1941).
- 2. Šiauliai fortified region (line from Pajūris to Jurbarkas, 90 kilometers, 6 centers of resistance, 27 bunkers built and 403 under construction).
- 3. Kaunas fortified region (line from Jurbarkas to Kalvarija, 105 kilometers, 10 centers of resistance, 31 bunkers built and 599 under construction).
- 4. Alytus fortified region (line from Kalvarija to border of Lithuanian SSR, 57 kilometers, 5 centers of resistance, 20 bunkers built and 273 under construction).

Overall 101 bunkers were built in Lithuania but many were not fully completed. They were significantly vulnerable and could be neutralised quickly by throwing grenades or burning fuel into periscope shafts, which were absolutely unprotected.

Continuing south, the other regions, today located along the eastern border of Poland with Belarus and Ukraine, were:

- 5. Grodno fortified region – 80 km, 9 centers of resistance, 42/98/606 bunkers operational/built/under construction on June 22, 1941 (in Belarus and Poland)
- 6. Osowiec fortified region – 60 km, 8 centers of resistance, 35/59/594 (in Poland)
- 7. Zambrów fortified region – 70 km, 10 centers of resistance, 30/53/550 (in Poland)
- 8. Brest fortified region – 120 km, 10 centers of resistance, 49/128/380 (in Poland and Belarus)
- 9. Kovel fortified region – 80 km, 9 centers of resistance, 138 bunkers under construction (in Ukraine)
- 10. Volodymyr fortified region – 60 km, 7 centers of resistance, 97/97/141 (in Ukraine)
- 11. Kamyanka-Buzka (Kamionka Strumiłowa) fortified region – 45 km, 5 centers of resistance, 84/84/180 (in Ukraine)
- 12. Rawa Ruska fortified region – 90 km, 13 centers of resistance, 95/95/306 (in Poland and Ukraine)
- 13. Przemyśl fortified region – 120 km, 9 centers of resistance, 99/99/186 over 140 bunkers were built (in Poland and Ukraine)

The name Molotov Line is informal and has come into use relatively recently. Viktor Suvorov popularised the term, notably in his book Icebreaker.

== See also ==
- Stalin Line
