= Jasionowo, Augustów County =

Jasionowo
- Village
- Location within Poland
- Coordinates: 53°45′44″N 23°30′29″E
- Country: Poland
- Voivodeship: Podlaskie
- County: Augustów
- Gmina: Lipsk
- Population (2017): 23
- Time zone: UTC+1 (CET)
  - Summer (DST): UTC+2 (CEST)
- Postal code: 16-315
- Area code: +48 87
- Vehicle registration: BAU

Jasionowo [jaɕɔˈnɔvɔ] is a village in the administrative district of Gmina Lipsk, within Augustów County, Podlaskie Voivodeship, in north-eastern Poland, close to the border with Belarus. It is located within the historic Suwałki Region (Suwalszczyzna).

== History ==
In 1827, the village had a population of 47.

During the German occupation of Poland (World War II), on 2 August 1943, the Germans pacified the village in an act of anti-Polish revenge after losing an officer in a battle with the Polish resistance. They surrounded the village and shot all the captured villagers, i.e. 58 Poles, including 19 children, and destroyed houses and outbuildings.
