= Rogożynek =

- Village
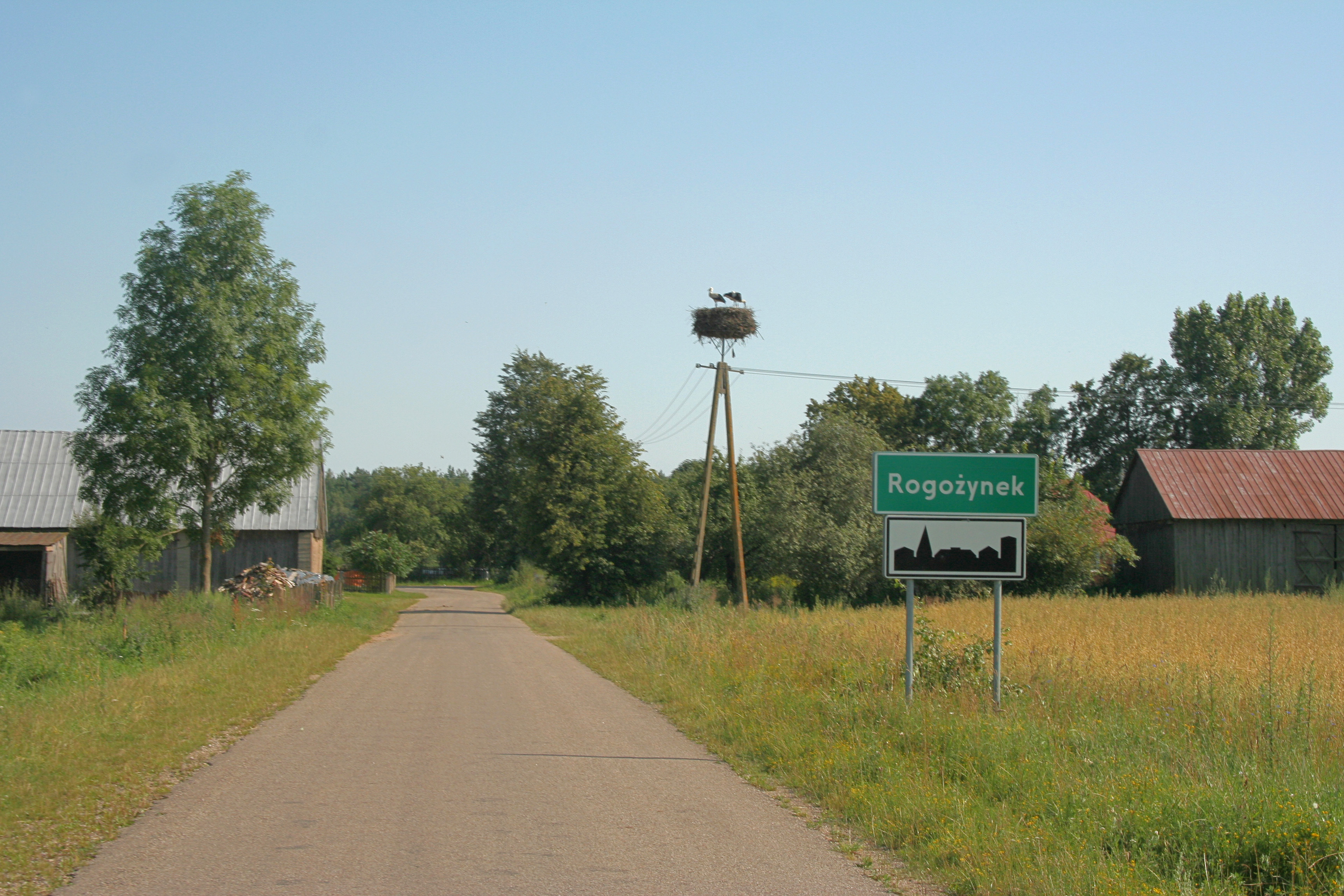

- Location within Poland
- Coordinates: 53°50′08″N 23°31′25″E
- Country: Poland
- Voivodeship: Podlaskie
- County: Augustów
- Gmina: Lipsk

Rogożynek [rɔɡɔˈʐɨnɛk] is a village in the administrative district of Gmina Lipsk, within Augustów County, Podlaskie Voivodeship, in north-eastern Poland, close to the border with Belarus.
