= Marianna Biernacka =

Polish Roman Catholic martyr (1888 – 1943)

Blessed Marianna Biernacka
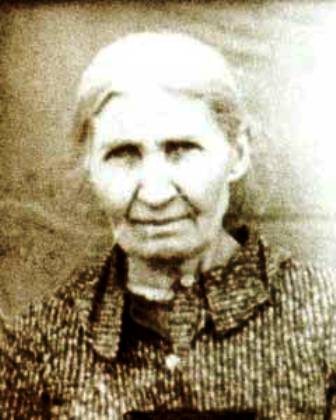
- Photo of Bl. Biernacka in the 1930s

Martyr
- Born: 1888
- Died: July 13, 1943 (aged 54–55); Navumavichy
- Venerated in: Roman Catholic Church Belarusian Greek Catholic Church
- Beatified: 13 June 1999, Warsaw, Poland by Pope John Paul II

Marianna Biernacka, née Czokało (1888 – 13 July 1943) was a Roman Catholic citizen of Poland, and a victim of Nazi Germany in the Second World War. She is one of the beatified 108 Martyrs of World War II, a group also known as the 108 Blessed Polish Martyrs (Polish: 108 błogosławionych męczenników).

== Biography ==
Marianna married a farmer and had six children, but only two of them survived infancy. In 1943, during the Second World War, her son Stanisław and his wife were arrested by German soldiers. In retaliation for the death of other German soldiers that had been killed in a nearby village, the husband and wife Anna were singled out to be shot. Marianna offered to take the place of her pregnant daughter in-law (the couple already had a two-year-old daughter named Genia), and the soldiers agreed. After two weeks of imprisonment, Marianna was shot and killed on 13 July, 1943, in Naumowicze (Naumovichi), Belarus. Her last request was to hold her rosary, which was granted.

Anna lived to age 98. Their descendants still live in the area.

== Beatification ==
On 13 June 1999, Marianna was beatified and recognised as a martyr, along with 107 other victims, by Pope John Paul II in Warsaw, Poland.

There are two parishes in Poland named for the 108 Martyrs of World War II, one in Powiercie in Koło County, and another in Malbork.
