= Stare Leśne Bohatery =

- Village
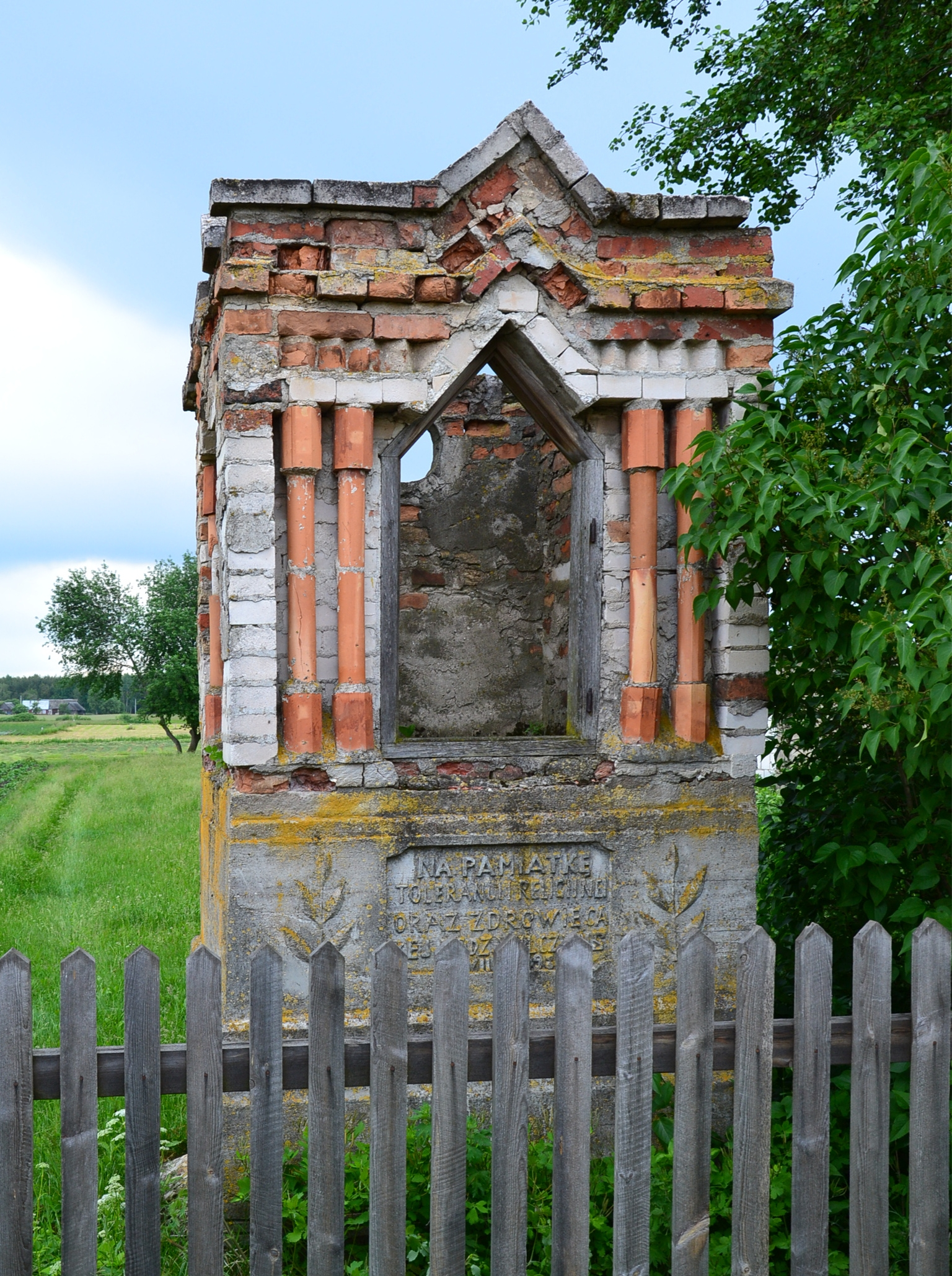

- Location within Poland
- Coordinates: 53°47′47″N 23°32′2″E
- Country: Poland
- Voivodeship: Podlaskie
- County: Augustów
- Gmina: Lipsk

Stare Leśne Bohatery [ˈstarɛ ˈlɛɕnɛ bɔxaˈtɛrɨ] is a village in the administrative district of Gmina Lipsk, within Augustów County, Podlaskie Voivodeship, in north-eastern Poland, close to the border with Belarus.

== Name ==
The name of the settlement originates from Belarusian: багатыр, which means "rich man". There is also a settlement Polnyja Bahatyry on the Belarusian side of the border.
