= Wołkusz =

- Village
- Location within Poland
- Coordinates: 53°48′N 23°32′E
- Country: Poland
- Voivodeship: Podlaskie
- County: Augustów
- Gmina: Lipsk

Wołkusz [ˈvɔu̯kuʂ] is a village in the administrative district of Gmina Lipsk, within Augustów County, Podlaskie Voivodeship, in north-eastern Poland, close to the border with Belarus.

== History ==
Its creation dates back to the years 1562-1569, in which the Wołkusz manor house was built (as the seat of the Perstuń forester) to service the surrounding villages of osoczniks - guards of the royal forest (Leśne Bohatery, Starożyńce, Kurianka and the peasant village of Skieblewo). Before 1560, a mill was built here on the then important route running from Grodno to Prussia. The mill served the above-mentioned Osock villages.

In 1667, the manor in Wołkusz and the entire Perstuńska and Przełomska Primeval Forests were handed over by King Jan Kazimierz to Camaldolese from Wigry, who started intensive forest exploitation here and charged high fees for the right to enter the forest and use the meadows; They also opened an inn in Wołkusz. In 1700, the rights of the Camaldolese monks to the forest forests were questioned. Royal Commissioners and them. King Augustus II took from the Camaldolese large part of the lands, incl. the farm and the manor house in Wołkusz, while the abbey owned the mill on the Wołkuszanka river.

A small settlement centered around a mill, a farm and an inn did not develop into a fairly large village until the turn of the 18th and 19th centuries, the reason for which was the migration of farmers from the nearby Osockie village - Leśne Bohatery, which was destroyed by a fire at that time.

An attraction is the monument located in the forest near Wołkusz right on the border with Belarus. It is a symbolic grave of the staff captain Wieczysław Aleksandrowicz, officer of the 29th artillery brigade from the Smolensk Governorate. He died in February 1915 in the fight against the Germans, probably right next to the bridge on Wołkuszanka (there is a memorial chapel there) and his body was moved and buried in the place where the monument stands. After the war, the father, also a tsarist officer, took his son's body to be buried in his homeland, and in the place of the grave he erected a monument with an inscription crowned with a huge cross.
