= Skieblewo =

- Village
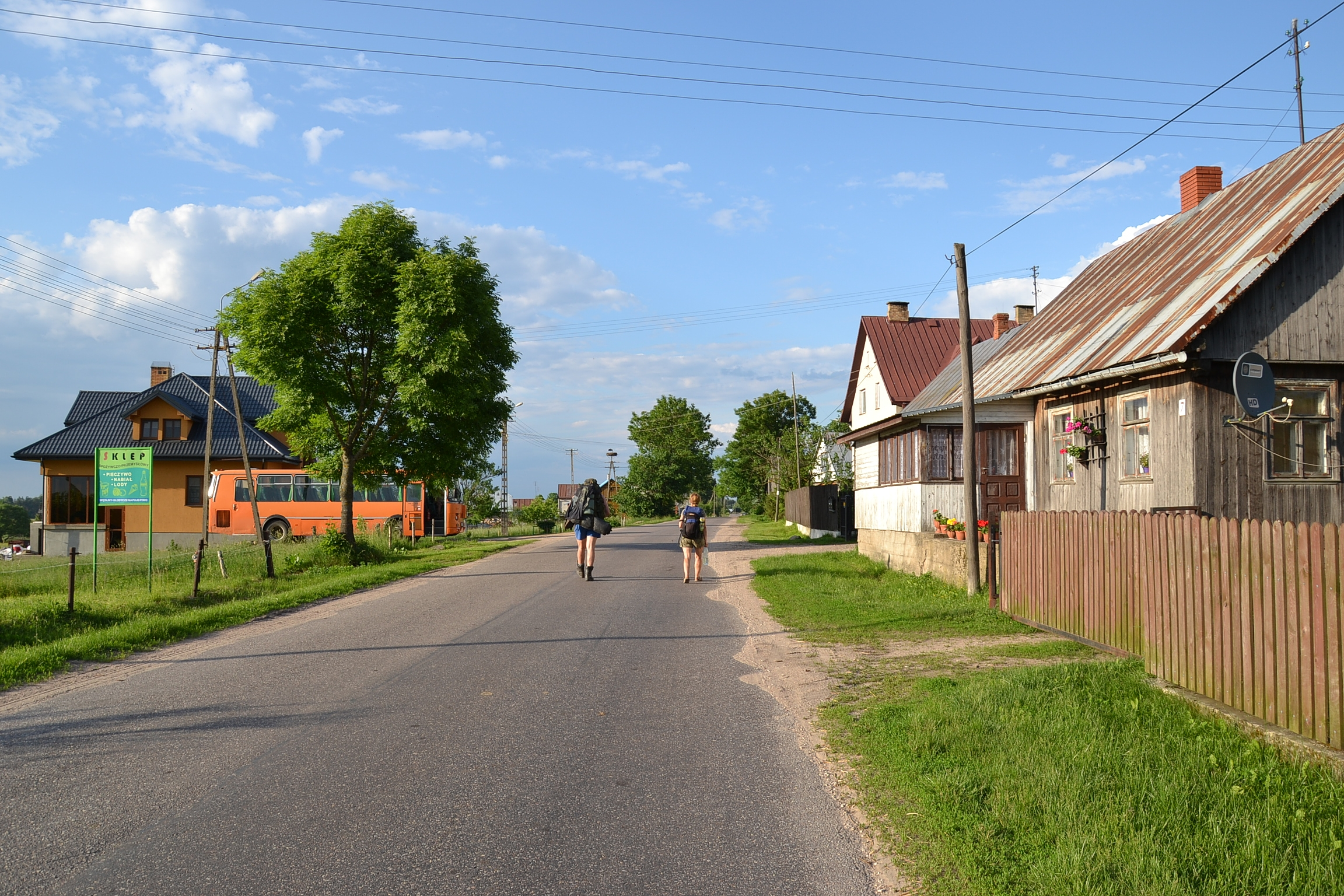
- Main street of Skieblewo

- Location within Poland
- Coordinates: 53°46′N 23°25′E
- Country: Poland
- Voivodeship: Podlaskie
- County: Augustów
- Gmina: Lipsk

Skieblewo [skʲɛˈblɛvɔ] is a village in the administrative district of Gmina Lipsk, within Augustów County, Podlaskie Voivodeship, in north-eastern Poland, close to the border with Belarus.
