= Polkowo, Podlaskie Voivodeship =

Polkowo
- Village
- Location within Poland
- Coordinates: 53°37′38″N 22°55′7″E
- Country: Poland
- Voivodeship: Podlaskie
- County: Augustów
- Gmina: Sztabin

Polkowo [pɔlˈkɔvɔ] is a village in the administrative district of Gmina Sztabin, within Augustów County, province of Podlaskie Voivodeship, in north-eastern Poland. It lies on the Netta River, 2 "viorsts" (approximately 2 kilometers) from the outlet to the Biebrza river. The village stands on one of the few small dry islands emerging from the extensive muddy banks of the Biebrza and the Netta rivers. Polkowo is 28 "viorsts" from Augustów.

== History ==
The village was founded on June 23, 1582 within the boundaries of the Polish–Lithuanian Commonwealth, during the incidence of slave-raiding from the Ottoman Empire and Crimean (Tatar) Khanate (preceded by the Golden Horde). A Suwałki County official issued a decree from the city of Rajgrod (northwest of Polkowo) granting peasants Mark (Markowie) and Elizabeth (Elzbiece) Konoza (Konozie) the right to settle on the hillock of Polikow (later referred to as the village of Polkowo) near the river Biebrza (current day Biebrza National Park).

== Additional Chronology ==
May 3, 1585 ° Queen Anna issued a decree from Warsaw confirming the initial land grant

1587 ° Boundaries of Polkowo were determined to be 5 wlok (approximately 150 acres)

September 13, 1639 ° Rajgrod court lowered rent for land from 50 to 10 Polish zloty

1661 ° Land grant reaffirmed by King Kazimierz

1664 ° Descendants thrived and multiplied consisting of five families

== Conflict ==
In 1777 an armed conflict arose when a landlord of the royal estates chose to impose on the citizens of Polkowo demands for labor, additional payments and higher rents; these citizens initiated a lawsuit (litigants included Mateusz and Marianna Kawalkow Konoza) in the royal court which took several years to resolve; allegations were that the landlord conducted raids of the village, taking oxen, horses and personal possessions; they were also accused of assaults.

In 1778 the court sent a special commission to investigate, which found for the villagers and relieved them of additional requirements. An appeal suspended the ruling.

In 1781 a subsequent commission again held for the villagers, but their lease payments were increased to 200 Polish zloty; "Polkowianie" (the people of Polkowo) at that time consisted of 20 hamlets. In the late eighteenth century the villages of Polkowo, Kopytkowo and Jasionowo, were collectively referred to as [the district of] Bojary.

In 1827, Polkowo consisted of 29 homes and 170 inhabitants, and in 1888 it had 37 homes, 361 inhabitants.
