= Szczeberka (river) =

Location
- Country: Poland

Physical characteristics
- Mouth
  - location: Blizna
  - coordinates: 53°54′26″N 22°58′34″E

Basin features
- Progression: Blizna→ Rospuda→ Netta→ Biebrza→ Narew→ Vistula→ Baltic Sea

Szczeberka is a river of Poland, a tributary of the river Blizna north of Augustów.
