= Żmojdak =

- Village
- Location within Poland
- Coordinates: 53°41′54″N 23°2′32″E
- Country: Poland
- Voivodeship: Podlaskie
- County: Augustów
- Gmina: Sztabin

Żmojdak [ˈʐmɔi̯dak] is a village in the administrative district of Gmina Sztabin, within Augustów County, Podlaskie Voivodeship, in north-eastern Poland. It lies approximately 6 km (4 mi) west of Sztabin, 18 km (11 mi) south of Augustów, and 66 km (41 mi) north of the regional capital Białystok.
