= Lipowo, Gmina Sztabin =

Lipowo
- Village
- Location within Poland
- Coordinates: 53°39′28″N 23°0′50″E
- Country: Poland
- Voivodeship: Podlaskie
- County: Augustów
- Gmina: Sztabin

Lipowo [liˈpɔvɔ] is a village in the administrative district of Gmina Sztabin, within Augustów County, Podlaskie Voivodeship, in northeastern Poland. It is approximately 8 km (5 mi) southwest of Sztabin, 22 km (14 mi) south of Augustów, and 61 km (38 mi) north of the regional capital Białystok.
