= Chomaszewo =

- Village
- Location within Poland
- Coordinates: 53°44′51″N 23°1′34″E
- Country: Poland
- Voivodeship: Podlaskie
- County: Augustów
- Gmina: Sztabin

Chomaszewo [xɔmaˈʂɛvɔ] is a village in the administrative district of Gmina Sztabin, within Augustów County, Podlaskie Voivodeship, in north-eastern Poland.
