= Gruszki =

Gruszki may refer to the following places:

- Gruszki, Lesser Poland Voivodeship (south Poland)
- Gruszki, Augustów County in Podlaskie Voivodeship (north-east Poland)
- Gruszki, Hajnówka County in Podlaskie Voivodeship (north-east Poland)
