= Kopanica, Gmina Płaska =

Kopanica
- Village
- Location within Poland
- Coordinates: 53°54′11″N 23°22′59″E
- Country: Poland
- Voivodeship: Podlaskie
- County: Augustów
- Gmina: Płaska

Kopanica [kɔpaˈnit͡sa] is a village in the administrative district of Gmina Płaska, within Augustów County, Podlaskie Voivodeship, in north-eastern Poland, close to the border with Belarus.
