= EWY =

EWY, Ewý, or Ewy may refer to:

== Ewy ==
- Ewy, a village in Podlaskie Voivodeship, Poland
- Ewy Lake, a lake in Watonwan County, Minnesota, United States
- Ewy, nickname for Australian rules footballer Hannah Ewings (born 2004)

== Ewý ==
- Ewý Architekci (Ewy Architects), winner of the 2005 SARP Award of the Year

== EWY ==
- EWY, abbreviation for "expressway" appearing in Kāpiti Expressway signage
- EWY, NYSE Arca code for iShares MSCI Korea Index, an American exchange-traded fund
