= Rogowo (disambiguation) =

Rogowo may refer to the following places:

- Rogowo in Kuyavian-Pomeranian Voivodeship (north-central Poland)
- Rogowo, Toruń County in Kuyavian-Pomeranian Voivodeship (north-central Poland)
- Rogowo, Rypin County in Kuyavian-Pomeranian Voivodeship (north-central Poland)
- Rogowo, Augustów County in Podlaskie Voivodeship (north-east Poland)
- Rogowo, Białystok County in Podlaskie Voivodeship (north-east Poland)
- Rogowo, Maków County in Masovian Voivodeship (east-central Poland)
- Rogowo, Gmina Bulkowo in Masovian Voivodeship (east-central Poland)
- Rogowo, Gmina Staroźreby in Masovian Voivodeship (east-central Poland)
- Rogowo, Greater Poland Voivodeship (west-central Poland)
- Rogowo, Pomeranian Voivodeship (north Poland)
- Rogowo, Elbląg County in Warmian-Masurian Voivodeship (north Poland)
- Rogowo, Gmina Miłomłyn in Warmian-Masurian Voivodeship (north Poland)
- Rogowo, Gmina Morąg in Warmian-Masurian Voivodeship (north Poland)
- Rogowo, Białogard County in West Pomeranian Voivodeship (north-west Poland)
- Rogowo, Gryfice County in West Pomeranian Voivodeship (north-west Poland)
- Rogowo, Łobez County in West Pomeranian Voivodeship (north-west Poland)
- Rogowo, Stargard County in West Pomeranian Voivodeship (north-west Poland)
