= Czarny Las, Podlaskie Voivodeship =

Czarny Las
- Village
- Location within Poland
- Coordinates: 53°39′54″N 23°4′2″E
- Country: Poland
- Voivodeship: Podlaskie
- County: Augustów
- Gmina: Sztabin

Czarny Las [ˈt͡ʂarnɨ ˈlas] is a village in the administrative district of Gmina Sztabin, within Augustów County, Podlaskie Voivodeship, in north-eastern Poland.
