= Szlamica =

Szlamica Belarusian: Шляміца

Location
- Countries: Poland, Belarus

Physical characteristics
- Source: Czarna Hańcza
  - location: Rygol, Augustów County, Podlaskie Voivodeship
  - coordinates: 53°53′37″N 23°24′58″E
- Mouth: Marycha
  - location: north of Kaliety, Grodno district, Grodno region
  - coordinates: 53.927°N 23.600°E

Basin features
- Progression: Marycha→ Czarna Hańcza→ Neman→ Baltic Sea

Szlamica (Belarusian: Шляміца, romanized: Shlyamitsa) is a river of Poland and Belarus, a tributary of the Marycha. It branches off the Czarna Hańcza near Rygol, northeastern Poland, flows through the lakes Głębokie and Szlamy and crosses the Belarusian border. It flows into the Marycha near the village Kalety, Grodno District.
