= Hanus =

Hanus may refer to:

== Places ==
- Hanus, Poland, a settlement in the administrative district of Gmina Płaska, within Augustów County, Podlaskie Voivodeship.

== People ==
=== Given name ===
- Hanuš Burger (1909-90), Czech film and theatre director
- Hanus Kamban (born 1942), Faroese writer
- Hanus G. Johansen (born 1950), Faroese singer-songwriter
- Hanus Thorleifsson (born 1985), Faroese footballer

=== Family name ===
- Danielle Hanus (born 1988), Canadian swimmer
- Emmerich Hanus (1884-1956), Austrian actor
- František Hanus (actor) (1916-91), Czech actor
- František Hanus (footballer) (born 1982), Czech footballer
- Kevin Hanus (born 1993), German motorcyclist
- Heinz Hanus (1882-1972), Austrian film director
- Jerome Hanus (born 1940), American Catholic prelate

== See also ==
- Hanuš (disambiguation)
