= Mogilnice =

- Village
- Location within Poland
- Coordinates: 53°38′57″N 22°58′14″E
- Country: Poland
- Voivodeship: Podlaskie
- County: Augustów
- Gmina: Sztabin

Mogilnice [mɔɡilˈnit͡sɛ] is a village in the administrative district of Gmina Sztabin, within Augustów County, Podlaskie Voivodeship, in north-eastern Poland.
