= Długie, Podlaskie Voivodeship =

Długie
- Village
- Location within Poland
- Coordinates: 53°45′20″N 23°8′3″E
- Country: Poland
- Voivodeship: Podlaskie
- County: Augustów
- Gmina: Sztabin

Długie [ˈdwuɡʲɛ] is a village in the administrative district of Gmina Sztabin, within Augustów County, Podlaskie Voivodeship, in north-eastern Poland.
