= Janówek, Podlaskie Voivodeship =

Janówek
- Village
- Location within Poland
- Coordinates: 53°41′20″N 23°2′53″E
- Country: Poland
- Voivodeship: Podlaskie
- County: Augustów
- Gmina: Sztabin

Janówek [jaˈnuvɛk] is a village in the administrative district of Gmina Sztabin, within Augustów County, Podlaskie Voivodeship, in north-eastern Poland.
