= Lebiedzin, Augustów County =

Lebiedzin
- Village
- Location within Poland
- Coordinates: 53°44′34″N 23°10′23″E
- Country: Poland
- Voivodeship: Podlaskie
- County: Augustów
- Gmina: Sztabin

Lebiedzin [lɛˈbjɛd͡ʑin] is a village in the administrative district of Gmina Sztabin, within Augustów County, Podlaskie Voivodeship, in north-eastern Poland.
