= Księży Mostek =

- Settlement
- Location within Poland
- Coordinates: 53°56′33″N 23°17′42″E
- Country: Poland
- Voivodeship: Podlaskie
- County: Augustów
- Gmina: Płaska

Księży Mostek [ˈkɕɛ̃ʐɨ ˈmɔstɛk] is a settlement in the administrative district of Gmina Płaska, within Augustów County, Podlaskie Voivodeship, in north-eastern Poland, close to the border with Belarus.
