= Balinka =

Balinka may refer to:

- Balinka, Hungary, a village in Fejér County
- Balinka, Poland, a village in Podlaskie Voivodeship
- Balinka pit, a pit in Mount Pištenik, Croatia
- Balinka (river), a river in the Czech Republic, tributary of the Oslava
