= Huta, Augustów County =

Huta
- Village
- Location within Poland
- Coordinates: 53°43′26″N 23°3′20″E
- Country: Poland
- Voivodeship: Podlaskie
- County: Augustów
- Gmina: Sztabin

Huta [ˈxuta], (Lithuanian: Ūta), is a village in the administrative district of Gmina Sztabin, within Augustów County, Podlaskie Voivodeship, in north-eastern Poland.
