= Wilcze Bagno =

- Village
- Location within Poland
- Coordinates: 53°45′46″N 23°17′34″E
- Country: Poland
- Voivodeship: Podlaskie
- County: Augustów
- Gmina: Sztabin

Wilcze Bagno [ˈvilt͡ʂɛ ˈbaɡnɔ] is a village in the administrative district of Gmina Sztabin, within Augustów County, Podlaskie Voivodeship, in north-eastern Poland. The name literally translates as "wolves' swamp".
