= Fiedorowizna =

- Village
- Location within Poland
- Coordinates: 53°43′N 23°5′E
- Country: Poland
- Voivodeship: Podlaskie
- County: Augustów
- Gmina: Sztabin

Fiedorowizna [fjɛdɔrɔˈvizna] is a village in the administrative district of Gmina Sztabin, within Augustów County, Podlaskie Voivodeship, in north-eastern Poland.
