= Mołowiste =

- Village
- Location within Poland
- Coordinates: 53°55′N 23°13′E
- Country: Poland
- Voivodeship: Podlaskie
- County: Augustów
- Gmina: Płaska

Mołowiste [mɔwɔˈvistɛ] is a village in the administrative district of Gmina Płaska, within Augustów County, Podlaskie Voivodeship, in north-eastern Poland, close to the border with Belarus.
