= Jasionowo Dębowskie =

- Village
- Location within Poland
- Coordinates: 53°35′22″N 22°53′45″E
- Country: Poland
- Voivodeship: Podlaskie
- County: Augustów
- Gmina: Sztabin

Jasionowo Dębowskie [jaɕɔˈnɔvɔ dɛmˈbɔfskʲɛ] is a village in the administrative district of Gmina Sztabin, within Augustów County, Podlaskie Voivodeship, in north-eastern Poland. According to the 2011 census, the population was 66 people.
