= Kopiec, Podlaskie Voivodeship =

Kopiec
- Village
- Location within Poland
- Coordinates: 53°42′17″N 22°59′21″E
- Country: Poland
- Voivodeship: Podlaskie
- County: Augustów
- Gmina: Sztabin
- Population: 120

Kopiec [ˈkɔpjɛt͡s] is a village in the administrative district of Gmina Sztabin, within Augustów County, Podlaskie Voivodeship, in north-eastern Poland.
