= Jastrzębna Pierwsza =

- Village
- Location within Poland
- Coordinates: 53°43′42″N 23°14′4″E
- Country: Poland
- Voivodeship: Podlaskie
- County: Augustów
- Gmina: Sztabin
- Population: 310

Jastrzębna Pierwsza [jasˈtʂɛmbna ˈpjɛrfʂa] is a village in the administrative district of Gmina Sztabin, within Augustów County, Podlaskie Voivodeship, in north-eastern Poland.
