= Muły, Augustów County =

Muły
- Village
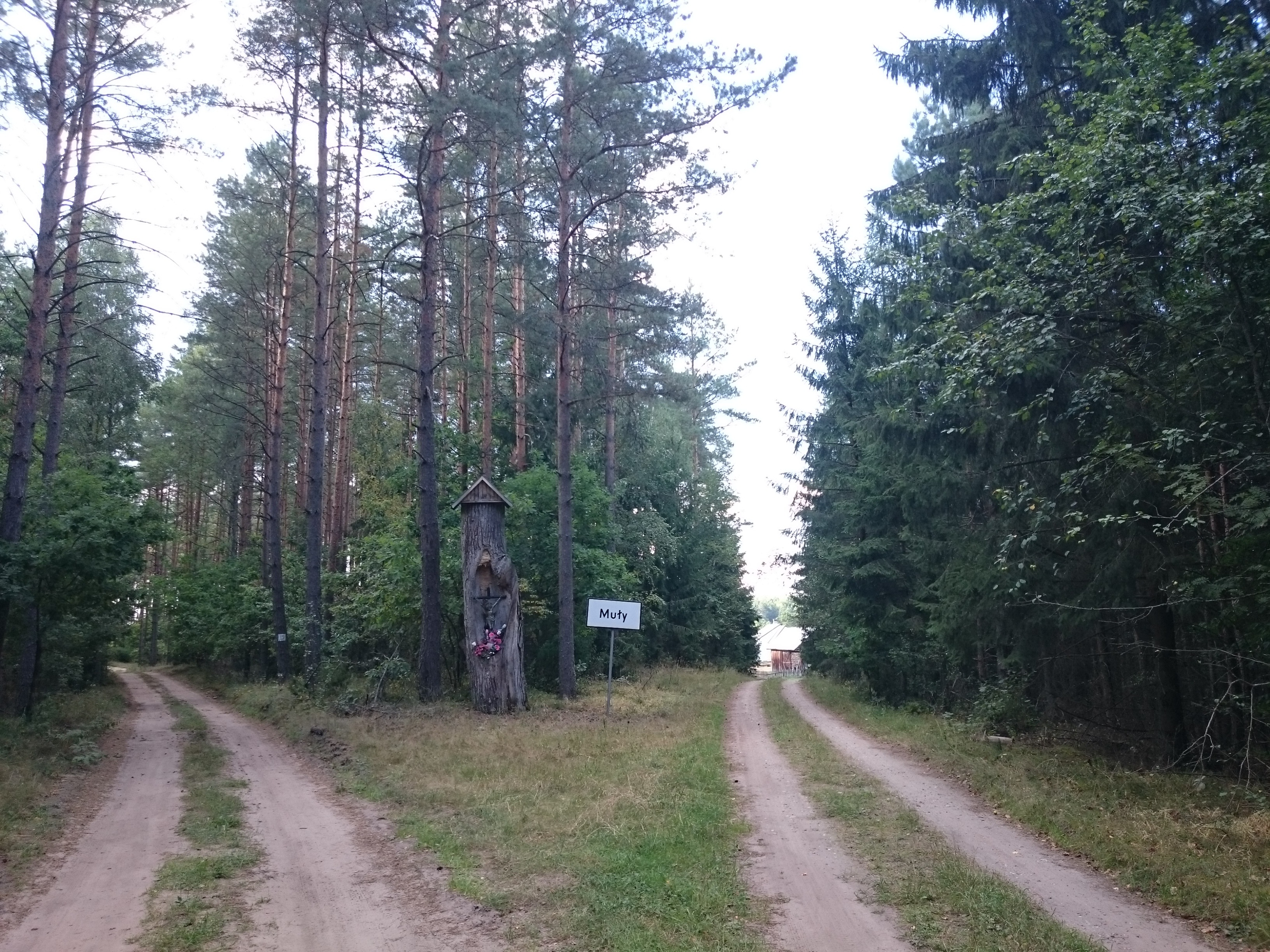

- Location within Poland
- Coordinates: 53°54′5″N 23°29′7″E
- Country: Poland
- Voivodeship: Podlaskie
- County: Augustów
- Gmina: Płaska
- Population: 20

Muły [ˈmuwɨ] is a village in the administrative district of Gmina Płaska, within Augustów County, Podlaskie Voivodeship, in north-eastern Poland, close to the border with Belarus.
