= Rubcowo =

- Village
- Location within Poland
- Coordinates: 53°48′41″N 23°26′54″E
- Country: Poland
- Voivodeship: Podlaskie
- County: Augustów
- Gmina: Płaska
- Population: 120
- Time zone: UTC+1 (CET)
  - Summer (DST): UTC+2 (CEST)

Rubcowo [rupˈt͡sɔvɔ] is a village in the administrative district of Gmina Płaska, within Augustów County, Podlaskie Voivodeship, in north-eastern Poland, close to the border with Belarus.

During the German occupation of Poland (World War II), on 24 November 1939, four Polish foresters from Rubcowo were murdered by the Germans in the prison in Suwałki as part of the Intelligenzaktion.
