= Gorczyca, Podlaskie Voivodeship =

Gorczyca
- Village
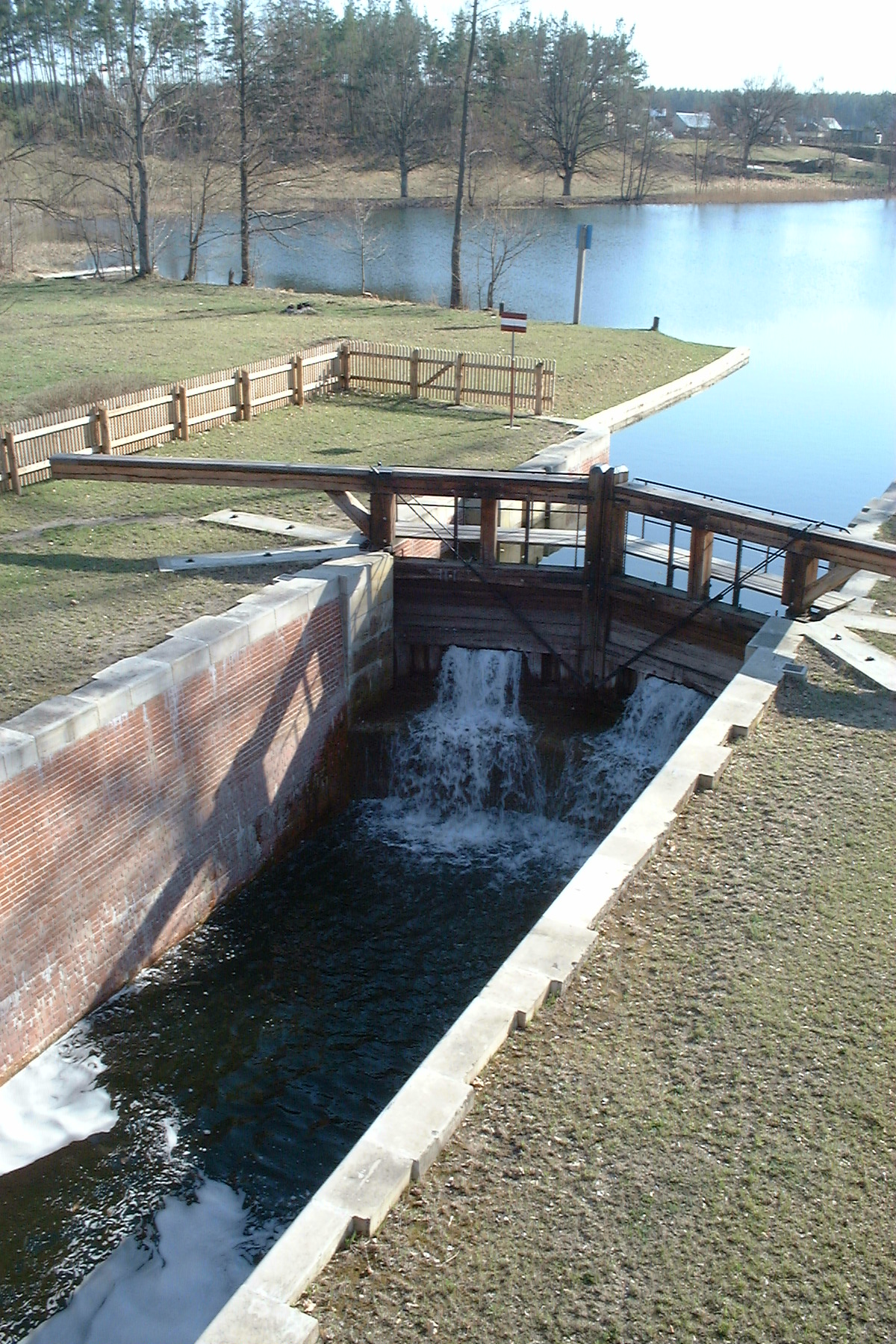

- Location within Poland
- Coordinates: 53°54′47″N 23°16′13″E
- Country: Poland
- Voivodeship: Podlaskie
- County: Augustów
- Gmina: Płaska
- Population: 180

Gorczyca [ɡɔrˈt͡ʂɨt͡sa] is a village in the administrative district of Gmina Płaska, within Augustów County, Podlaskie Voivodeship, in north-eastern Poland, close to the border with Belarus.
