= Budziski, Augustów County =

Budziski
- Village
- Location within Poland
- Coordinates: 53°43′32″N 23°1′50″E
- Country: Poland
- Voivodeship: Podlaskie
- County: Augustów
- Gmina: Sztabin
- Population: 11

Budziski [buˈd͡ʑiski] is a village in the administrative district of Gmina Sztabin, within Augustów County, Podlaskie Voivodeship, in north-eastern Poland.
