= Klonowo, Podlaskie Voivodeship =

Klonowo
- Settlement
- Location within Poland
- Coordinates: 53°41′25″N 22°58′53″E
- Country: Poland
- Voivodeship: Podlaskie
- County: Augustów
- Gmina: Sztabin

Klonowo [klɔˈnɔvɔ] is a settlement in the administrative district of Gmina Sztabin, within Augustów County, Podlaskie Voivodeship, in north-eastern Poland.
