= Kolonie Jasionowo =

- Village
- Location within Poland
- Coordinates: 53°42′21″N 23°04′55″E
- Country: Poland
- Voivodeship: Podlaskie
- County: Augustów
- Gmina: Sztabin

Kolonie Jasionowo [kɔˈlɔɲɛ jaɕɔˈnɔvɔ] is a village in the administrative district of Gmina Sztabin, within Augustów County, Podlaskie Voivodeship, in north-eastern Poland.
