= Wilkownia =

- Village
- Location within Poland
- Coordinates: 53°47′4″N 23°16′11″E
- Country: Poland
- Voivodeship: Podlaskie
- County: Augustów
- Gmina: Sztabin
- Population: 20

Wilkownia [vilˈkɔvɲa] is a village in the administrative district of Gmina Sztabin, within Augustów County, Podlaskie Voivodeship, in north-eastern Poland.
