= Krasnoborki =

- Village
- Location within Poland
- Coordinates: 53°41′42″N 23°7′54″E
- Country: Poland
- Voivodeship: Podlaskie
- County: Augustów
- Gmina: Sztabin

Krasnoborki [krasnɔˈbɔrki] is a village in the administrative district of Gmina Sztabin, within Augustów County, Podlaskie Voivodeship, in north-eastern Poland.
