= Osienniki =

- Village
- Location within Poland
- Coordinates: 53°51′42″N 23°30′3″E
- Country: Poland
- Voivodeship: Podlaskie
- County: Augustów
- Gmina: Płaska

Osienniki [ɔɕɛnˈniki] is a village in the administrative district of Gmina Płaska, within Augustów County, Podlaskie Voivodeship, in north-eastern Poland, close to the border with Belarus.
