= Sucha Rzeczka =

- Village
- Location within Poland
- Coordinates: 53°54′N 23°13′E
- Country: Poland
- Voivodeship: Podlaskie
- County: Augustów
- Gmina: Płaska
- Postal code: 16-326
- Vehicle registration: BAU

Sucha Rzeczka [ˈsuxa ˈʐɛt͡ʂka] is a village in the administrative district of Gmina Płaska, within Augustów County, Podlaskie Voivodeship, in north-eastern Poland, close to the border with Belarus.

Four Polish citizens were murdered by Nazi Germany in the village during World War II.
