= Netta (river) =

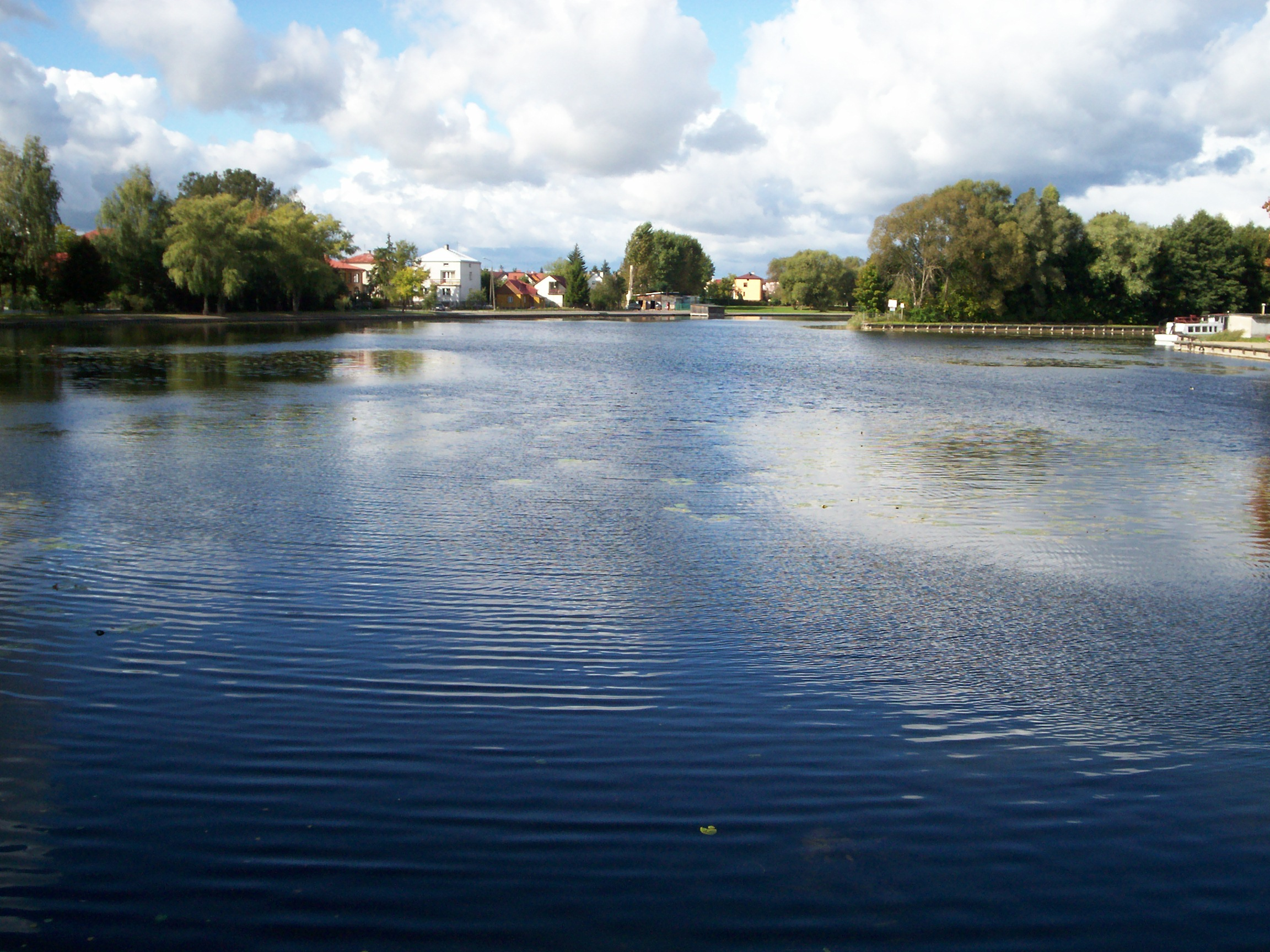

Physical characteristics
- Source
  - location: Lake Necko, Augustów
- Mouth
  - location: Dębowo (confluence with the Biebrza)
  - coordinates: 53.6097°N 22.9319°E
- Length: 20 km (12 mi)

Basin features
- Progression: Biebrza→ Narew→ Vistula→ Baltic Sea

The Netta [ˈnɛtta] is a river in north-east Poland, a right tributary of the Biebrza, approximately 20 kilometres (12 mi) long. It is a continuation of the Rospuda, which flows into Lake Rospuda (connected to Lake Necko) north of the town of Augustów. The Rospuda and Netta together have a length of 102 kilometres (63 mi) and a watershed of 1,336 square kilometres (516 sq mi).

The Netta runs parallel to, or (on its upper and lower stretches) forms part of, the Augustów Canal, built in the 19th century to link the basins of the Vistula and the Neman. It connects to the Vistula via the Biebrza, the Narew and the Bug River. The Netta's main tributaries are the Szczeberka, Kolniczanka, Olszanka and Turówka.

The Netta begins its course in Augustów, where it flows out of Lake Necko and southwards through the town. At Białobrzegi it joins the Turówka and continues southwards, flowing through the districts of Gmina Augustów and Gmina Sztabin. After joining the Olszanka it enters Biebrza National Park. Shortly before its confluence with the Biebrza it passes through the villages of Polkowo and Dębowo.
