= Ostrowie =

Ostrowie may refer to the following places:

- Ostrowie, Augustów County in Podlaskie Voivodeship (north-east Poland)
- Ostrowie, Sokółka County in Podlaskie Voivodeship (north-east Poland)
