= Mały Borek =

- Settlement
- Location within Poland
- Coordinates: 53°51′55″N 23°19′27″E
- Country: Poland
- Voivodeship: Podlaskie
- County: Augustów
- Gmina: Płaska

Mały Borek [ˈmawɨ ˈbɔrɛk] is a settlement in the administrative district of Gmina Płaska, within Augustów County, Podlaskie Voivodeship, in north-eastern Poland, close to the border with Belarus.
