= Krasnybór =

- Village
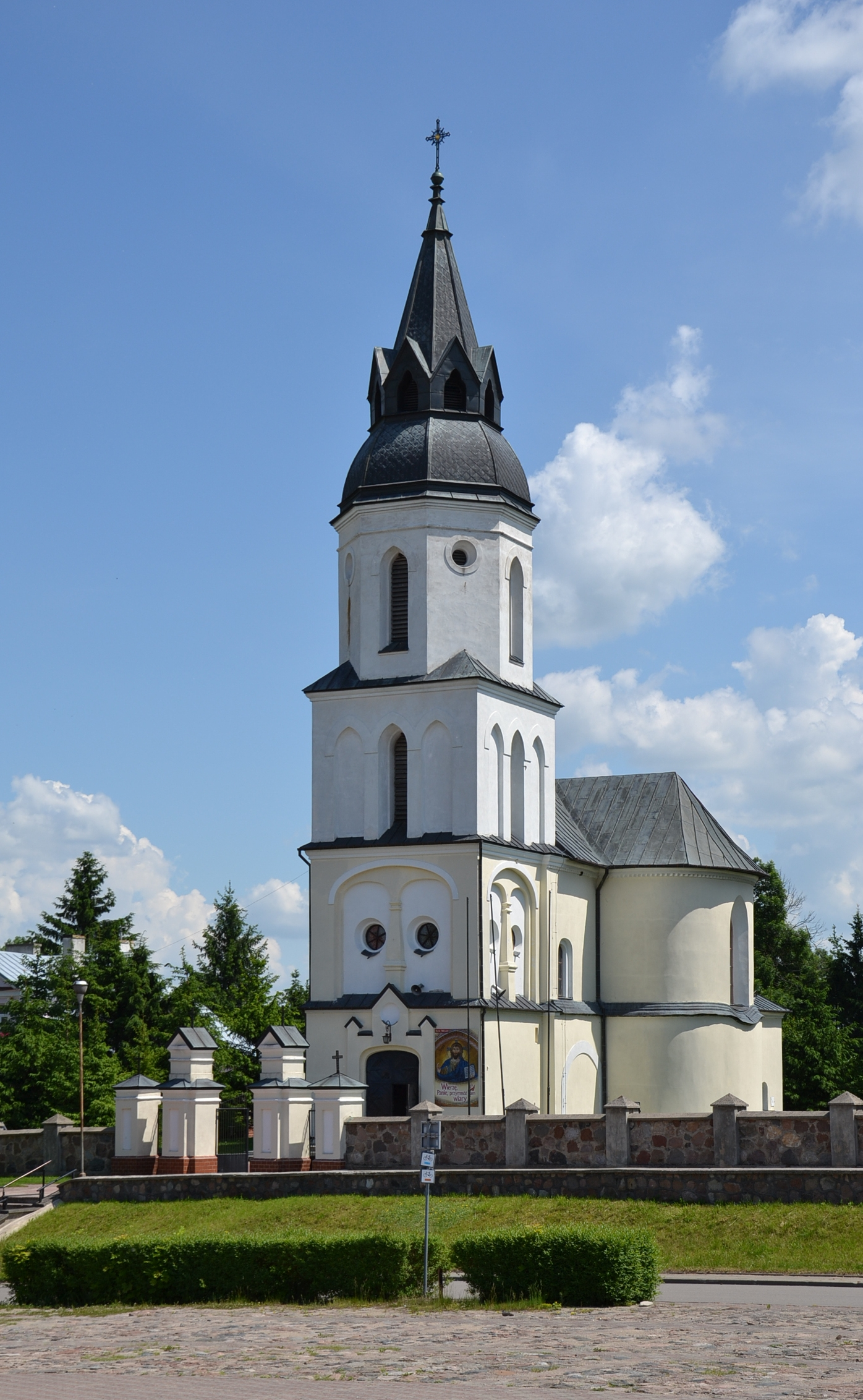
- Church in Krasnybór

- Location within Poland
- Coordinates: 53°43′42″N 23°11′54″E
- Country: Poland
- Voivodeship: Podlaskie
- County: Augustów
- Gmina: Sztabin

Krasnybór [krasˈnɨbur] (Lithuanian: Krasniburas) is a village in the administrative district of Gmina Sztabin, within Augustów County, Podlaskie Voivodeship, in north-eastern Poland.
