= Brzozowe Grądy =

Settlement in Gmina Sztabin, Poland

- Settlement
- Location within Poland
- Coordinates: 53°48′53″N 23°13′16″E
- Country: Poland
- Voivodeship: Podlaskie
- County: Augustów
- Gmina: Sztabin

Brzozowe Grądy [bʐɔˈzɔvɛ ˈɡrɔndɨ] is a settlement in the administrative district of Gmina Sztabin, within Augustów County, Podlaskie Voivodeship, in north-eastern Poland.
