= Komaszówka, Gmina Sztabin =

Komaszówka
- Village
- Location within Poland
- Coordinates: 53°44′18″N 23°11′26″E
- Country: Poland
- Voivodeship: Podlaskie
- County: Augustów
- Gmina: Sztabin

Komaszówka [kɔmaˈʂufka] is a village in the administrative district of Gmina Sztabin, within Augustów County, Podlaskie Voivodeship, in north-eastern Poland.
