= Cisów, Podlaskie Voivodeship =

Cisów
- Village
- Location within Poland
- Coordinates: 53°44′54″N 23°5′49″E
- Country: Poland
- Voivodeship: Podlaskie
- County: Augustów
- Gmina: Sztabin
- Population: 80

Cisów [ˈt͡ɕisuf] is a village in the administrative district of Gmina Sztabin, within Augustów County, Podlaskie Voivodeship, in north-eastern Poland.
