= Jałowy Róg =

- Settlement
- Location within Poland
- Coordinates: 53°54′14″N 23°24′11″E
- Country: Poland
- Voivodeship: Podlaskie
- County: Augustów
- Gmina: Płaska

Jałowy Róg [jaˈwɔvɨ ˈruk] is a settlement in the administrative district of Gmina Płaska, within Augustów County, Podlaskie Voivodeship, in north-eastern Poland, close to the border with Belarus.
