= Trzy Kopce, Podlaskie Voivodeship =

Trzy Kopce
- Village
- Location within Poland
- Coordinates: 53°48′44″N 23°26′56″E
- Country: Poland
- Voivodeship: Podlaskie
- County: Augustów
- Gmina: Płaska

Trzy Kopce [ˈtʂɨ ˈkɔpt͡sɛ] is a village in the administrative district of Gmina Płaska, within Augustów County, Podlaskie Voivodeship, in north-eastern Poland, close to the border with Belarus.
