= Karoliny, Podlaskie Voivodeship =

Karoliny
- Village
- Location within Poland
- Coordinates: 53°41′38″N 23°3′29″E
- Country: Poland
- Voivodeship: Podlaskie
- County: Augustów
- Gmina: Sztabin

Karoliny [karɔˈlinɨ] is a village in the administrative district of Gmina Sztabin, within Augustów County, Podlaskie Voivodeship, in north-eastern Poland.
