= Łubianka, Augustów County =

Łubianka
- Village
- Location within Poland
- Coordinates: 53°40′15″N 23°0′13″E
- Country: Poland
- Voivodeship: Podlaskie
- County: Augustów
- Gmina: Sztabin

Łubianka [wuˈbjaŋka] is a village in the administrative district of Gmina Sztabin, within Augustów County, Podlaskie Voivodeship, in north-eastern Poland.
