= Serski Las =

- Village
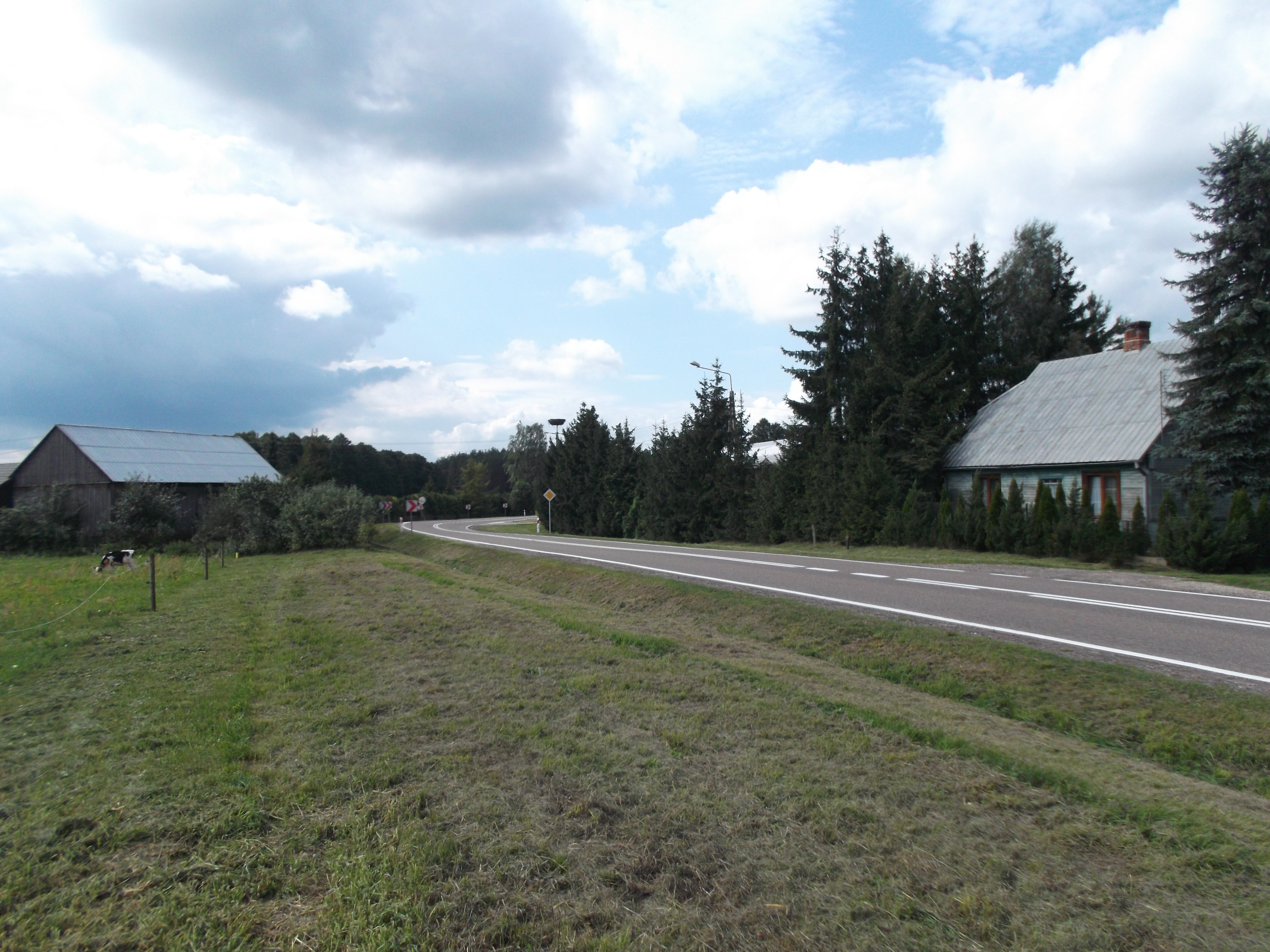

- Location within Poland
- Coordinates: 53°56′N 23°11′E
- Country: Poland
- Voivodeship: Podlaskie
- County: Augustów
- Gmina: Płaska

Serski Las [ˈsɛrski ˈlas] is a village in the administrative district of Gmina Płaska, within Augustów County, Podlaskie Voivodeship, in north-eastern Poland, close to the border with Belarus.
