= Wolne =

- Village
- Location within Poland
- Coordinates: 53°42′30″N 23°9′36″E
- Country: Poland
- Voivodeship: Podlaskie
- County: Augustów
- Gmina: Sztabin

Wolne [ˈvɔlnɛ] is a village in the administrative district of Gmina Sztabin, within Augustów County, Podlaskie Voivodeship, in north-eastern Poland.
