= Balink =

Balink is a Dutch surname. Notable people with the surname include:

- Albert Balink (1906–1976), Dutch journalist and filmmaker
- Henry Balink (1882–1963), Dutch-born American painter, draughtsman, and etcher

== See also ==
- Balinka (disambiguation)
