= Jazy =

Jazy may refer to the following places:

- Jazy, Kuyavian-Pomeranian Voivodeship (north-central Poland)
- Jazy, Augustów County in Podlaskie Voivodeship (north-east Poland)
- Jazy, West Pomeranian Voivodeship (north-west Poland)
- Jazy (river), a tributary of the Kara Darya in southern Kyrgyzstan
