= Strzelcowizna =

- Village
- Location within Poland
- Coordinates: 53°57′N 23°19′E
- Country: Poland
- Voivodeship: Podlaskie
- County: Augustów
- Gmina: Płaska
- Time zone: UTC+1 (CET)
  - Summer (DST): UTC+2 (CEST)
- Vehicle registration: BAU

Strzelcowizna [stʂɛlt͡sɔˈvizna] is a village in the administrative district of Gmina Płaska, within Augustów County, Podlaskie Voivodeship, in north-eastern Poland, close to the border with Belarus.

During World War II, a battle between the Polish partisans of the Home Army and the German occupiers was fought at Strzelcowizna on 15 November 1943.
