= Jaminy =

- Village
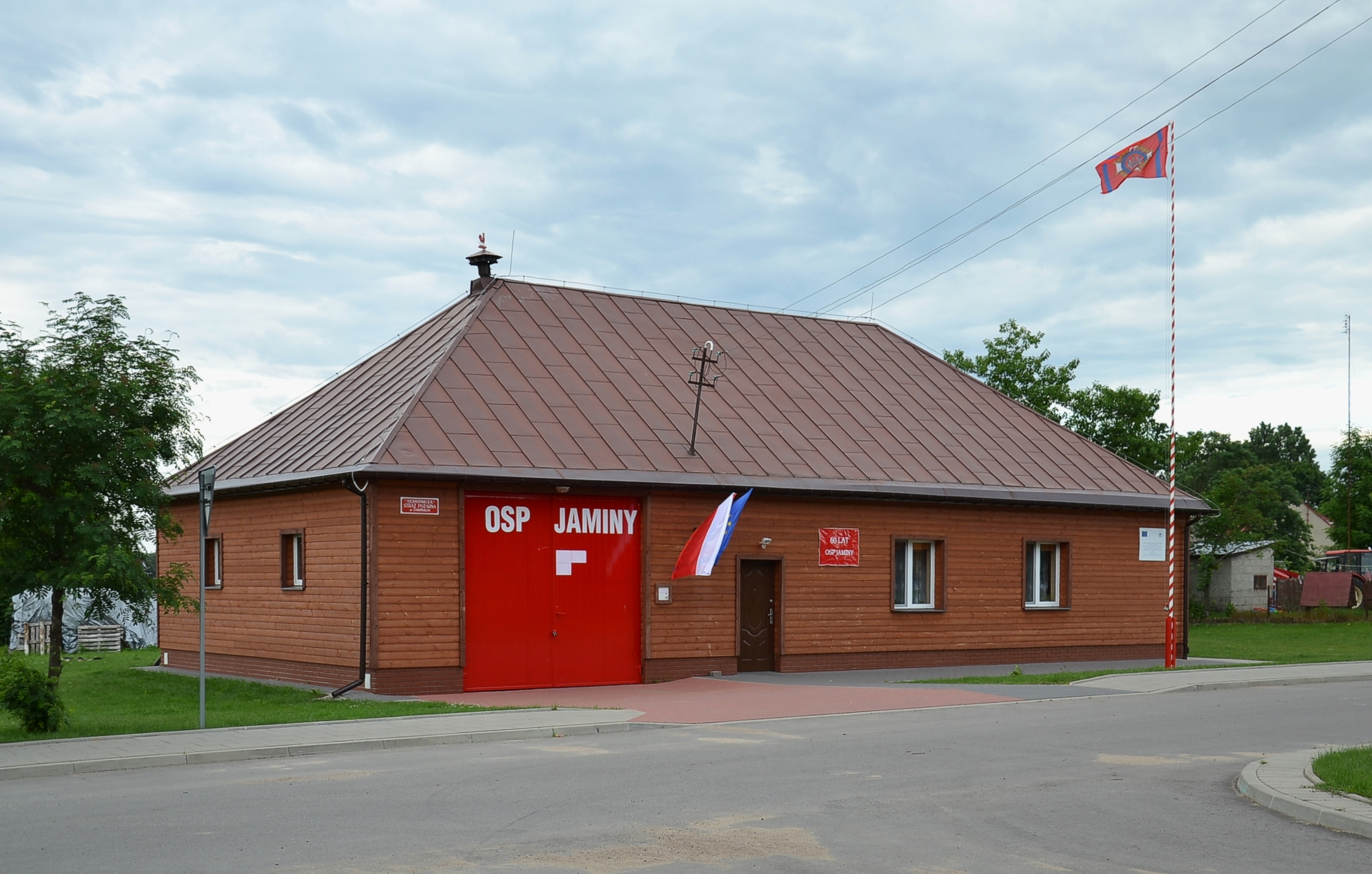
- Fire station in Jaminy

- Location within Poland
- Coordinates: 53°40′N 23°1′E
- Country: Poland
- Voivodeship: Podlaskie
- County: Augustów
- Gmina: Sztabin
- Time zone: UTC+1 (CET)
  - Summer (DST): UTC+2 (CEST)
- Vehicle registration: BAU

Jaminy [jaˈminɨ] is a village in the administrative district of Gmina Sztabin, within Augustów County, Podlaskie Voivodeship, in north-eastern Poland.

== History ==
Following the German-Soviet invasion of Poland, which started World War II in September 1939, the village was initially occupied by the Soviet Union until 1941, and then by Germany until 1944. Afterwards, it was restored to Poland, although with a Soviet-installed communist regime, which stayed in power until the Fall of Communism in the 1980s. The Polish anti-communist resistance was active in Jaminy, and in 1945 it raided a local communist police station.
