= Czarniewo =

- Village

- Location within Poland
- Coordinates: 53°40′N 23°4′E
- Country: Poland
- Voivodeship: Podlaskie
- County: Augustów
- Gmina: Sztabin

Czarniewo [t͡ʂarˈɲɛvɔ] is a village in the administrative district of Gmina Sztabin, within Augustów County, Podlaskie Voivodeship, in north-eastern Poland.
