= Kamień, Augustów County =

Kamień
- Village

- Location within Poland
- Coordinates: 53°42′32″N 23°6′7″E
- Country: Poland
- Voivodeship: Podlaskie
- County: Augustów
- Gmina: Sztabin

Kamień (Polish pronunciation: [ˈkamjɛj̃]) is a village in the administrative district of Gmina Sztabin, within Augustów County, Podlaskie Voivodeship, in north-eastern Poland.
