= Wrotki, Podlaskie Voivodeship =

Wrotki
- Village
- Location within Poland
- Coordinates: 53°42′N 22°59′E
- Country: Poland
- Voivodeship: Podlaskie
- County: Augustów
- Gmina: Sztabin

Wrotki [ˈvrɔtki] is a village in the administrative district of Gmina Sztabin, within Augustów County, Podlaskie Voivodeship, in north-eastern Poland.
