= Andrzejewo =

Andrzejewo may refer to the following places:

- Andrzejewo, Augustów County in Podlaskie Voivodeship (north-east Poland)
- Andrzejewo, Sokółka County in Podlaskie Voivodeship (north-east Poland)
- Andrzejewo, Podlaskie Voivodeship (north-east Poland)
- Andrzejewo, Masovian Voivodeship (east-central Poland)
- Andrzejewo, West Pomeranian Voivodeship (north-west Poland)
