= Dalny Las =

- Village
- Location within Poland
- Coordinates: 53°55′48″N 23°17′14″E
- Country: Poland
- Voivodeship: Podlaskie
- County: Augustów
- Gmina: Płaska
- Population: 187
- Website: http://www.dalnylas.pl/

Dalny Las [ˈdalnɨ ˈlas] is a village in the administrative district of Gmina Płaska, within Augustów County, Podlaskie Voivodeship, in north-eastern Poland, close to the border with Belarus.
