= Grzędy, Podlaskie Voivodeship =

Grzędy
- Village
- Location within Poland
- Coordinates: 53°36′N 22°52′E
- Country: Poland
- Voivodeship: Podlaskie
- County: Augustów
- Gmina: Sztabin

Grzędy [ˈɡʐɛndɨ] is a village in the administrative district of Gmina Sztabin, within Augustów County, Podlaskie Voivodeship, in north-eastern Poland.
