= Lubinowo, Gmina Płaska =

Lubinowo
- Village
- Location within Poland
- Coordinates: 53°50′14″N 23°30′38″E
- Country: Poland
- Voivodeship: Podlaskie
- County: Augustów
- Gmina: Płaska
- Population: 20

Lubinowo [lubiˈnɔvɔ] is a village in the administrative district of Gmina Płaska, within Augustów County, Podlaskie Voivodeship, in north-eastern Poland, close to the border with Belarus.
