= Jastrzębna Druga =

- Village
- Location within Poland
- Coordinates: 53°44′46″N 23°15′54″E
- Country: Poland
- Voivodeship: Podlaskie
- County: Augustów
- Gmina: Sztabin

Jastrzębna Druga [jasˈtʂɛmbna ˈdruɡa] is a village in the administrative district of Gmina Sztabin, within Augustów County, Podlaskie Voivodeship, in north-eastern Poland.
