= Lipiny, Augustów County =

Lipiny
- Settlement
- Location within Poland
- Coordinates: 53°52′37″N 23°30′45″E
- Country: Poland
- Voivodeship: Podlaskie
- County: Augustów
- Gmina: Płaska

Lipiny [liˈpinɨ] is a settlement in the administrative district of Gmina Płaska, within Augustów County, Podlaskie Voivodeship, in north-eastern Poland, close to the border with Belarus.
