= Marycha =

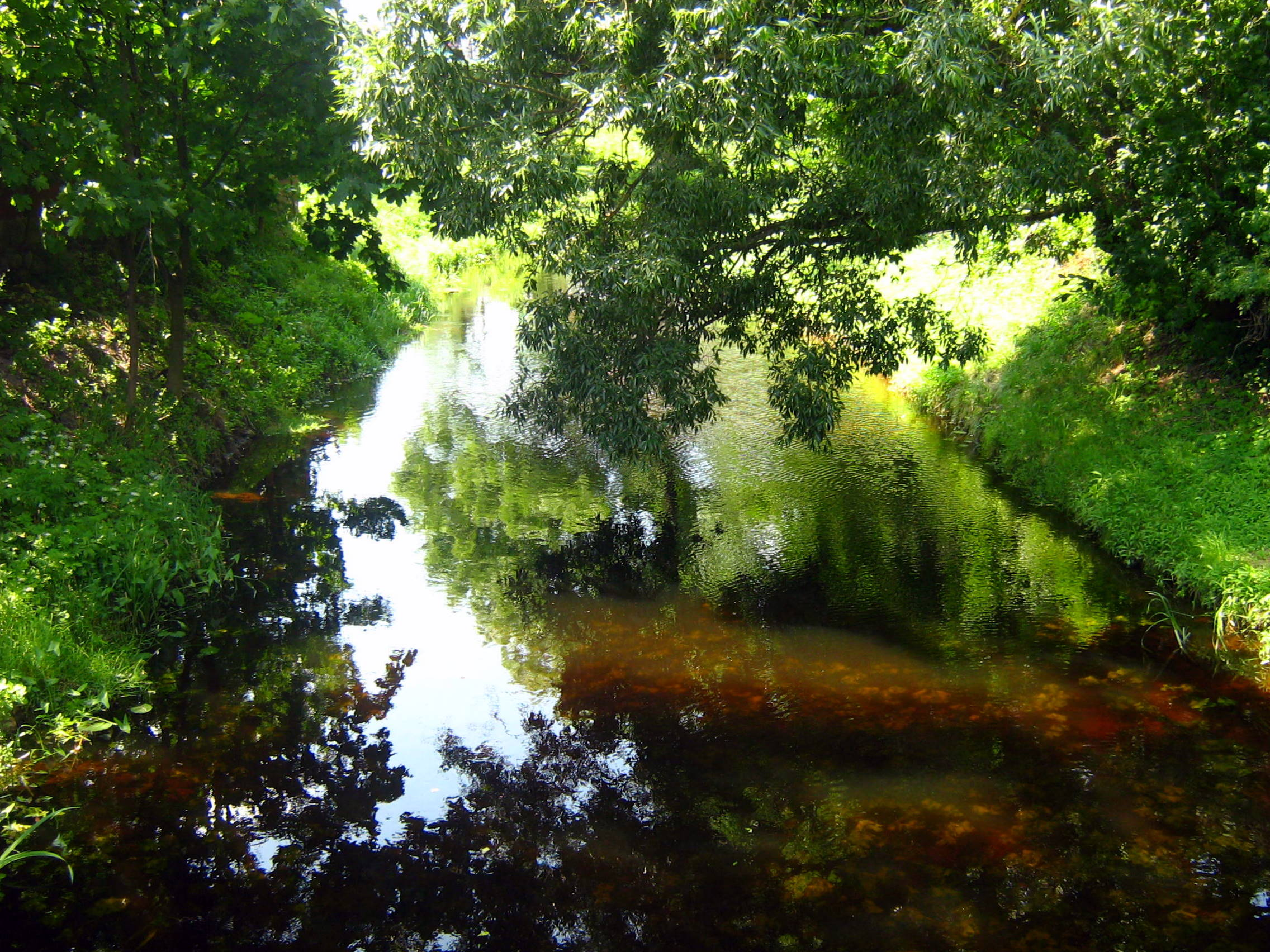
- Marycha near Sejny

Location
- Country: Poland, Lithuania, Belarus

Physical characteristics
- Mouth
  - location: Czarna Hańcza
  - coordinates: 53.903°N 23.648°E
- Length: 80.8 km (50.2 mi)
- Basin size: 432.4 km^{2} (167.0 sq mi)

Basin features
- Progression: Czarna Hańcza→ Neman→ Baltic Sea
- Tributaries
  - left: Szlamica

Marycha (Lithuanian: Seina) is a small river that serves as the natural Polish–Lithuanian and Lithuanian–Belarusian border. It starts around Puńsk, flows through the town of Sejny and passes through Pomorze Lake. It is a tributary of Czarna Hańcza. The river is known for its population of beavers.
