= Jazy, Augustów County =

Jazy
- Village
- Location within Poland
- Coordinates: 53°53′10″N 23°21′58″E
- Country: Poland
- Voivodeship: Podlaskie
- County: Augustów
- Gmina: Płaska
- Population: 20

Jazy [ˈjazɨ] is a village in the administrative district of Gmina Płaska, within Augustów County, Podlaskie Voivodeship, in north-eastern Poland, close to the border with Belarus.
