= Hanuš =

Hanuš is a Czech name, which may be either a given name or a common family name.

== First names ==
- Hanuš Schwaiger (1854–1912), Czech artist
- Hanuš Wihan (1855–1920), Czech cellist
- Jan Růže, also known as Master Hanuš, a Prague blacksmith apocryphally believed to have carried out the most important modification of the Prague astronomical clock
- Hanuš of Lipá (?-1415), was a Bohemian nobleman and landowner, married to Marketa of Sternberka. His name and story have been adapted into an NPC in the game Kingdom Come: Deliverance (2019).

== Family names ==
- Ignác Jan Hanuš (1812–1869), Czech philosopher
- Jan Hanuš (composer) (1915–2004), Czech composer
- Jan Hanuš (footballer) (born 1988), Czech footballer for FK Jablonec
- Josef Hanuš (astronomer) (born 1983), a Czech planetary astronomer
- Josef Jan Hanuš (1911–1992), Czech fighter pilot
- Lumír Ondřej Hanuš (born 1947), Czech analytic chemist
- Miroslav Hanuš (born 1963), Czech actor

== Other uses ==
- 27986 Hanuš, an asteroid named after composer Jan Hanuš

== See also ==
- 66151 Josefhanuš, an asteroid named after the astronomer
- Hanus (disambiguation)
- Hanusch, a surname
