= Hanusch =

Hanusch is a German language surname, written Hanuš in Czech. Notable people with the surname include:

- Ferdinand Hanusch (1866–1923), Austrian politician
- Steve Hanusch (born 1990), German ice hockey player
- Andressa Hanusch (born 1987), brazilian businesswoman.

== See also ==
- Hanuš (disambiguation)
