= Płaska =

- Village
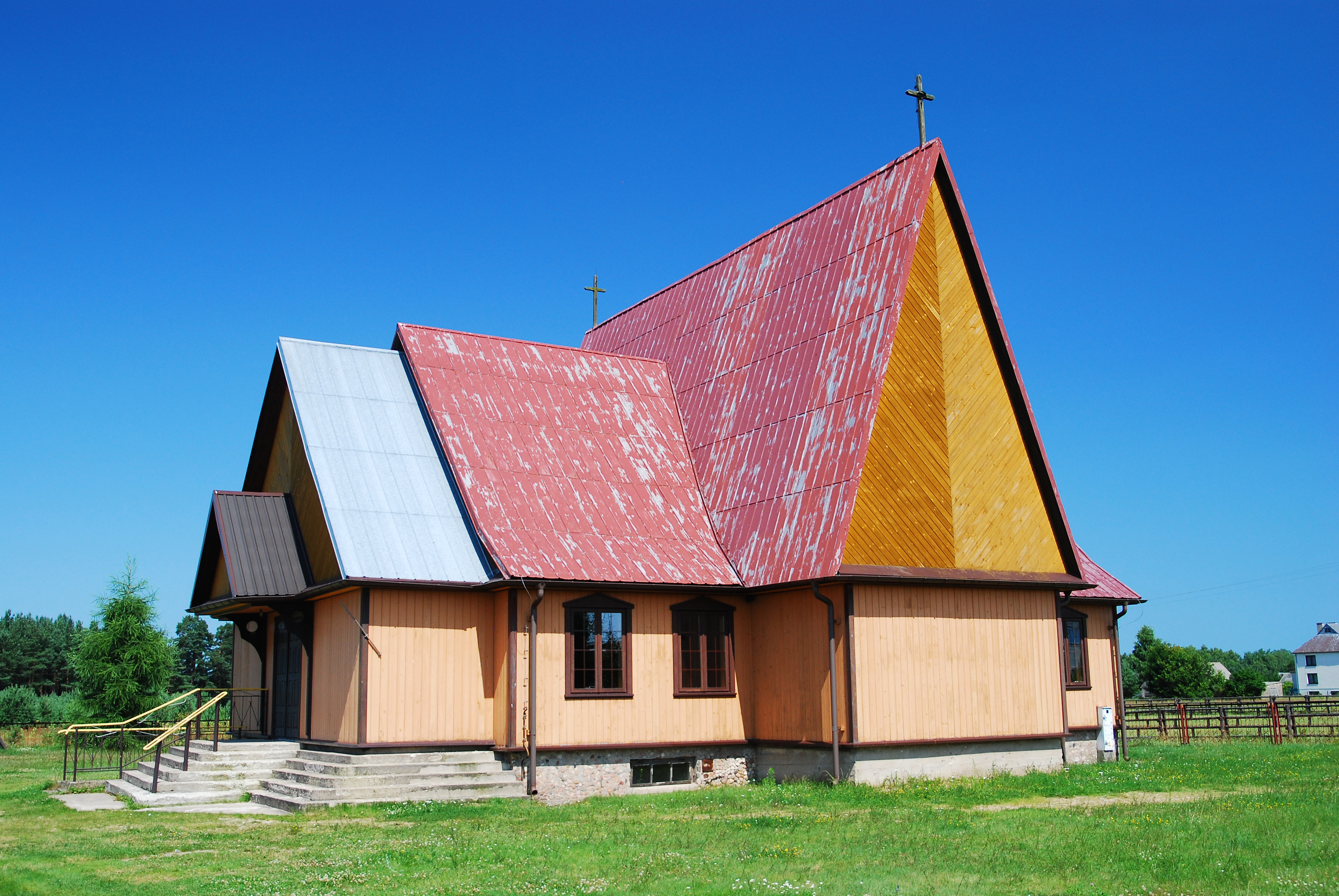
- Chapel in Płaska

- Location within Poland
- Coordinates: 53°54′N 23°15′E
- Country: Poland
- Voivodeship: Podlaskie
- County: Augustów
- Gmina: Płaska
- Population: 370

Płaska [ˈpwaska], (Lithuanian: Plaskai), is a village in Augustów County, Podlaskie Voivodeship, in north-eastern Poland, close to the border with Belarus. It is the seat of the gmina (administrative district) called Gmina Płaska.
