= Gruszki, Augustów County =

Gruszki
- Village
- Location within Poland
- Coordinates: 53°51′N 23°25′E
- Country: Poland
- Voivodeship: Podlaskie
- County: Augustów
- Gmina: Płaska

Gruszki [ˈɡruʂki], (Lithuanian: Gruškos), is a village in the administrative district of Gmina Płaska, within Augustów County, Podlaskie Voivodeship, in north-eastern Poland, close to the border with Belarus.
