= Adrian Krzyżanowski =

Polish mathematician

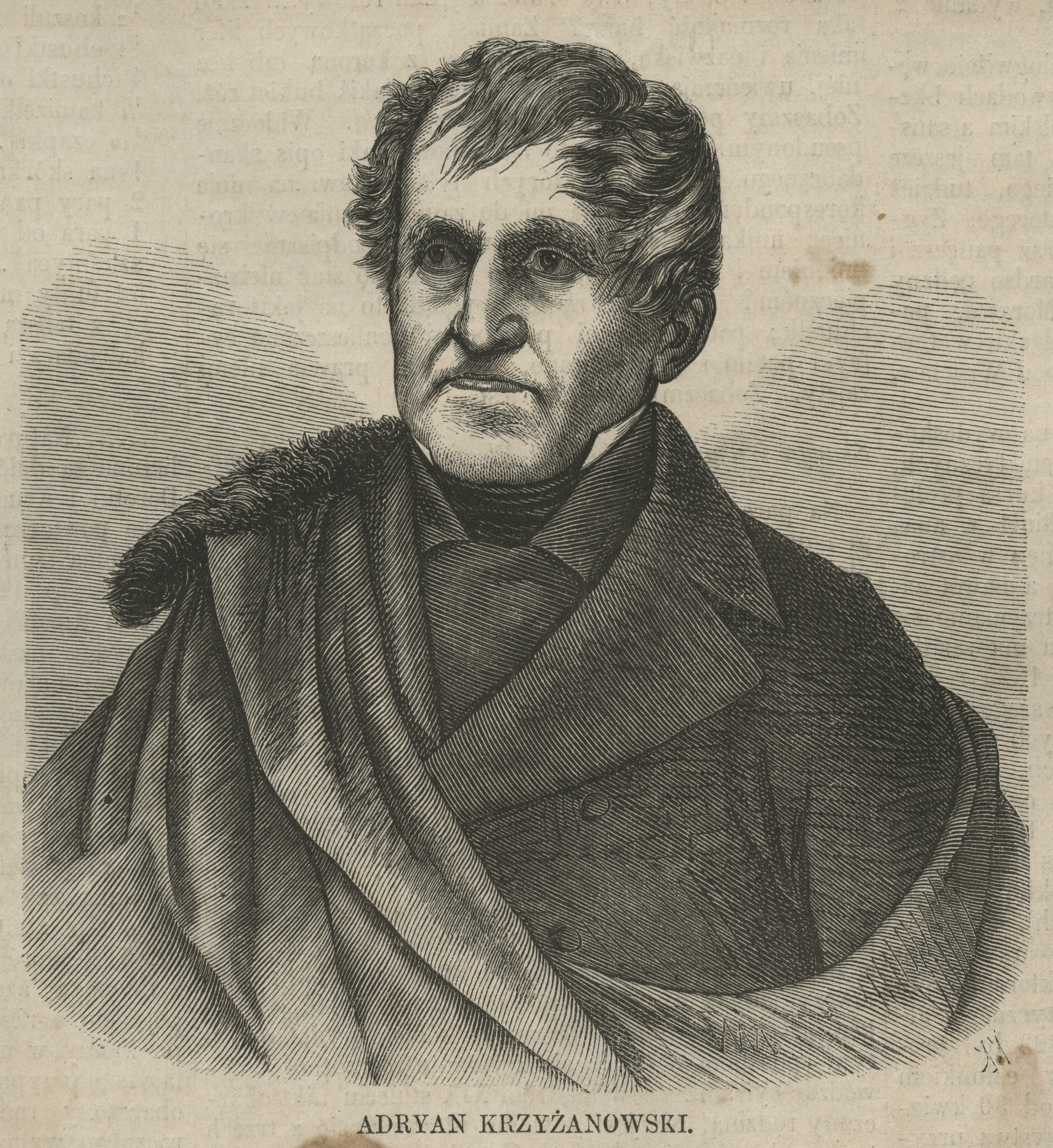

Adrian Krzyżanowski (born 8 September 1788 in Dębowo - died 21 August 1852 in Warsaw) was a Polish mathematician and translator of German literature.

== Life ==
From 1805 to 1810 he taught in a school in Warsaw, then was a professor of mathematics in Radzyń and Płock before studying from 1817 to 1820 in Paris. He was also a professor at the Warsaw Lyceum, which had been founded by Prussia, and at the University of Warsaw.

Krzyżanowski was also involved in the November Uprising after which the university was closed by the Russians. He made a living by translating literature into Polish, for example the German novels of Alexander von Oppeln-Bronikowski.

He also published several articles on Nicolaus Copernicus.

Krzyżanowski died of cholera in 1852 and was buried at the Powązki Cemetery (163, VI).

== Works ==
- De construendis camaris ellipsoidicis ope projectionis graphicae. Dissertatio inauguralis matematico philosophica ąuam pro summis in philosophia honoribus rite conseąuendis, 1821 (O budowie sklepień eliptycznych za pomocą rzutów ukośnych. Rozprawa doktorska.)
- Teorya równań wszech-stopni podług binomu Newtona, 1816
- Geometry a analityczna linii i powierzchni drugiego rzędu, 1822
- O trudnościach zachodzących w wykładzie zasad geometryi elementarnej, 1825
- O rodzinach spółczesnych i zażyłych w Krakowie z Kopernikani, Biblioteka Warszawska (1841) No. 3, pp. 27–40
- Kopernik w Walhalli, in: Rozmaitości, Pismo dodatkowe do Gazety Lwowskiej (1843), No. 16
- Kopernik gehört nicht in die Walhalla. In: Jahrbücher für slavische Literatur, Kunst u. Wissenschaft (Leipzig) 1 (1843), pp. 247–252.
- Copernicus in Walhalla (Kopernik w Walhalli) and Rozprawa o Koperniku (The Life and the Writings of Copernicus) by Jan Sniadecki (1756–1830), in New Quarterly Review; or, home, foreign and colonial journal, Volume 3, 1844 pp. 361–393
