= Balinka, Poland =

Balinka
- Village
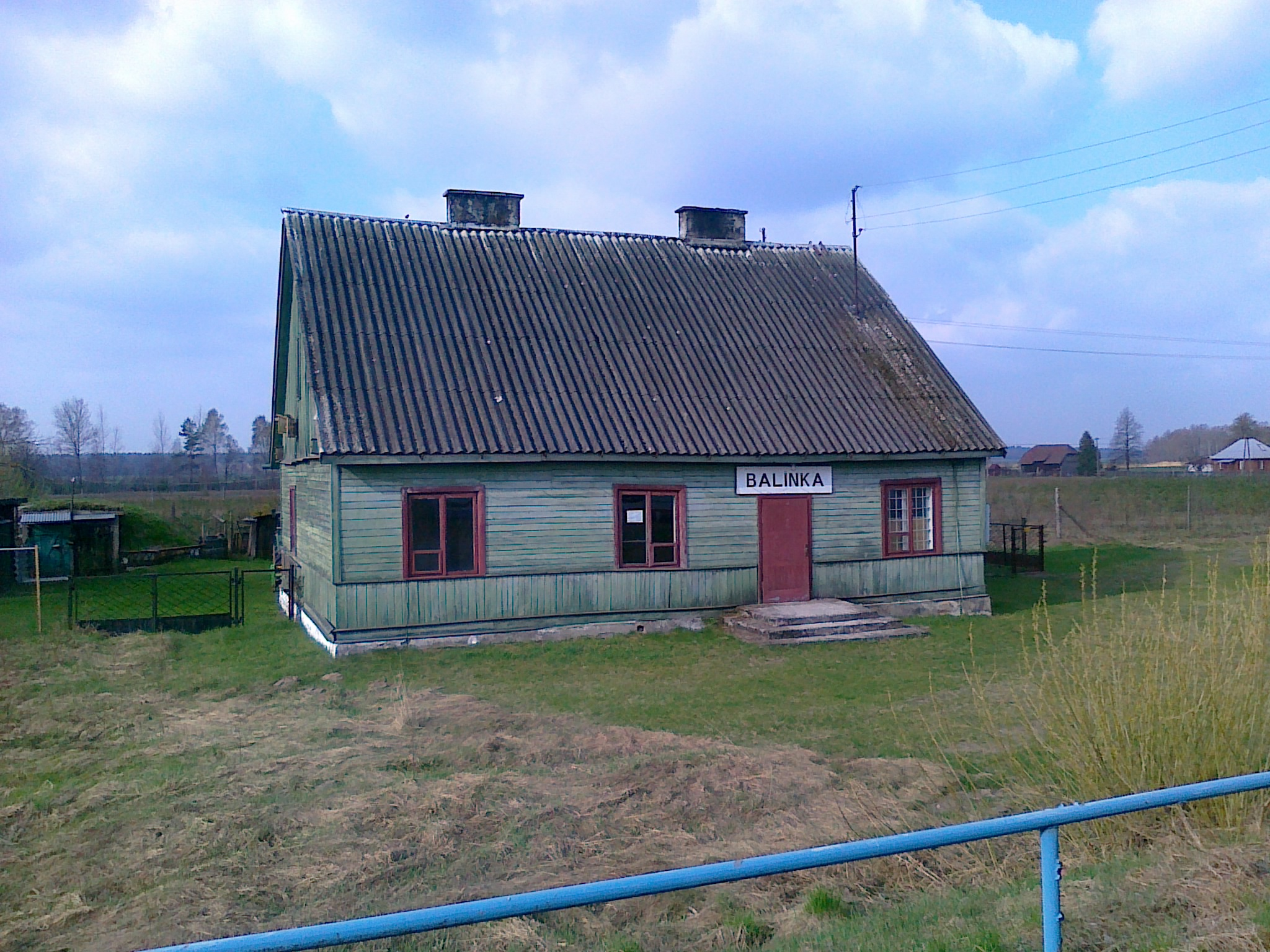

- Location within Poland
- Coordinates: 53°47′N 23°10′E
- Country: Poland
- Voivodeship: Podlaskie
- County: Augustów
- Gmina: Sztabin
- Population: 120

Balinka [baˈliŋka] is a village in the administrative district of Gmina Sztabin, within Augustów County, Podlaskie Voivodeship, in north-eastern Poland.
