= Rygol, Augustów County =

Rygol
- Village
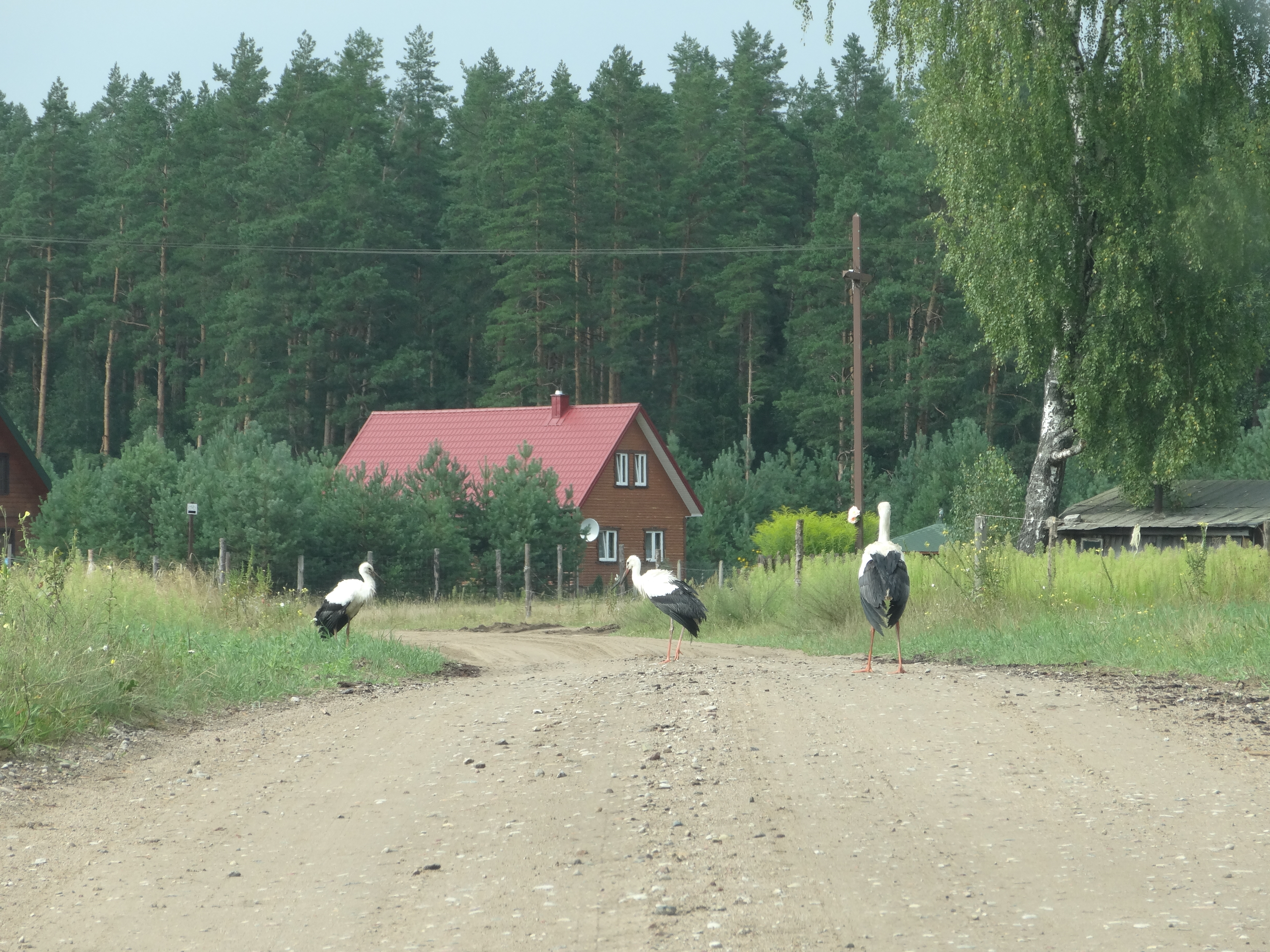

- Location within Poland
- Coordinates: 53°53′39″N 23°25′2″E
- Country: Poland
- Voivodeship: Podlaskie
- County: Augustów
- Gmina: Płaska
- Population: 150

Rygol [ˈrɨɡɔl] is a village in the administrative district of Gmina Płaska, within Augustów County, Podlaskie Voivodeship, in north-eastern Poland, close to the border with Belarus.
