= Dębowo, Augustów County =

Dębowo
- Village
- Location within Poland
- Coordinates: 53°36′47″N 22°56′17″E
- Country: Poland
- Voivodeship: Podlaskie
- County: Augustów
- Gmina: Sztabin

Dębowo [dɛmˈbɔvɔ] is a village in the administrative district of Gmina Sztabin, within Augustów County, Podlaskie Voivodeship, in north-eastern Poland.

== Notable people ==
- Adrian Krzyżanowski, mathematician and translator of German literature (1788-1852)
