= Gmina Płaska =

Gmina Płaska Płaska Commune
- Gmina
- Flag Coat of arms

- Gmina Płaska within the Augustów County
- Coordinates (Płaska): 53°54′N 23°15′E
- Country: Poland
- Voivodeship: Podlaskie
- County: Augustów
- Seat: Płaska

Area
  - Total: 373.19 km^{2} (144.09 sq mi)

Population (2019-06-30)
  - Total: 2,594
  - Density: 6.951/km^{2} (18.00/sq mi)
- Website: http://www.plaska.pl

Gmina Płaska is a rural gmina (administrative district) in Augustów County, Podlaskie Voivodeship, in north-eastern Poland, on the border with Belarus. Its seat is the village of Płaska, which lies approximately 20 kilometres (12 mi) east of Augustów and 88 km (55 mi) north of the regional capital Białystok.

The gmina covers an area of 373.19 square kilometres (144.1 sq mi), and as of 2019 its total population is 2,594.

== Villages ==
Gmina Płaska contains the villages and settlements of Dalny Las, Gorczyca, Gruszki, Hanus, Jałowy Róg, Jazy, Kielmin, Kopanica, Księży Mostek, Kudrynki, Lipiny, Lubinowo, Macharce, Mały Borek, Mikaszówka, Mołowiste, Muły, Osienniki, Ostryńskie, Perkuć, Płaska, Podmacharce, Przewięź, Rubcowo, Rudawka, Rygol, Serski Las, Serwy, Strzelcowizna, Sucha Rzeczka, Tartak and Trzy Kopce.

== Neighbouring gminas ==
Gmina Płaska is bordered by the town of Augustów and by the gminas of Augustów, Giby, Lipsk, Nowinka and Sztabin. It also borders Belarus (Grodno District).
