= Rogowo, Augustów County =

Rogowo
- Village
- Location within Poland
- Coordinates: 53°42′26″N 22°59′54″E
- Country: Poland
- Voivodeship: Podlaskie
- County: Augustów
- Gmina: Sztabin

Rogowo [rɔˈɡɔvɔ] is a village in the administrative district of Gmina Sztabin, within Augustów County, Podlaskie Voivodeship, in north-eastern Poland.
