= Ostrowie, Augustów County =

Ostrowie
- Village
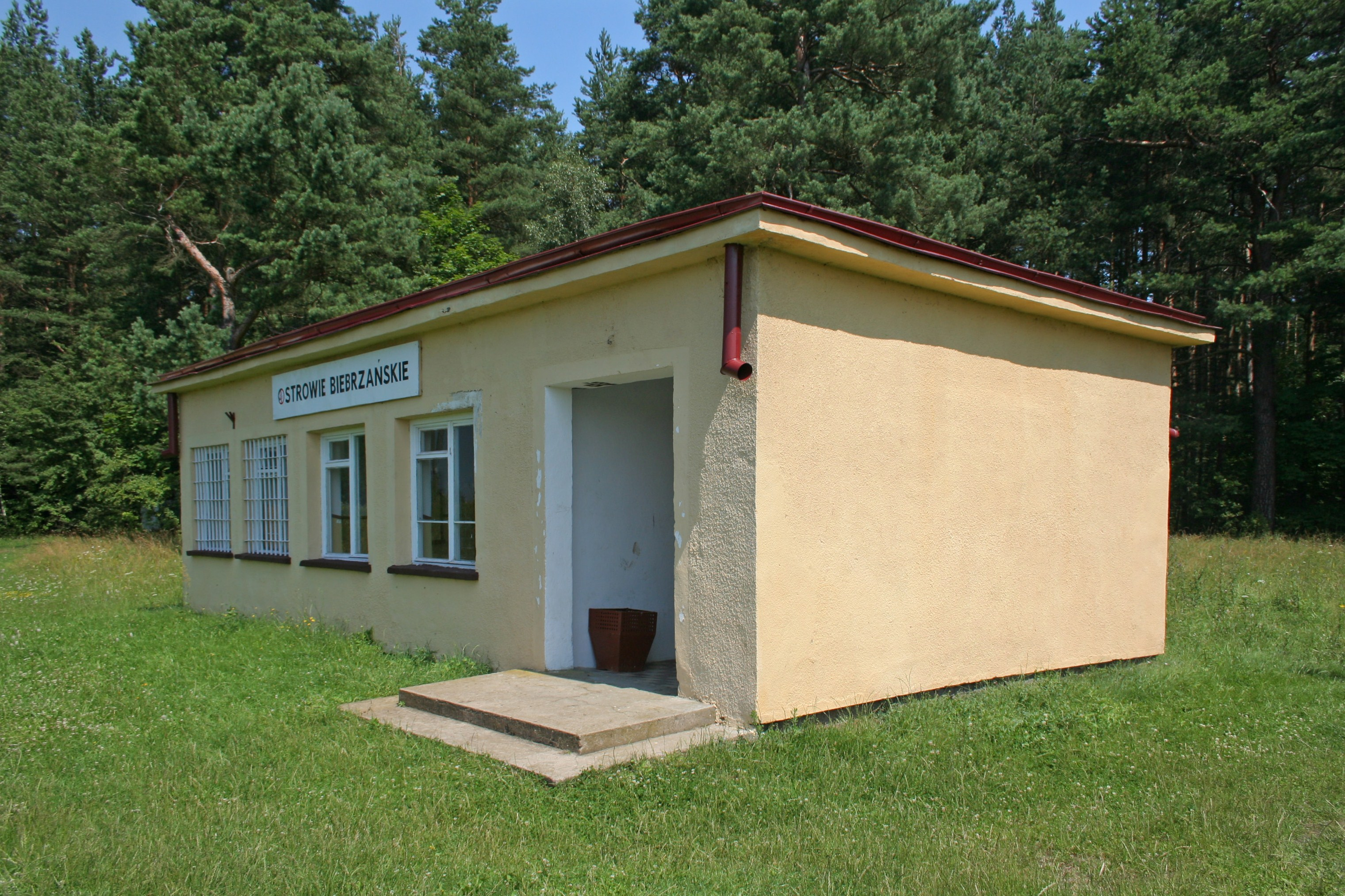

- Location within Poland
- Coordinates: 53°43′13″N 23°16′9″E
- Country: Poland
- Voivodeship: Podlaskie
- County: Augustów
- Gmina: Sztabin

Ostrowie [ɔsˈtrɔvjɛ] is a village in the administrative district of Gmina Sztabin, within Augustów County, Podlaskie Voivodeship, in north-eastern Poland.
