= Kopytkowo, Podlaskie Voivodeship =

Kopytkowo
- Village
- Location within Poland
- Coordinates: 53°35′21″N 22°53′44″E
- Country: Poland
- Voivodeship: Podlaskie
- County: Augustów
- Gmina: Sztabin

Kopytkowo [kɔpɨtˈkɔvɔ] is a village in the administrative district of Gmina Sztabin, within Augustów County, Podlaskie Voivodeship, in north-eastern Poland.
