= Hanus, Poland =

Hanus
- Settlement
- Location within Poland
- Coordinates: 53°49′27″N 23°20′27″E
- Country: Poland
- Voivodeship: Podlaskie
- County: Augustów
- Gmina: Płaska
- Population: 20

Hanus [ˈxanus] is a settlement in the administrative district of Gmina Płaska, within Augustów County, Podlaskie Voivodeship, in north-eastern Poland, close to the border with Belarus.
