= Balinka, Hungary =

Balinka
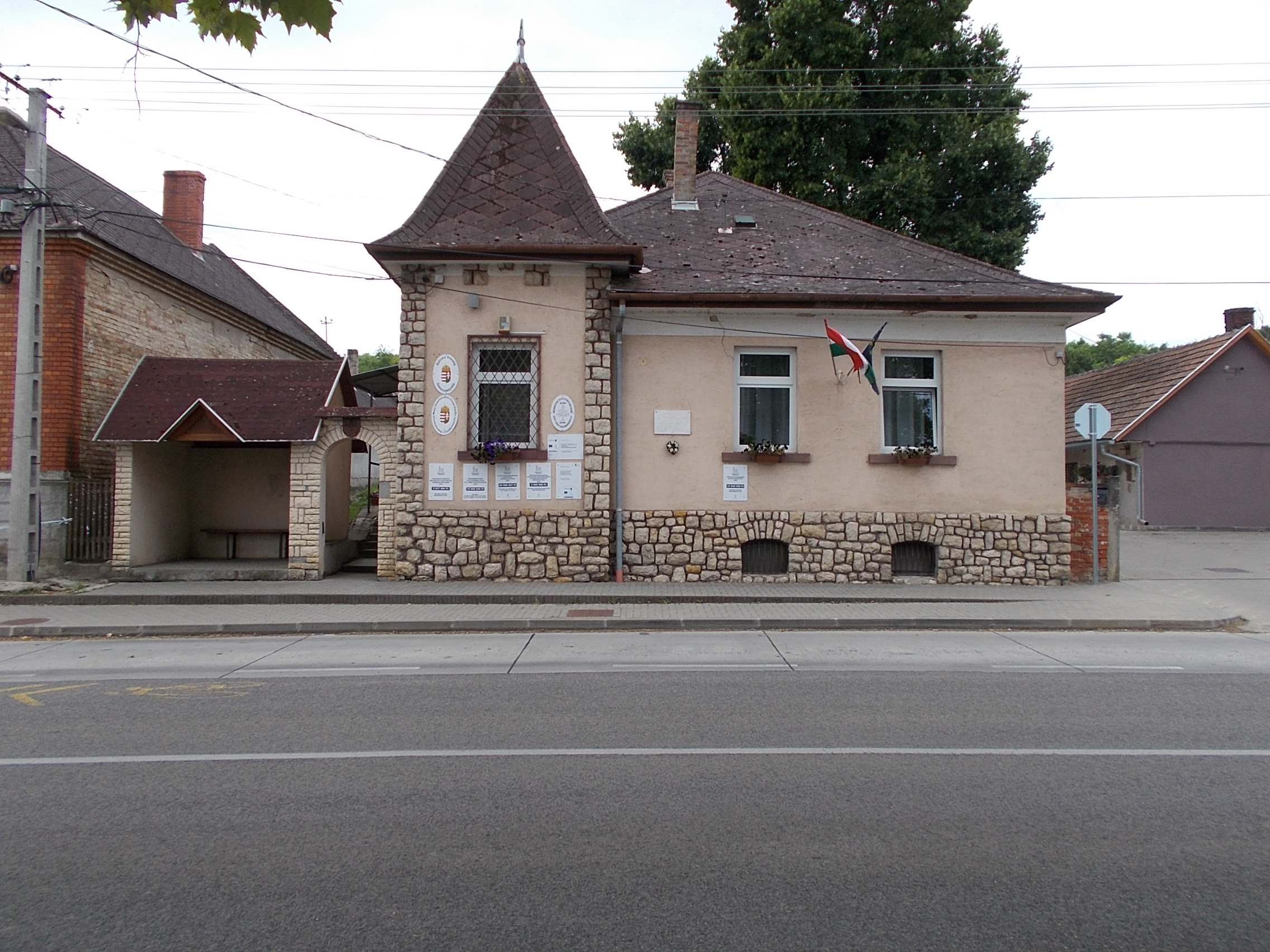
- Village hall

- Flag Coat of arms

- Location of Balinka in Hungary
- Coordinates: 47.313°N 18.192°E
- Country: Hungary
- Region: Central Transdanubia
- County: Fejér

Area
  - Total: 18.62 km^{2} (7.19 sq mi)

Population (2017)
  - Total: 889
  - Density: 47.7/km^{2} (124/sq mi)
- Time zone: UTC+1 (CET)
  - Summer (DST): UTC+2 (CEST)
- Postal code: 8055
- Area code: +36 22
- Website: http://balinka.hu/

Balinka is a village in Fejér county, Hungary.
