= Rospuda =

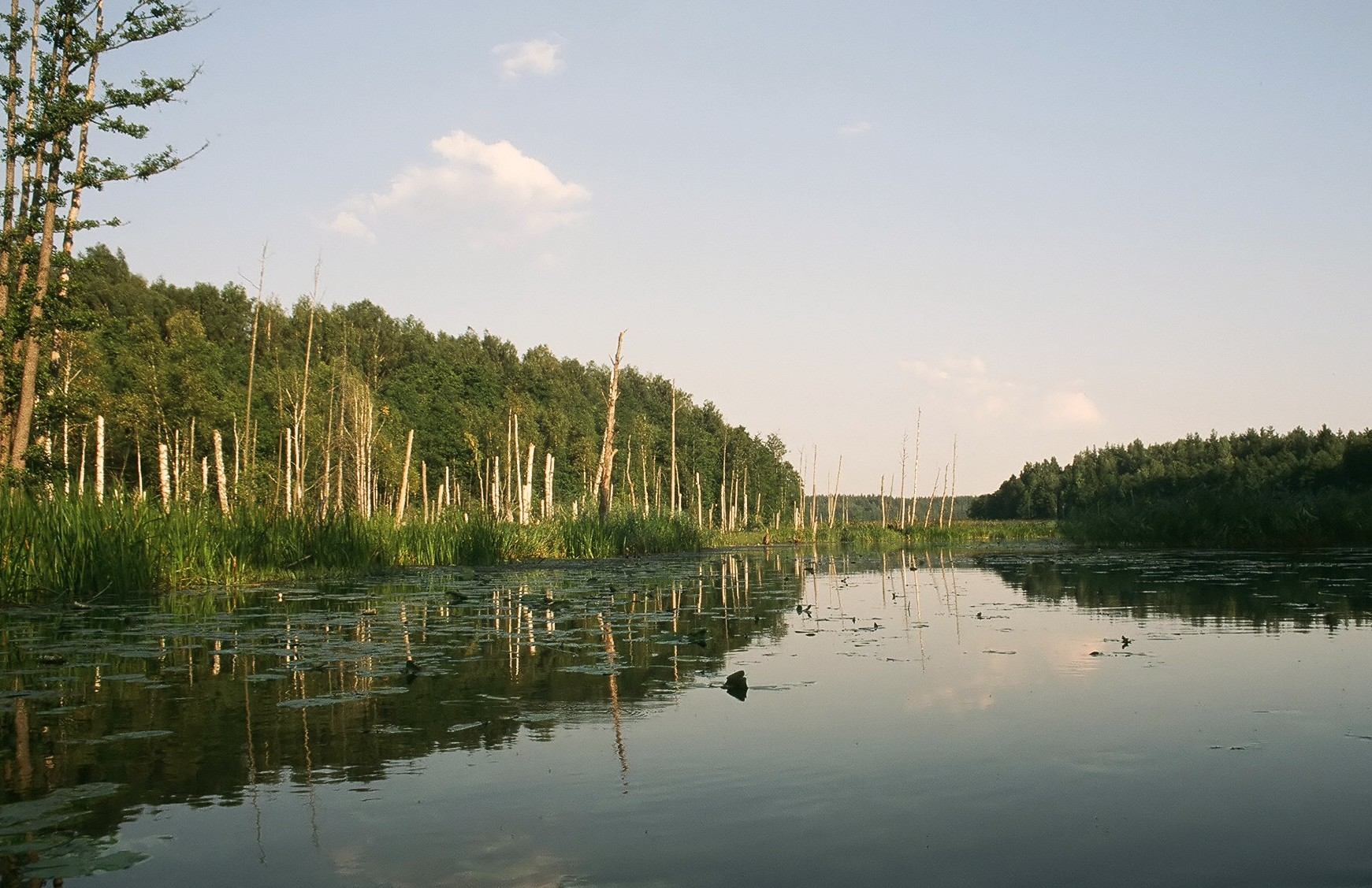
- Rospuda between the Sumowo and Okrągłe lakes, nearby Kotowina village

Location
- Country: Poland

Physical characteristics
- Source
  - location: Czarne Lake
  - elevation: 175 m (574 ft)
- Mouth
  - location: Rospuda Augustowska Lake
  - coordinates: 53.9076°N 22.9110°E
- Length: approx. 80 km (50 mi)
- Basin size: approx. 900 km^{2} (350 sq mi)
- Discharge
  - average: 2.57 m^{3}/s (91 cu ft/s) (at Raczki)

Basin features
- Progression: Netta→ Biebrza→ Narew→ Vistula→ Baltic Sea

The Rospuda (Polish pronunciation: [rɔsˈpuda]) is a small river in north-eastern Poland. It flows through the Suwałki Region of Poland, including the north-western part of the large Augustów Primeval Forest wilderness area. Its continuation, the Netta, is a tributary of the Biebrza. Around 2006 the river was threatened by planned construction of the Augustów bypass expressway, which was to cut across the protected wilderness area in the valley. After an intense campaign of protests in Poland and abroad and also counter-protests of the local community, the plans have been changed, and now the highway has been rerouted to completely avoid the wilderness area.

== Geography ==
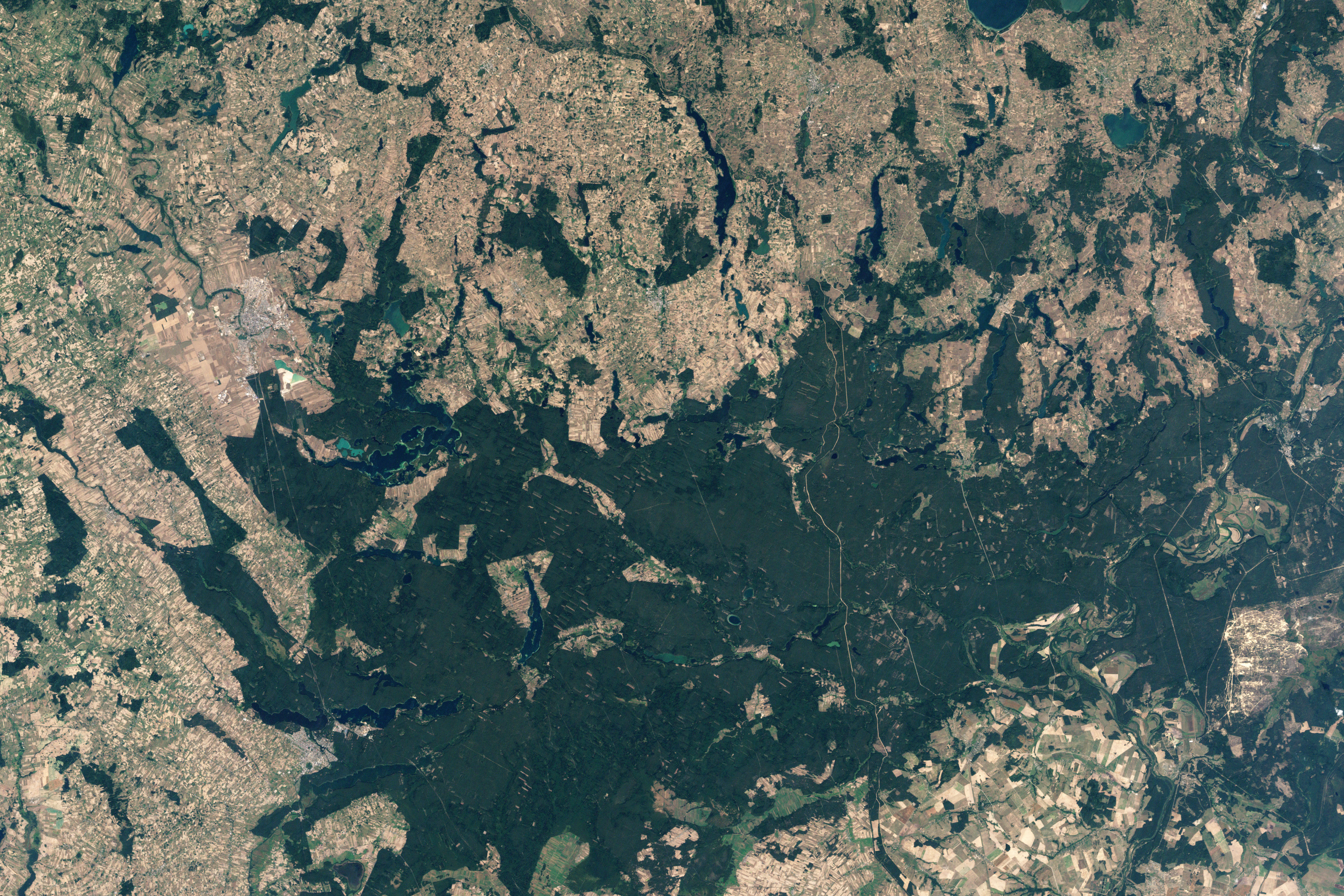
The Rospuda Valley as seen from space.

Its usually quoted source is a combination of several streams, which rise on slopes of hills (Przejmowa Góra – 213.4m, Jastrzębia Góra – 230.8m, Słupowa Góra – 247.9 m, Lisia Góra – 259.5 m) southward of an old forest, Puszcza Romincka located southeast of Gołdap. The river proper rises from a lake called Jezioro Czarne and flows in a south and south-eastern direction through a series of nine postglacial lakes: Rospuda Filipowska, Kamienne, Długie, Garbas, Głębokie, Sumowo, Okrągłe, Bolesty, and The Rospuda Augustowska into which it finally empties. The Rospuda flows through typical young glacial landforms: postglacial channel lakes, eskers (long, narrow, winding ridges composed of stratified sand and gravel), and flat outwash plains. This landscape results from Scandinavian ice sheet activity during the Baltic glaciation: the postglacial channel in which the Rospuda flows was dug by a stream flowing underneath the ice sheet; eskers were composed of material accumulated by flowing water, and the outwash is a vast alluvial cone of sand and gravel deposited by a subglacial meltwater stream. In the upper reaches of the river, in the stretches between lakes, the Rospuda has a narrow winding channel of a rocky bed with rapids, for which it slightly resembles a mountain stream. The Rospuda flows through forests and meadows, within a narrow steep-sided valley with numerous bends, gorges, and felled trees. Narrow postglacial channel lakes flow for miles: Rospuda Filipowska and Bolesty, the longest two, are 3.6 mi (5.8 km) long and only 0.25–0.5 mi (0.40–0.80 km) wide. Their banks are high and forested or covered in meadows and cut across with ravines. These interesting landforms are attributable to erosion, the outcome of flowing rainwaters. In the lower reaches of the river, where it enters Augustów Primeval Forest, the Rospuda changes into a typically lowland river. It meanders through reeds within a boggy riparian valley, passing Święte Miejsce and Młyńsko, sacred sites in the region. The channel of the river gets wider forming a basin of peat bog, i.e. the Rospuda Valley (Pol. Dolina Rospudy).

The Rospuda is a 41.5 mi (66.8 km) long canoe trail, rarely frequented, a picturesque one, though troublesome at times. Sudden bends, rocky shallows, rocks and stilts driven in the bed of the river, or felled trees require attention, reflex, and experience in dealing with such obstacles. In the lower reaches of the river, on the other hand, monotonous landscape can prove tiresome since the Rospuda winds through reeds blocking out the views. Still, there are convenient spots to set up camp along the whole trail.

=== Tributaries ===
- Blizna

=== Towns along the Rospuda banks ===
- Filipów
- Bakałarzewo
- Raczki
- Augustów

== Historical Curiosities ==
The Rospuda River used to be called by different names depending on its segment. The name Dowspuda is mentioned by the Erection Act of The Raczki Church from 1599. Other names included Rowspuda, Filipówka (near the village Filipów) and Kamienna.

According to Professor Knut Olaf Falk, the name Dowspuda was rooted in the word Dau-spūda, which, in the extinct western Baltic language - Yotvingian, meant "to push" or "heavy pressure" and stems from the fact that, in the springtime, the river raises its level by about one meter, which results in pumping water back up its tributaries and changing its flow. This phenomenon may be observed on the Jałówka River joining the Rospuda River with Jałowo Lake or on the Klonownica River joining the Rospuda Augustowska Lake and Necko Lake with Białe Lake.

The terrains the Rospuda River bypasses used to be the part of the lands known as Jaćwież. The sacred cult site known as Uroczysko Święte Miejsce harks back to the pagan traditions. From the fifteenth century until the twentieth century the Rospuda River constituted the border between Lithuania and Prussian lands.

Picturesque ruins of the neo-Gothic Pac Palace still stand on the high river banks in Dowspuda village, located to the south of Raczki. In 1824, Ludwik Michał Pac, the owner of the palace, ordered twelve stone stairs built on the three-kilometer-long segment of the river between Raczki, Dowspuda and below to beautify the area with waterfalls. However, the dams as well as the palace, were later dismantled. Stone shallows are the only remnants. In July 1972, one of the scenes from TV serial Czarne Chmury was shot on the edge of the glade with the view on the river valley in the downstream of the Rospuda River near Szczebra village.

== Environmental Characteristics of Rospuda Valley ==
The Rospuda Valley is one of the most valuable wetland areas (blanket, raised, and temporary bogs) with natural, intact water relations. That is, the bog maintains a steady water level, and therefore does not cover with trees and shrubs. Therefore, it differs from wetlands influenced by human, e.g., Biebrza Bogs, which must be mowed to stop succession of reedbeds, scrubs, and forest.

Rospuda Valley is under protection because of its rare animals and plants. For example, there are 19 kinds of Orchidaceae (all of which are under strict protection), including musk orchid (Herminium monorchis), and white variety of early marsh-orchid (Dactylorhiza majalis). The former has been recorded in the Polish Red Data Book of Plants, and Rospuda Valley is its only Polish locality. The latter exists in a few more places in Poland.

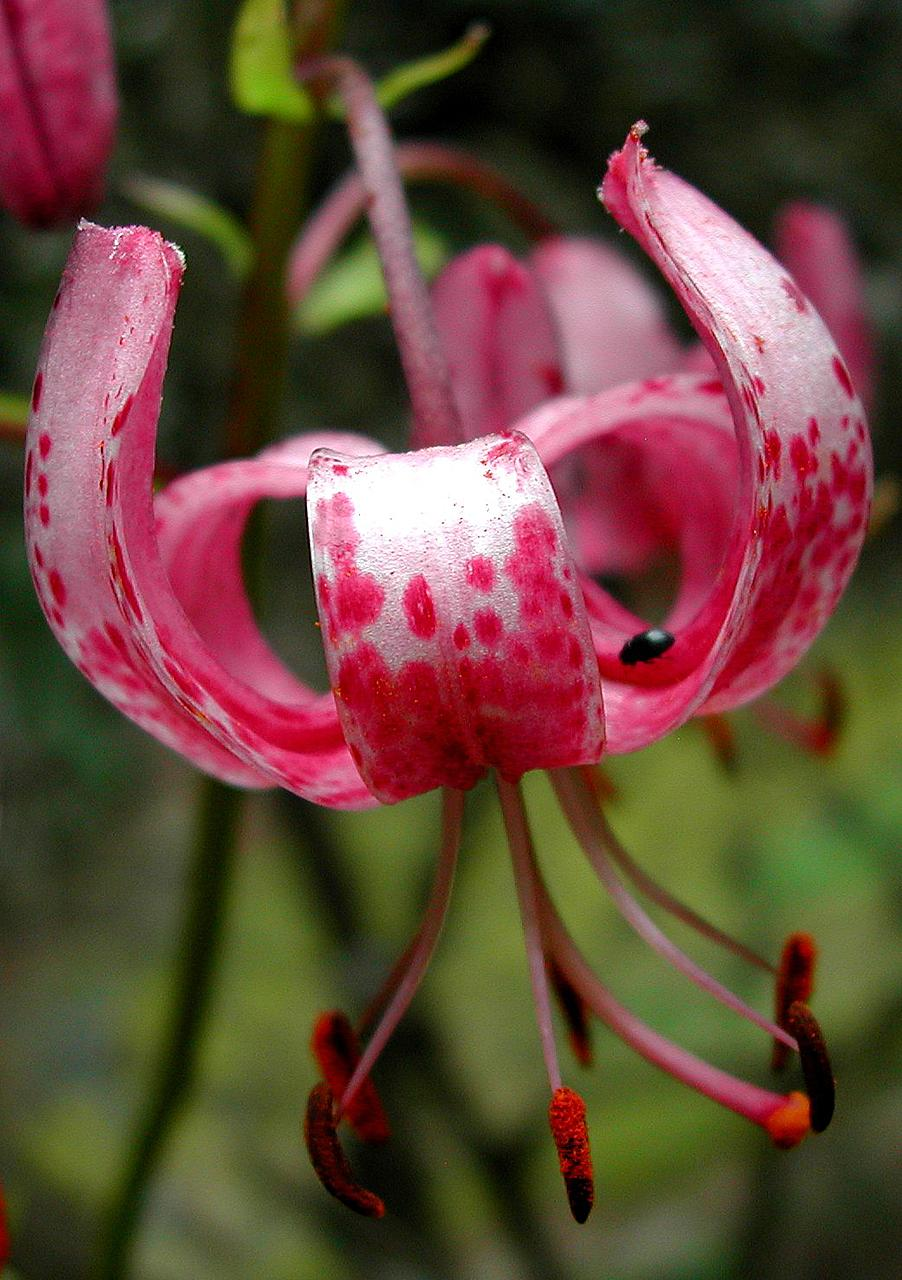
Turk's cap lily

Other orchids that are to be found in Rospuda Valley include: the western marsh orchid (Dactylorhiza majalis), lady's slipper orchid (Cypripedium calceolus), early coralroot (Corallorrhiza trifida), the common spotted orchid (Dactylorhiza fuchsii), Pugsley's marsh orchid (Dactylorhiza traunsteineri), marsh helleborine (Epipactis palustris), fen orchid (Liparis loeselii). In Rospuda Valley there are also other rare and protected plants including: dwarf birch (Betula humilis), Greek valerian (Polemonium caeruleum), English sundew (Drosera anglica), round-leaved sundew (Drosera rotundifolia), Turk's cap lily (Lilium martagon) etc.

The Rospuda Valley and its adjacent forests are inhabited by the following protected birds: hazel grouse (Bonasa bonasia), the capercaillie (Tetrao urogallus), spotted crake (Porzana porzana), the corn crake (Crex crex), the common crane (Grus grus), the white-tailed eagle (Haliaeetus albicilla), lesser spotted eagle (Aquila pomarina), marsh harrier, the European honey buzzard (Pernis apivorus), the Tengmalm's owl (Aegolius funereus), the white stork (Ciconia ciconia), the black woodpecker, the white-backed woodpecker (Dendrocopos leucotos), the red-backed shrike (Lanius collurio), the barred warbler (Sylvia nisoria) and other. The area serves as a haunt for birds nesting nearby, e.g. in Augustów Primeval Forest.

For big mammals, like wolves or deer, the Rospuda Valley serves as a migratory corridor, through which they move west from Augustów Primeval Forest and Biebrza National Park. Moreover, the Valley is also inhabited by beavers, otters, foxes and other animals.

== Nature Protection ==
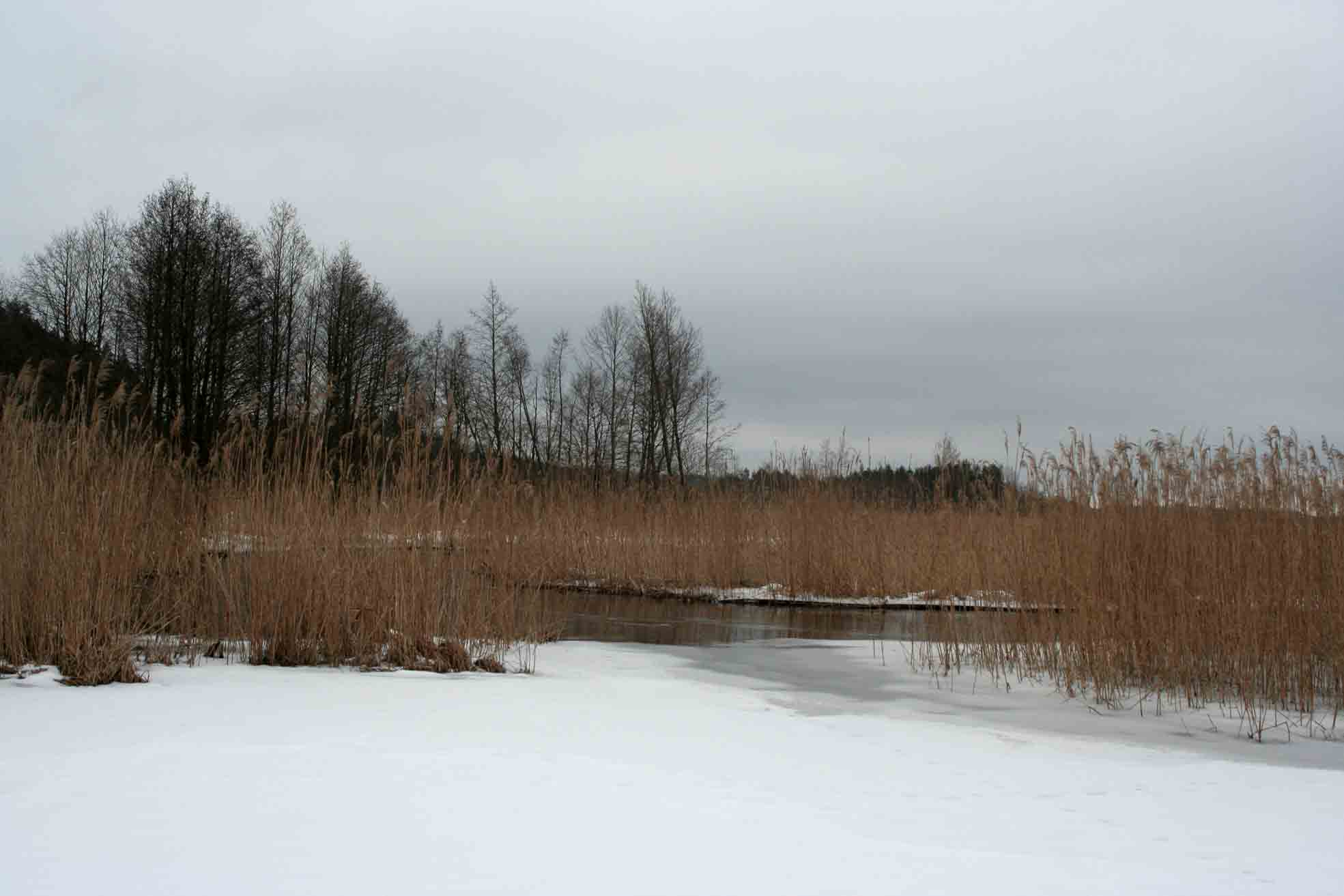
Rospuda in winter

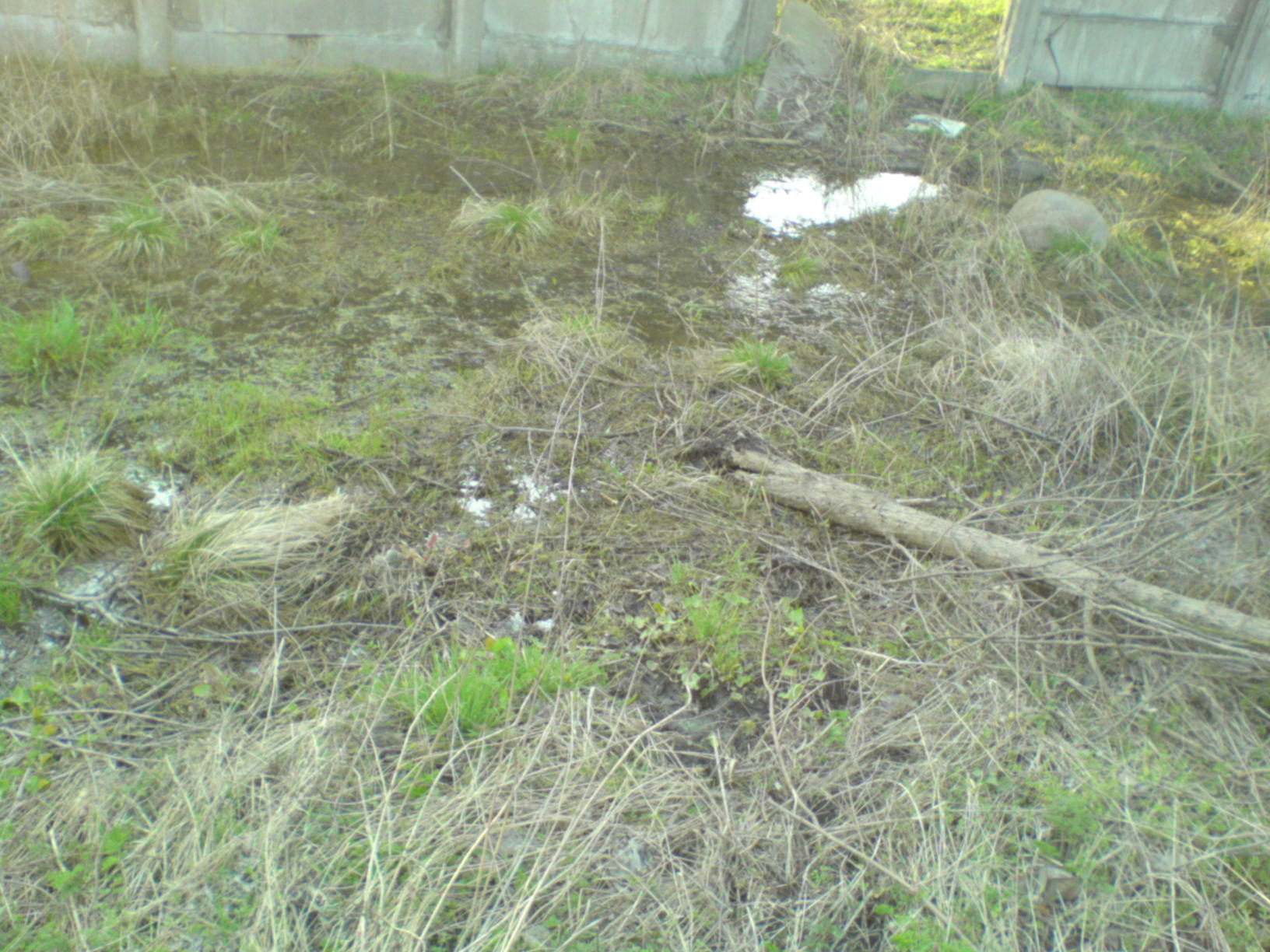
Bogs in the Rospuda Valley area

Rospuda Valley constitutes:

- An area of protected landscape (since 1989)
- A quiet zone
- Part of the European Ecological Networks Nature 2000 designated under the Directive on the Conservation of Wild Birds as a Special Bird Protection Area
- Part of Augustów Primeval Forest Sanctuary (since 2004)
- The top position on the Shadow List of areas that according to scientists and ecological organizations should be designated as a Special Areas of Conservation under the Council Directive on the conservation of natural habitats and of wild flora and fauna
- A junction of internationally recognized significance in National Ecological Networks (Polish: Zielone Płuca Polski) due to its geomorphologic, hydrological and biotic characteristics, as well as the structure of the landscape, the already protected areas and those that shall be protected

A nature reserve will be created at Rospuda Valley. It will protect the musk orchid, the woodgrouse, sea eagle, and lesser spotted eagle, which nest in the area. The reserve will be a part of Augustów-Druskienniki Protected Area, which is being created with the cooperation of Poland, Lithuania, and Belarus.

== Threats ==
Green Ribbon - a symbol for the campaign against the construction of the Augustów ring road

A green ribbon is used as a symbol for the campaign against the construction of the Augustów ring road.

Ecological activists as well as scientists such as botanists, zoologists, ecology experts, hydrologists experts on peat bog plant cover and the European Commission are of the opinion that the Rospuda Valley is endangered by the plans of construction of the Augustów ringroad.

If the project is realized, the wildlife will be damaged not only by the expressway itself, but also by the construction process. The noise and pollution inherent in construction work would harm the breeding grounds of various bird species, some of which are protected, as well as some endangered plant species Furthermore, construction of the overpass may disturb the fragile water systems in the valley.

Because the documentation of the project does not state the influence of the enterprise on the water systems and considering the inadequate plans for compensation of nature devastation, the European Commission asserts that the enterprise would hinder the avifauna, which is to be protected within the framework of Nature 2000.

Quite a different opinion on the matter is held by the General Directorate for National Roads and Motorways (GDDKiA). They claim that the way the overpass is going to be built, as well as the devices designed to discharge the water from the road to the outside of the valley will effectively minimize the damage.

The National Environment Protection Council (an advisory body of the Ministry of the Environment) speaks reprovingly of the project, indicating impossibility of any compensation for the project and erroneousness of the peat bog type evaluation as well as of the mode of supplying it with water.

== The Via Baltica controversy of 2006–2009 ==
In December 2006 the European Commission opened legal infringement procedures against the Polish government for consenting to the road developments, which would severely damage important and protected natural sites. In February 2007 the governor of the local province signed the go-ahead for the construction works to start, claiming that all legal requirements had been met, despite the fact that the region is protected by the EU Natura 2000 program and Poland can be severely fined by the EU for constructing the highway. On 13 February 2007 the Polish Ombudsman launched an appeal against the decision, with the aim of halting construction works. The appeal was based on suspicion that alternative routings of the bypass were not taken into consideration. An independent road designer's variant omits the Rospuda valley and was estimated to cost €17 million less than the currently planned environmentally damaging variant. There have been strong protests by activists and politicians both in Poland and abroad. However, the construction has not been called off. In February 2007 a number of environmental activists pitched a camp in the endangered region to prevent the construction work. The Polish daily Gazeta Wyborcza has launched an on-line petition signed by over 140,000 people asking the Polish President Lech Kaczyński to respect the law, preserve the Rospuda Valley and direct the Augustów bypass via a different route. On February 22, 2007 the construction of the Augustów bypass expressway began with the taking of geodetic measurements. There was unofficial information that earthworks are, for now, being begun only from the Augustów side, away from the protected area, and where both road variants overlap. On February 27, 2007 scaring birds away from the Rospuda valley started with permission issued by the Chief Nature Conservator, suggesting that heavy construction works in the valley will soon begin, as the public Polish Television (TVP) reported.

In 2009 the Polish authorities announced that the plan to build the highway through Rospuda valley has been abandoned, and a new alternative route that avoids the valley has been selected.

In 2010 Malgorzata Gorska, one of the leaders of the campaign to protect the Rospuda Valley won the Goldman Environmental Prize.
