= Gmina Sztabin =

Gmina Sztabin Sztabin Commune
- Gmina
- Coat of arms

- Gmina Sztabin within the Augustów County
- Coordinates (Sztabin): 53°41′N 23°7′E
- Country: Poland
- Voivodeship: Podlaskie
- County: Augustów
- Seat: Sztabin

Area
  - Total: 361.8 km^{2} (139.7 sq mi)

Population (2019-06-30)
  - Total: 5,079
  - Density: 14.04/km^{2} (36.36/sq mi)
- Website: http://www.sztabin.ug.gov.pl

Gmina Sztabin is a rural gmina (administrative district) in Augustów County, Podlaskie Voivodeship, in north-eastern Poland. Its seat is the village of Sztabin, which lies approximately 21 kilometres (13 mi) south-east of Augustów and 63 km (39 mi) north of the regional capital Białystok.

The gmina covers an area of 361.8 square kilometres (139.7 sq mi), and as of 2019 its total population is 5,079.

== Villages ==
Gmina Sztabin contains the villages and settlements of Andrzejewo, Balinka, Brzozowe Grądy, Budziski, Chomaszewo, Cisów, Czarniewo, Czarny Las, Dębowo, Długie, Ewy, Fiedorowizna, Grzędy, Hruskie, Huta, Jagłowo, Jaminy, Janówek, Jasionowo Dębowskie, Jastrzębna Druga, Jastrzębna Pierwsza, Jaziewo, Kamień, Karoliny, Klonowo, Kolonie Jasionowo, Komaszówka, Kopiec, Kopytkowo, Krasnoborki, Krasnybór, Kryłatka, Kunicha, Lebiedzin, Lipowo, Łubianka, Mogilnice, Motułka, Ostrowie, Podcisówek, Polkowo, Rogowo, Ściokła, Sosnowo, Sztabin, Wilcze Bagno, Wilkownia, Wolne, Wrotki and Żmojdak.

== Neighbouring gminas ==
Gmina Sztabin is bordered by the gminas of Augustów, Bargłów Kościelny, Dąbrowa Białostocka, Goniądz, Jaświły, Lipsk, Płaska and Suchowola.
