= Sztabin =

- Village
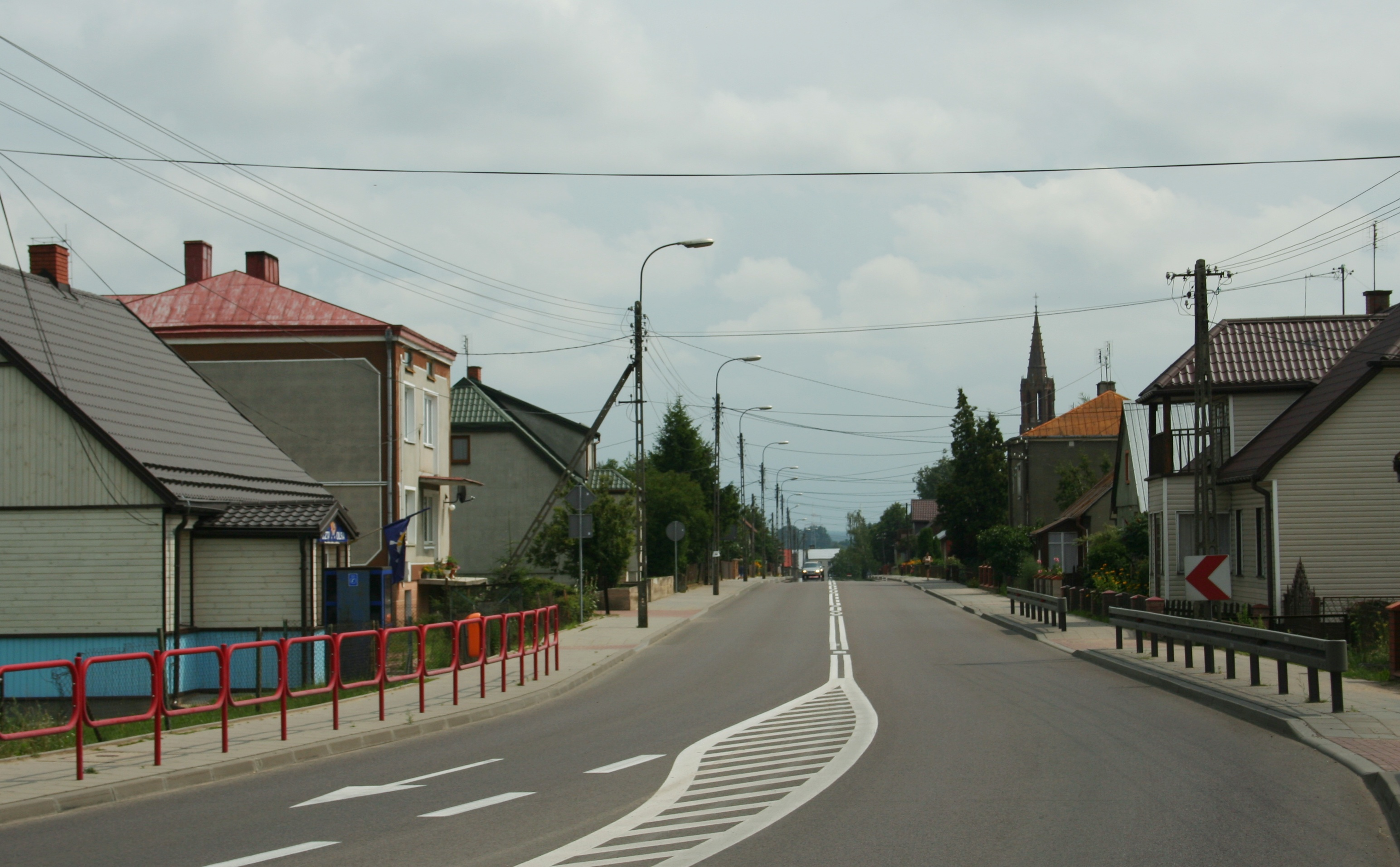
- View of the town, July 2009

- Location within Poland
- Coordinates: 53°41′N 23°7′E
- Country: Poland
- Voivodeship: Podlaskie
- County: Augustów
- Gmina: Sztabin

Population
  - Total: 920
- Time zone: UTC+1 (CET)
  - Summer (DST): UTC+2 (CEST)
- Vehicle registration: BAU

Sztabin ([ˈʂtabʲin]; Lithuanian: Štabinas) is a village in Augustów County, Podlaskie Voivodeship, in north-eastern Poland. It is the seat of the gmina (administrative district) called Gmina Sztabin.

== History ==
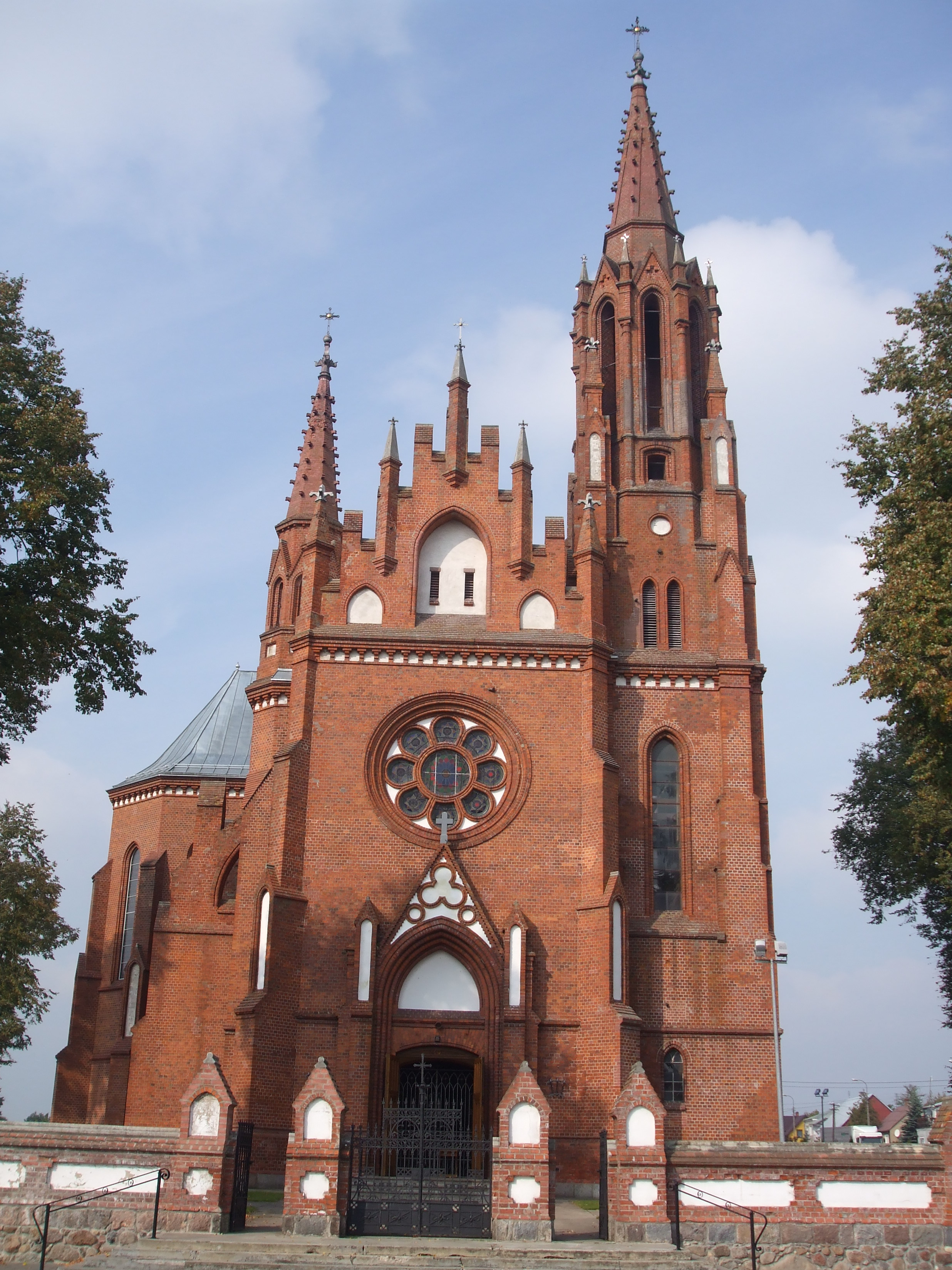
Saint James church

The territories of the present Sztabin Commune were once inhabited by the Yotvingians. In 1506, King Alexander Jagiellon gave a part of this land to the Chreptowicz family.

The village was founded by Adam Chreptowicz before 1598, at the river crossing, on the route from Augustów to Knyszyn. At the beginning of its existence, it was called Osinki for over a century and a half.

In 1627, a Uniate church was founded by Adam Chreptowicz, which stood in the place of a previous Orthodox chapel founded in 1513 by Teodor Chreptowicz. Around 1656, the church was converted into a Roman Catholic church.

The name Sztabin was introduced in 1760 by Joachim Chreptowicz, Chancellor of the Grand Duchy of Lithuania. He marked out a triangular market and a network of streets. The settlement became the main market town of Krasnoborski estates (Chreptowicz, and later Brzostowski). At the end of the 17th century, it began to transform into an urban center. In 1766 Sztabin obtained the royal privilege to organize fairs.

The town is known mainly for the social and economic experiments of Count Karol Brzostowski. In the 1820s he founded the so-called Republic of Sztabin. He freed the peasants from serfdom, set up a school and introduced compulsory free education in his estates, modernized agriculture (introduced crop rotation and new tools), built a hospital to which he brought a doctor, introduced a penal code, founded a savings and loans fund. He built a glassworks, a brickyard, a sawmill, and a cast iron factory (with a turf ore remelting furnace), bringing the declining estate to flourish. Thanks to him, a parish was established in 1895, and a marina at Biebrza was built.

After his death (1854), he gave his property to peasants in perpetual lease, but the Russian authorities annulled his will. Sztabin slowly lost its importance and in 1897 it was deprived of town rights.

Sztabin's population took an active part in the struggle for national liberation. During the January Uprising, a company of colonel Konstanty Ramotowski "Wawr" operated in the area, whose camp at the Goat Market in the Augustów Forest was the site of one of the major battles in this region.

According to the 1921 Polish Census, Sztabin was inhabited by 500 people, among whom 437 were Roman Catholic, 62 Jewish, and one Orthodox. At the same time, all residents declared Polish nationality. There were 83 residential buildings in the village.

Following the German-Soviet invasion of Poland, which started World War II in September 1939, the village was initially occupied by the Soviet Union until 1941, and then by Germany until 1944. Afterwards, it was restored to Poland, although with a Soviet-installed communist regime, which stayed in power until the Fall of Communism in the 1980s. The Polish anti-communist resistance was active in Sztabin, and in 1945 it raided a local communist police station.

== Sources ==
- VLKK (2002). "Atvirkštinis lietuvių kalboje vartojamų tradicinių Lenkijos vietovardžių formų sąrašas" (PDF). VLKK (in Lithuanian).
