= Augustów County =

Augustów County Powiat augustowski
- County
- Flag Coat of arms

- Location within the voivodeship
- Coordinates (Augustów): 53°51′N 22°58′E
- Country: Poland
- Voivodeship: Podlaskie
- Seat: Augustów
- Gminas: Total 7 (incl. 1 urban): Augustów; Gmina Augustów; Gmina Bargłów Kościelny; Gmina Lipsk; Gmina Nowinka; Gmina Płaska; Gmina Sztabin

Area
  - Total: 1,658.27 km^{2} (640.26 sq mi)

Population (2019-06-30)
  - Total: 58,205
  - Density: 35.100/km^{2} (90.908/sq mi)
  - Urban: 32,516
  - Rural: 25,689
- Car plates: BAU
- Website: www.augustowski.home.pl

Augustów County (Polish: powiat augustowski) is a unit of territorial administration and local government (powiat) in Podlaskie Voivodeship, north-eastern Poland, on the border with Belarus. It came into being on 1 January 1999 as a result of the Polish local government reforms passed in 1998. Its administrative seat and largest city is Augustów, which lies 83 kilometres (52 mi) north of the regional capital Białystok. The only other town in the county is Lipsk, lying 32 km (20 mi) south-east of Augustów.

The county covers an area of 1,658.27 square kilometres (640.3 sq mi). As of 2019 its total population is 58,205.

== Neighbouring counties ==
Augustów County is bordered by Sokółka County to the south-east, Mońki County to the south, Grajewo County and Ełk County to the west, Suwałki County to the north, and Sejny County to the north-east. It also borders Belarus to the east.

== Administrative divisions ==
The county is subdivided into seven gminas (one urban, one urban-rural and five rural). These are listed in the following table, in descending order of population.

Gmina	Type	Area (km^{2})	Population (2019)	Seat
Augustów	urban	80.9	30,190	
Gmina Augustów	rural	266.5	6,764	Augustów*
Gmina Bargłów Kościelny	rural	187.6	5,545	Bargłów Kościelny
Gmina Lipsk	urban-rural	184.4	5,129	Lipsk
Gmina Sztabin	rural	361.8	5,079	Sztabin
Gmina Nowinka	rural	203.8	2,904	Nowinka
Gmina Płaska	rural	373.2	2,594	Płaska
* seat not part of the gmina
