= Radzivilki =

Village in Grodno Region, Belarus

Radzivilki Радзівілкі
- Village
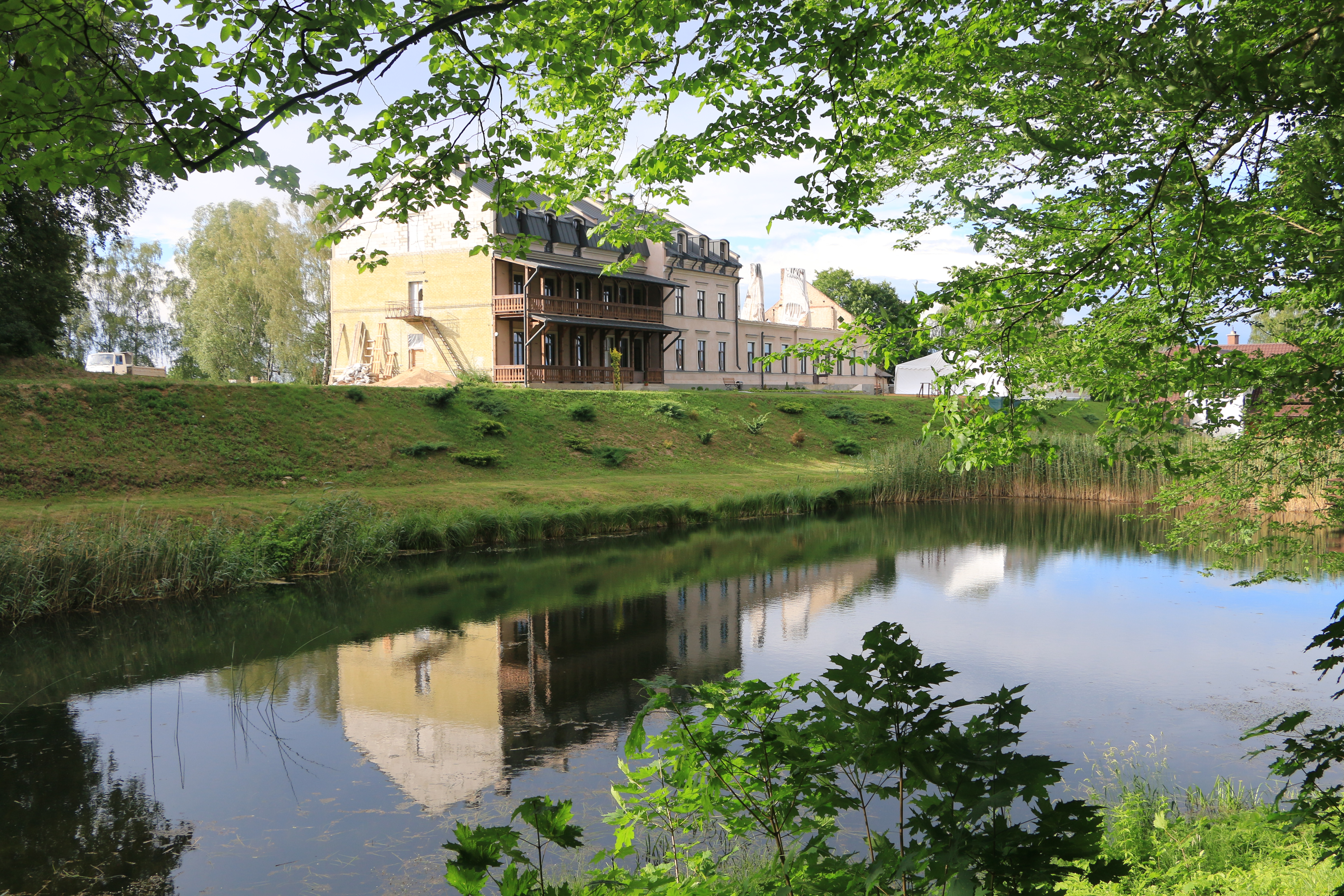

- Location within Belarus
- Coordinates: 53°50′59″N 23°41′48″E
- Country: Belarus
- Region: Grodno Region
- District: Grodno District
- Time zone: UTC+3 (MSK)

Radzivilki (Belarusian: Радзівілкі; Russian: Радзивилки; Polish: Radziwiłki) is a village in Grodno District, Grodno Region, in western Belarus.

== History ==
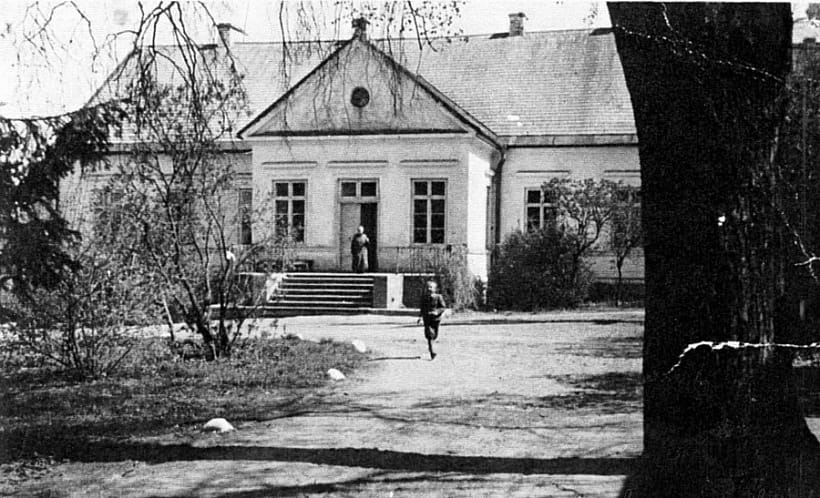
Radziwiłki in the interwar period

In the interwar period, Radziwiłki, as it was known in Polish, was administratively located in the Augustów County in the Białystok Voivodeship of Poland. According to the 1921 census, the population was entirely Polish by nationality and Catholic by confession.

Following the invasion of Poland in September 1939, Radziwiłki was first occupied by the Soviet Union until 1941, then by Nazi Germany until 1944, and then re-occupied by the Soviet Union, which eventually annexed it from Poland in 1945. A local Polish teacher was murdered by the Russians in the Katyn massacre in 1940.

== Demographics ==
Historical population
Year	Pop.	±%
1827	57	—
1921	216	+278.9%
