= Astasha =

Village in Grodno Region, Belarus

Astasha Асташа
- Village
- Location within Belarus
- Coordinates: 53°50′57″N 23°44′17″E
- Country: Belarus
- Region: Grodno Region
- District: Grodno District
- Time zone: UTC+3 (MSK)

Astasha (Belarusian: Асташа, Polish: Ostasza) is a village in Grodno District, Grodno Region, in western Belarus.

== History ==
In 1827, it had a population of 20.

In the interwar period, Ostasza, as it was known in Polish, was administratively located in the Augustów County in the Białystok Voivodeship of Poland. According to the 1921 census, the village with the adjacent manor farm had a population of 298, entirely Polish by nationality and 99.0% Catholic and 1.0% Jewish by confession.

Following the invasion of Poland in September 1939, the village was first occupied by the Soviet Union until 1941, then by Nazi Germany until 1944, and then re-occupied by the Soviet Union, which eventually annexed it from Poland in 1945. In February 1945, the Kedyw Polish resistance organization executed five NKVD agents in the village.
