= Balianienty =

Village in Grodno Region, Belarus

Balianienty Пясчаны
- Village
- Location within Belarus
- Coordinates: 53°50′53″N 23°40′17″E
- Country: Belarus
- Region: Grodno Region
- District: Grodno District
- Time zone: UTC+3 (MSK)

Balianienty (Belarusian: Пясчаны, Polish: Balenięta) is a village in Grodno District, Grodno Region, in western Belarus.

== History ==
In 1827, it had a population of 71.

In the interwar period, Balenięta, as it was known in Polish, was administratively located in the Augustów County in the Białystok Voivodeship of Poland. According to the 1921 census, the village had a population of 214, entirely Polish by nationality and 99.1% Catholic by confession.

Following the invasion of Poland in September 1939, the village was first occupied by the Soviet Union until 1941, then by Nazi Germany until 1944, and then re-occupied by the Soviet Union, which eventually annexed it from Poland in 1945.
