= Shabany =

Village in Grodno Region, Belarus

Shabany Шабаны
- Village
- Location within Belarus
- Coordinates: 53°55′44″N 23°48′08″E
- Country: Belarus
- Region: Grodno Region
- District: Grodno District
- Time zone: UTC+3 (MSK)

Shabany (Belarusian: Шабаны, Polish: Szabany) is a village in Grodno District, Grodno Region, in western Belarus. It is situated on the Neman River.

== History ==
In the interwar period, Szabany, as it was known in Polish, was administratively located in Grodno County, Białystok Voivodeship, Poland. According to the 1921 census, the village had a population of 119, 94.1% Polish and 5.9% Belarusian by nationality.

Following the invasion of Poland in September 1939, the village was first occupied by the Soviet Union until 1941, then by Nazi Germany until 1944, and then re-occupied by the Soviet Union, which eventually annexed it from Poland in 1945.
