= Konwent Polonia =

Polish student corporation

- Founded: 1828; 198 years ago Tartu University
- Type: Academic male fraternity
- Affiliation: Independent
- Status: Active
- Scope: Local
- Motto: "1>2" and "One for all and all for one!"
- Colors: Amaranth, Blue and White
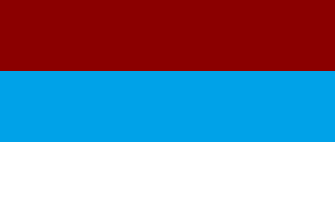
- Flag
- Chapters: 1
- Members: 1,600 lifetime
- Headquarters: Adama Mickiewicza 20; Sopot 81-832; Poland
- Website: www.konwentpolonia.pl

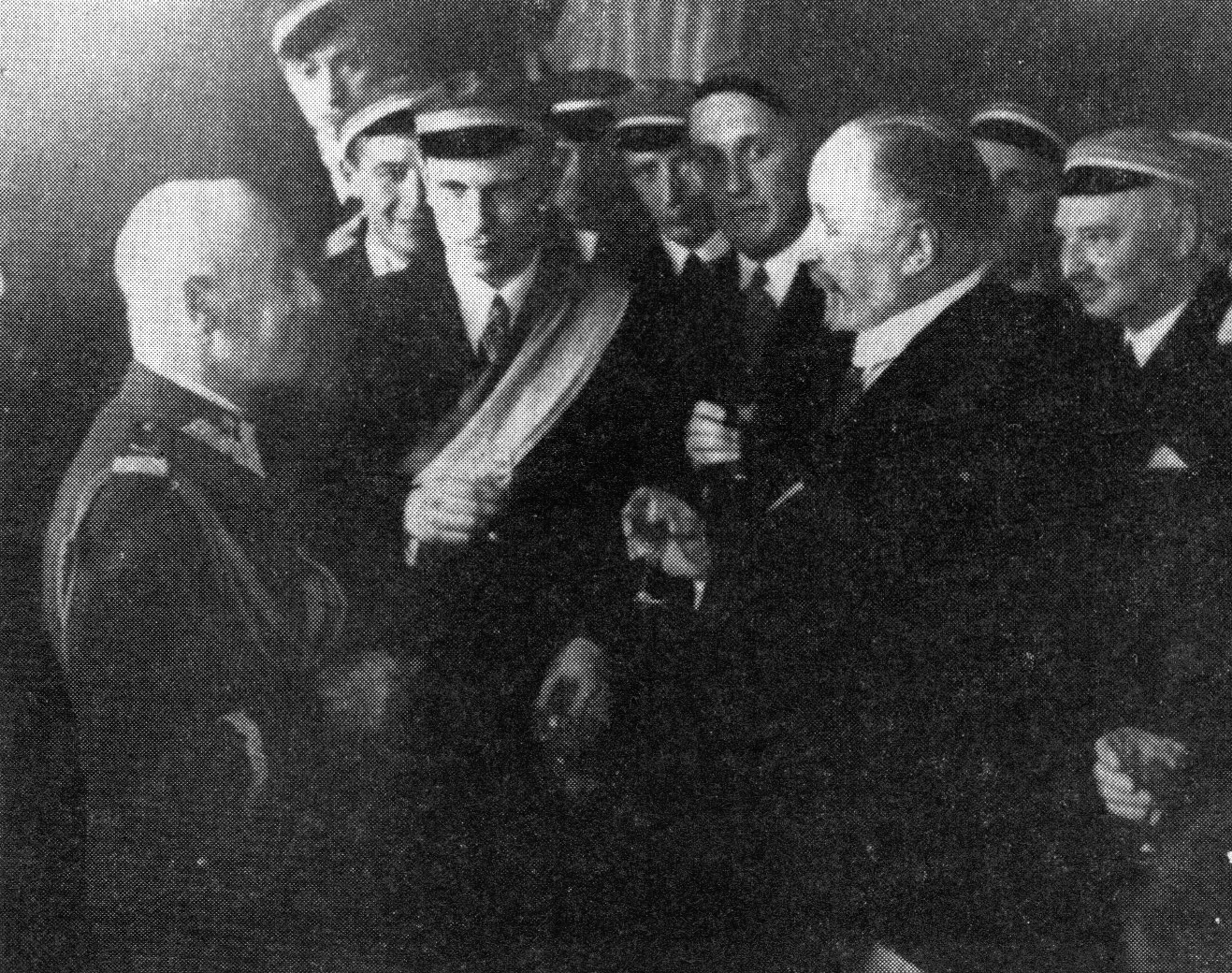
Members of Konwent Polonia (1937)

Konwent Polonia (Polish: Konwent Polonia, Polish full name Korporacja Akademicka Konwent Polonia) is a Polish student corporation. It is the oldest active Polish student corporation.

== History ==
Korporacja Akademicka Konwent Polonia was established in 1828 at the Imperial University of Dorpat, now University of Tartu, in Tartu, Estonia. Konwent Polonia was originally a regional and patriotic organization. It was modeled after the Philomath League and the Assembly of Philaretes (Polish: Zgromadzenie Filaretów), underground groups for Polish students at Vilnius University in Vilnius, Lithuania.

Konwent Polonia is not affiliated with the defunct Saint Petersburg fraternity, Polonia, and the German university fraternities of the same name, located in Berlin, Breslau, Greifswald, and Königsberg.

Many members of Konwent Polonia participated in the November Uprising in 1830 and 1831, leading to a brief suspension of the corporation's operations. It was reactivated in 1834. Konwent Polonia's members also took part in the January Uprising in 1863 and 1864, especially in the partisan struggle in the Samogitia region of Lithuania. Many members lost their lives during the revolt. Under Russian suppression in the following years, the corporation continued to meet in secret. Some of its members were deported to Siberia, while many others emigrated.

On December 5, 1909, an agreement or cartel was reached with Korporacja Akademicka Arkonia, another Polish student association. Shortly afterward, the Russian authorities approved the operation of a Polonia Old Boys' Association (Polish: Koło Filistrów Polonii). Polonia held a large ball in Warsaw in 1911. Another ball followed in 1914 at the Aristocratic Club in Vilnius.

After World War I, the fraternity's headquarters was moved to Vilnius in 1919. In 1923, a cartel was formed with the Korporacja Akademicka Welecja, followed by the Jagielloniaand on October 14, 1928. In 1933, Polonia was one of the founding members of the Association of Polish Student Fraternities (Polish: Związek Polskich Korporacji Akademickich). In the same year, a cartel was formed with the Estonian fraternity Fraternitas Estica.

During World War II, the fraternity was forced to continue its activities in secret. Members split over the Allies and Axis powers, with 83 being killed in action or while in German and Soviet captivity. Under the Lithuanian SSR rule in 1939 after the war, student fraternal associations were banned. Members living in exile in London organized the Philister Circle.

On May 3, 1998, Konwent Polonia was reconstituted in Gdansk, Poland, and began recruiting new members. In 2005, the corporation acquired a new building and moved its headquarters to Sopot, Poland. In 2015, Konwent Polonia organized and hosted the 52nd edition of the Baltic Nations Commune, a meeting of male and female academic corporations from the Baltic countries a biannual meeting that rotates between Estonia, Germany, Latvia, and Poland.

== Symbols ==
Konwent Polonia's colors are amaranth, blue, and white, chosen to represent the three parts of the Republic of Three Nations: the Crown (Kingdom of Poland), Lithuania (Grand Duchy of Lithuania ) and Ruthenia. These are used on its coat of arms, banner, and cap. The corporations cap has a magenta top with a star on top and a blue and white border. Its badge is a silver shield with the colors diagonally and its monogram or Zirkel.

Konwent Polonia's coat of arms includes a shield divided into three colors, to symbolize the three parts of the Republic of Three Nations. The shield is divided into four fields, each with a different symbol. The symbols include the corporation's zirkel in the center, the Eagle, the Pursuit, and the Archangel Michael. Above the shield is a helmet with a crown and medallion, topped by three ostrich feathers, one in each of its colors. Below the shield is a sash with the motto Jeden za wszystkich wszyscy za jednego ("One for all and all for one!").

== Notable members ==
Konwent Polonia has initiated some 1,600 members from 1828 to the present day. Some of its notable members include:

- Osman Achmatowicz (1899–1988), chemist, rector of the Łódź University of Technology
- Józef Brudziński (1874–1917), physician and rector of the University of Warsaw
- Juliusz Bursche (1862–1942), Bishop of the Evangelical-Augsburg Church in Poland
- Tytus Chałubiński (1820–1889), pathologist and researcher of the Tatra Mountains
- Aleksander Czekanowski (1833–1876), geologist and explorer of Siberia
- Benedykt Dybowski (1833–1930), anthropologist, naturalist, and explorer of Siberia
- Karol Kirst (1885–1953), lawyer, trade union activist, and politician who served as Voivode of Białystok Voivodeship
- Bolesław Limanowski (1835–1935), historian, sociologist, and politician
- Wincenty Lutosławski (1863–1954), philosopher, literary critic, publicist, and professor at the Stefan Batory University, the Jagiellonian University, and the Polish Academy of Arts and Sciences
- Gustaw Manteuffel (1832–1916), historian, ethnologist, and a pioneer of modern historiography of Livonia
- Jakub Natanson (1832–1884), chemist, professor at the Main School in Warsaw, and one of the discoverers of Fuchsine
- Andrzej Niemojewski (1864–1921), social and political activist, poet, rationalist, and writer
- Leopold Otto (1819–1882), Lutheran pastor in Warsaw and a national activist
- Józef Siemiradzki (1858–1933), paleontologist and professor at the Jan Kazimierz University
- Ludwik Teichmann (1823–1895), anatomist, professor and rector of the Jagiellonian University, and inventor of the method of detecting traces of blood used in forensic medicine
- Józef Weyssenhoff (1860–1932), novelist, poet, literary critic, and publisher
- Bronisław Zaleski (1819–1880), political activist, writer, and publisher
- Marian Zdziechowski (1861–1938), critic, literary historian, philosopher, professor of Jagiellonian University, and professor, dean, and rector of the Stefan Batory University

== See also ==
- Polish heraldry
