= Stefan Bądzyński =

Polish activist and politician (1869–1928)

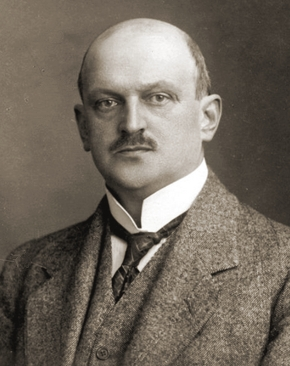

Voivode of Białystok Voivodeship
- In office 1 February 1920 – 18 October 1920
- President: Józef Piłsudski
- Prime Minister: Leopold Skulski
- Preceded by: Position created
- Succeeded by: Stefan Popielawski

Personal details
- Born: September 7, 1869
- Died: 1928
- Citizenship: Poland
- Education: Technical University in Zurich
- Occupation: Social activist, politician

Stefan Bądzyński (September 7, 1869- 1928) was a Polish independence activist and a politician who served as the first Voivode of Białystok Voivodeship.

== Biography ==
In 1893 he graduated from the Faculty of Chemistry at the Technical University in Zürich. Member of the National League, activist of agricultural and trade cooperatives in Congress Poland, director of the agricultural syndicate in Siedlce. In 1914 he was a member of the Polish National Committee in Warsaw. From 22 June to 7 October 1918 he was vice-marshal of the Council of State, representing the Inter-Party Political Circle. In 1918 he became vice-president of the Central Agricultural Society and also served as the director of the agricultural syndicate in Siedlce.

He was considered a seasoned, practical politician, a brave and zealous social activist. On November 19, 1919, the Chief of State Józef Piłsudski appointed him to the office of the Voivode of Białystok Voivodeship which was established four months earlier. At a critical moment for Poland, the Bądzyński, together with his son and daughter, joined the military and went through a difficult campaign in the front of the Polish–Soviet War. After completing it, he was released from his position at his own request. Following his departure from the voivode post he left politics and settled in 24 Mokotowska Street in Warsaw, spending his time between his Warsaw apartment and family estate in Czeberaki.
