= Niamnova Lock =

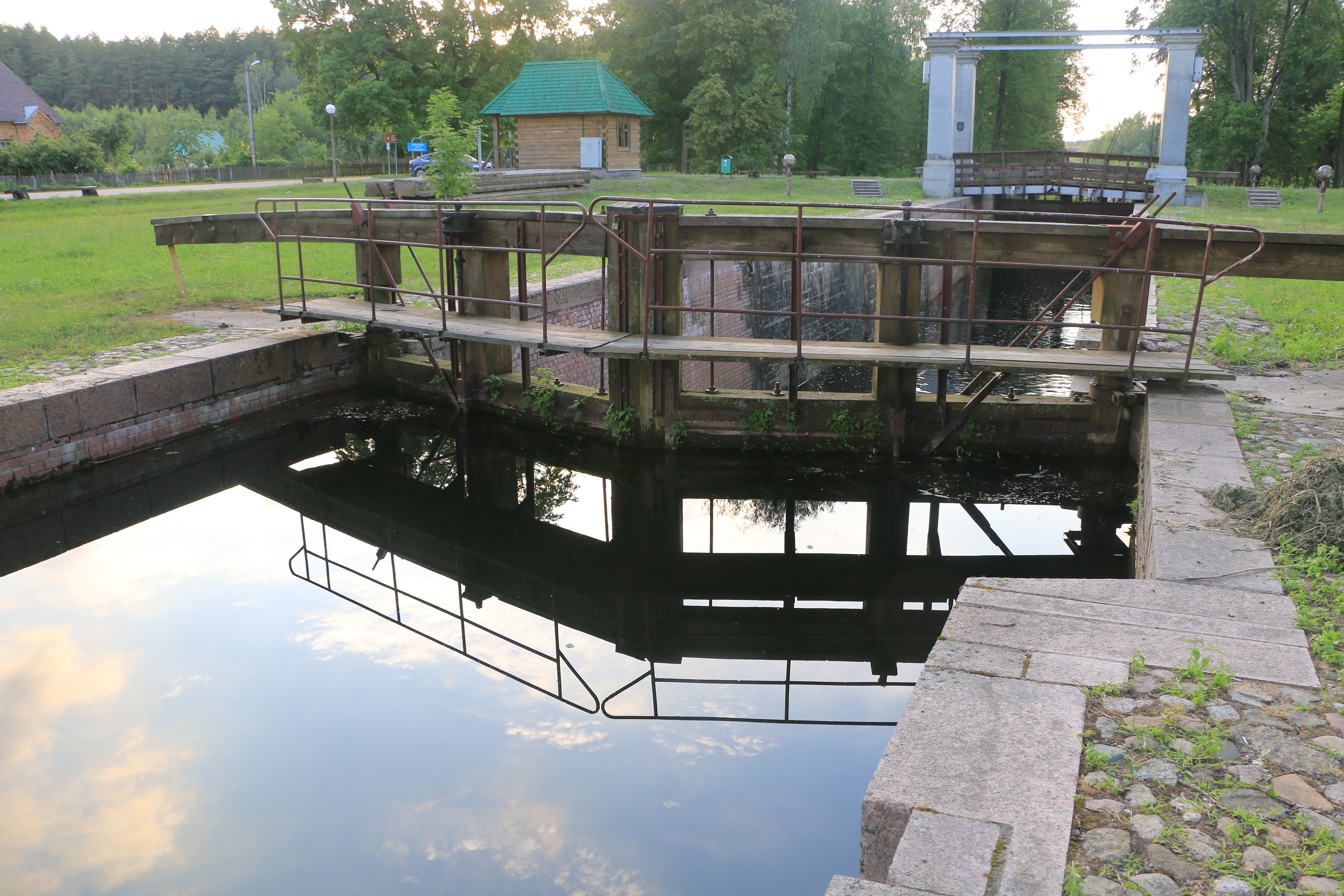
Niamnova Lock

Niamnova Lock (Belarusian: Шлюз «Нямнова») or Niemnowo Lock (Polish: Śluza Niemnowo) is the eighteenth lock on the Augustów Canal (from the Biebrza River), located in Niamnova, built between 1828-1830 by Jan Paweł Lelewel. This is the third lock located on the territory of Belarus and also the last before the merger of the canalized Nieman River. Originally it was three-chamber lock, but during the reconstruction carried out in 2004-2006, the fourth compartment was added because of the changes that have occurred in between the river and its flow conditions. It is the largest lock the Augustów Canal.

- Location: 101.2 km canal
- Level difference: 9.80 m
- Length of chamber: 43.5 m
- Width: 5.90 m
- Gates: Wooden
- Year: 1828 - 1830, rebuilt 2004-2006
- Construction Manager: John Paul Lelewel
