= Stefan Pasławski =

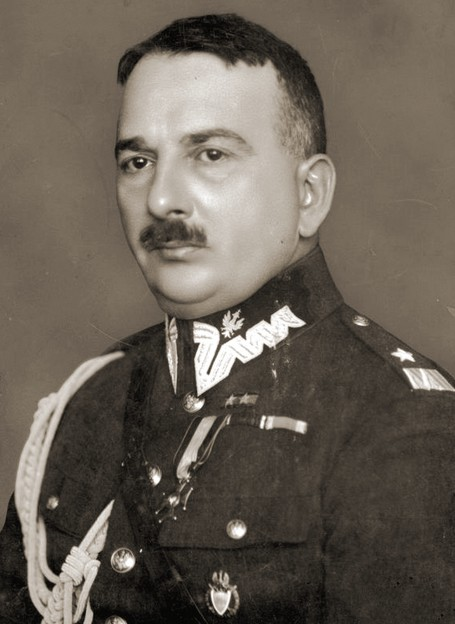

Voivode of Białystok Voivodeship
- In office 29 September 1934 – 14 July 1936
- Preceded by: Stanisław Michałowski
- Succeeded by: Stefan Kirtiklis

Personal details
- Born: May 25, 1885 Warsaw, Kingdom of Poland
- Died: 17 July 1956 (aged 71) Bangor, Wales
- Citizenship: Poland
- Party: BBWR
- Occupation: Military officer, politician
- Awards: Wound Decoration, Virtuti Militari, Order of Polonia Restituta, Cross of Independence, Cross of Valour, Cross of Merit

Military service
- Allegiance: Second Polish Republic
- Branch/service: Polish Army
- Unit: 20th Infantry Division, 29th Infantry Division

Stefan Wiktor Paweł Pasławski (May 25, 1885 in Warsaw - July 17, 1956 in Bangor) was a politician and brigadier general of the Polish Army.

== Biography ==
Stefan Pasławski was born on May 25, 1885, in Warsaw, to Karol and Maria née Litauer. He graduated from the 4th Gymnasium in Lviv and studied law for two years at the University of Lviv. On December 16, 1905, he was elected a member of the faculty of the Academic Reading Room in Lviv (apart from him, also Czesław Mączyński, Tadeusz Wolfenburg). He was a reserve officer of the imperial and royal army. In the period from October 1, 1909, to September 30, 1910, he did his compulsory one-year military service. In the period from July 9, 1908, to July 31, 1914, he was one of the organizers and a member of the Supreme Council of the Bartosz Troops. On August 10, 1914, he joined the Eastern Legion, and after its dissolution, the 3rd Infantry Regiment of the Polish Legions. On October 29, 1914, he was wounded during the Battle of Mołotków. From November 11, 1915, to November 17, 1916, he was the commander of the Assembly and Transport Station for Polish legionnaires (German: Sammel- und Transportstellen für polnische Legionäre) in Budapest, where he organized a library "at a huge expense of work and out of his own pocket".

He served in the Polish Army since 1918. Chief of Staff of the General Command of the "Lublin" District in Lublin, deputy military commander of Warsaw, commander of the Białystok Rifle Regiment, XL Infantry Brigade, divisional infantry of the 20th Infantry Division, and then of the 29th Infantry Division in Grodno.

On May 3, 1922, he was verified in the rank of colonel with seniority from June 1, 1919, and 59th place in the corps of infantry officers. His parent unit was the 79th Infantry Regiment in Słonim. In March 1923, he became deputy commander of the Fortified Camp "Wilno". In November 1925, he was transferred to the Border Protection Corps and appointed commander of the 2nd Border Protection Brigade in Baranowicze. In May 1926, he was transferred to the position of commander of the 6th Border Protection Brigade in Vilnius. In June 1927, he was transferred from the Border Protection Corps to the disposal of the Minister of Military Affairs with a simultaneous transfer to the Ministry of State Treasury to the position of chief inspector of the Customs Guard. He then became the commander-in-chief of the Border Guard. On January 1, 1928, the president of Poland Ignacy Mościcki promoted him to brigadier general with seniority effective January 1, 1928 and 1st place in the corps of generals.

In the years 1928–1934, he commanded Corps District No. VIII in Toruń. On September 30, 1934, he was transferred to inactive status without the right to receive pay.

In the period from September 29, 1934, to July 14, 1936, he was the Voivode of Białystok Voivodeship, and from July 14, 1936 to January 20, 1939, the voivode of Stanisławów Voivodeship. In June 1938, he received the title of honorary member of the Young Village Association of the Stanisławów Voivodeship. On January 20, 1939, he was appointed director of the Inspection Office in the Central Board of the Ministry of the Interior. On April 24, 1939, he was transferred from inactive status to retired status.

After the Invasion of Poland, he left Poland to Romania on the night of 17th to 18 September. Initially he stayed in Tulcea with people assigned to the Ministry of Military Affairs and then on September 30, in a group of 24 generals, he was sent to an officers' hotel in Băile Herculane, and later at the end of May 1940 he was transferred to Târgoviște in a camp of a military division. In October 1940 he was again moved, to a camp in Călimănești. From spring 1941 to spring 1945, he was in German captivity. From February 1941 to October 1942, he was a prisoner of war in Oflag VI-B in Dössel. In exile in France, then in Great Britain, from August 1951 he lived in the Polish Settlement in Penrhos (Wales). In his last years he was working on a Polish proverbs dictionary. In 1955 he was diagnosed with diabetes and in 1956 with bladder cancer. He passed an unsuccessful surgery and died on July 17, 1956, in Bangor, Wales.

His wife was Aleksandra Pasławska, née Judycka (d. 1944), who was the chairwoman of the District of the Polish Scouting Association in Stanisławów.
