= Henryk Ostaszewski =

Polish politician

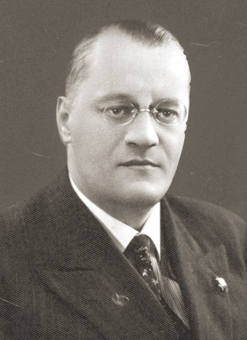
- Ostaszewski in 1937

Voivode of Białystok Voivodeship
- In office 9 November 1937 – 10 September 1939
- President: Ignacy Mościcki
- Prime Minister: Felicjan Sławoj Składkowski
- Preceded by: Stefan Kirtiklis
- Succeeded by: Position abolished

Personal details
- Born: 20 May 1892 Lwow, Austria-Hungary
- Died: 25 March 1957 (aged 64) Grenoble, France
- Citizenship: Poland
- Education: University of Lviv
- Occupation: Social activist, politician
- Awards: Order of Polonia Restituta, Cross of Merit

Military service
- Allegiance: Second Polish Republic

Henryk Ostaszewski (May 20, 1892 - March 25, 1957) was a Polish politician who served as the vice-mayor of Piotrków Trybunalski (1922–1924) and Kalisz (1924–1927), and mayor of Łęczyca (1927–1931) and Kalisz (1931–1937) and Voivode of Białystok Voivodeship from 1937 to 1939.

== Biography ==
He was the son of Stanisław and Henryka Ostaszewski of the Ostoja-Ostaszewski family. He graduated from high school in Lviv and later from the Faculty of Law at the University of Lviv.

In his memoirs "Requiem for the gentry", the memoirist Mieczysław Jałowiecki humorously described how Henryk Ostaszewski saved himself by escaping during the workers’ riots that took place in Kalisz in February 1926. When the "disturbed crowd", broke into the city hall, "Mr. Ostoja-Ostaszewski, ...despite a severe limp on his right leg, with an agility incomprehensible to a mortal, jumped out of the window of the council chamber onto the cornice of the first floor... Those gathered in the square greeted this bold feat of the starost with enthusiastic shouts and from that time on the nickname Ostoja was changed to Gzyms and Mr. Henryk was called Gzyms-Ostaszewski".

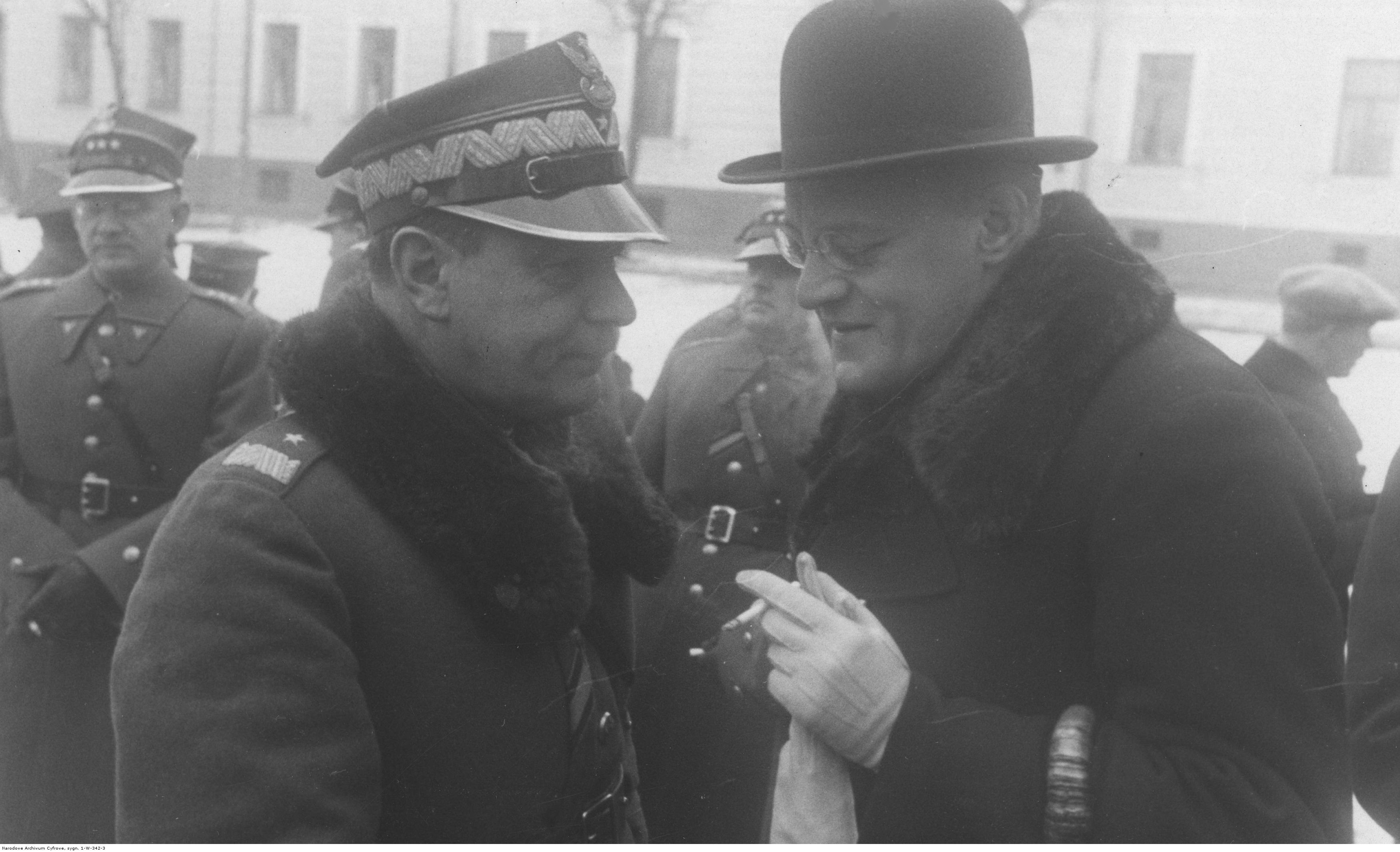
Ostaszewski as Voivode of Białystok Voivodeship talking to Czesław Młot-Fijałkowski

In September 1937, Prime Minister Sławoj-Składkowski entrusted him with the duties of the Voivode of Białystok Voivodeship. In December, the Council of Ministers accepted a motion to appoint him voivode, and on January 7, 1938, the nomination was signed by President Ignacy Mościcki. When, after a series of nominations of new voivodes, a certain lady accused the Prime Minister and Minister of Internal Affairs Felicjan Sławoj Składkowski in the Senate that "some voivodes fall from the sky", the Prime Minister replied to her: "This is very figuratively put. I have appointed five voivodes and I would like you to kindly indicate which of them 'fell from the sky'. [...] Białystok Voivode Ostaszewski was a long-time starost of Kalisz and from starost he had just been promoted to voivode".

As voivode, Ostaszewski focused on the rapid development of the economically backward Białystok Voivodeship. He announced a 4-year plan to provide schools with radio broadcasts, because only every sixth educational institution in Białystok had a radio receiver. However, he did not manage to implement this plan due to the outbreak of the war.

After the invasion of Nazi Germany to Poland in September 1939, he issued an order to begin the partial evacuation of state offices and institutions from Białystok. On September 10, 1939, in view of the worsening situation on the front, he issued further evacuation orders and left Białystok on the night of September 10–11.

He emigrated to France and died in Grenoble on March 25, 1957. He was buried in the local Saint Roch Cemetery.

As a 32-year-old deputy mayor of Kalisz, he fell in love with a five-year-younger clerk of the Kalisz starosta, Amelia Haake, whom he married on August 16, 1924. His wife died on May 24, 1969, and was buried at the Protestant cemetery in Kalisz.
