= Marian Rembowski =

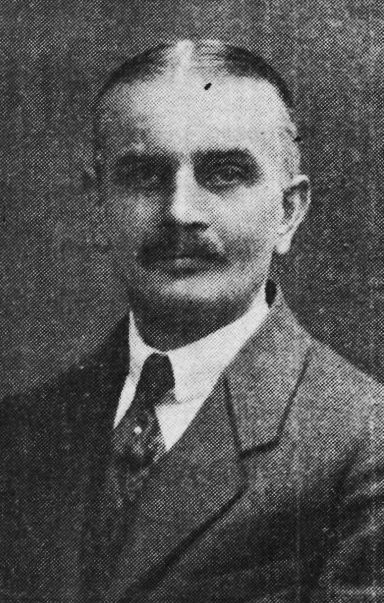

Voivode of Białystok Voivodeship
- In office 12 August 1924 – 24 November 1927
- President: Stanisław Wojciechowski
- Preceded by: Stefan Popielawski
- Succeeded by: Karol Kirst

Personal details
- Born: 9 June 1878 Nowa Wieś, Congress Poland
- Died: 20 April 1961 (aged 82)
- Citizenship: Poland
- Education: Lviv Polytechnic
- Occupation: Social activist, politician
- Awards: Order of Polonia Restituta

Marian Rembowski (9 June 1878 in Nowa Wieś - 20 April 1961) was a Polish politician and civil servant who served as the Voivode of Łódź Voivodeship and Białystok Voivodeship.

== Biography ==
He was born in Sieradz County as the third son of Klemens and Teodora née Wierzchlejska, originally from Karsznice. Nowa Wieś was the family nest of the Rembowski family, Ślepowron coat of arms. His father, an insurgent in 1863, was a lieutenant in the cavalry brigade of General Edmund Taczanowski, and at the end of the 19th century a long-time president of the Land Credit Society.

After graduating from high school in Łódź, Marian entered the Faculty of Machine Design at the Lviv Polytechnic, where he obtained an engineering degree in 1903. On June 18, 1904, he married Jadwiga Kopystyńska, with whom he had a son, Marian Stanisław. He started working at the "Borman i Szwede" Mechanical Plant, and after a few years at the "Orthwein, Karasiński i S-ka" machine and casting factory.

After the outbreak of World War I, he was evacuated with the factory to the Ekaterinoslav Governorate. He returned to Warsaw in 1918. At the end of that year, he was appointed government commissioner in Sieradz, and in March 1919 in Kalisz, where he soon became the starosta of the Kalisz district. On February 23, 1923, he took up the position of Voivode of Łódź Voivodeship, and at the request of Marshal Józef Piłsudski, on August 12, 1924, he became the Voivode of Białystok Voivodeship.

On May 2, 1923, he was awarded the Officer's Cross of the Order of Polonia Restituta.

The lack of support for the May Coup in 1926 resulted in his dismissal from this position on 24 November 1927. Rembowski returned to work in industry. During the German occupation, he was involved in social activities and worked in the agencies of the Central Welfare Council. After the fall of the Warsaw Uprising, he ended up in Kraków via the camp in Pruszków. He reached retirement age in Kraków. He died on 20 April 1961. He was buried at the Rakowicki Cemetery (military cemetery at Prandoty Street).
