= Karol Kirst =

Polish politician (1885–1953)

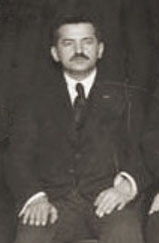

Voivode of Białystok Voivodeship
- In office 24 November 1927 – 10 July 1930
- President: Ignacy Mościcki
- Preceded by: Marian Rembowski
- Succeeded by: Marian Zyndram-Kościałkowski

Personal details
- Born: 7 January 1885 Łódź, Congress Poland
- Died: 13 May 1953 (aged 68)
- Resting place: Powązki Cemetery, Warsaw
- Citizenship: Poland
- Party: BBWR
- Occupation: Social activist, politician
- Awards: Order of Polonia Restituta, Cross of Merit, Medal for Long Service

Karol Kirst (born January 7, 1885, in Łódź, died May 13, 1953, there) was a Polish lawyer, trade union activist and politician who served as Voivode of Białystok Voivodeship in the years 1927–1930.

== Biography ==
He was born on January 7, 1885, in Łódź, to Edward and Natalia née Olex-Majewski. He graduated from the 4th Gymnasium in Warsaw. He studied at the Faculty of Law of the University of Warsaw. In 1903/1904 he withdrew from the university in connection with the campaign to boycott Russian universities. In 1910 he graduated from the Faculty of Law of the University of Dorpat. There he belonged to the Konwent Polonia academic corporation. After completing his studies, he was a trainee at the District Court in Warsaw, from 1912 an assistant to a sworn attorney, then a sworn attorney in Odessa and a legal adviser to the Russian Shipping and Trade Association in Odessa. In 1917 he was elected a city councilor of Odessa from the Polish group.

From 1918 he was a justice of the peace in Lipno, a clerk and adviser in the Ministry of Labor and Social Welfare, an adviser and head of a department in the Ministry of Justice, in the years 1918–1919 in the Secretariat of the Trade Union of Agricultural Workers of the Republic of Poland. In the years 1919-1920 he was the manager of the office of the Committee for the Defense of Silesia in Częstochowa. An activist of the PSL "Wyzwolenie". From December 1924 a judge of the Court of Appeal in Lviv, later director of the Political Department, and then the Administrative Department of the Ministry of Internal Affairs. From November 24, 1927, to July 10, 1930, he served as the Voivode of Białystok Voivodeship, then a prosecutor, and from February 14, 1934, a judge of the Supreme Court of Poland. He was a member of the Nonpartisan Bloc for Cooperation with the Government.

Buried in the Powązki Cemetery in Warsaw (section 49-3-4).
