= Stefan Kirtiklis =

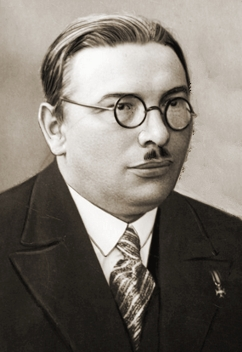

Voivode of Białystok Voivodeship
- In office 17 July 1936 – 9 September 1937
- President: Ignacy Mościcki
- Prime Minister: Felicjan Sławoj Składkowski
- Preceded by: Stefan Pasławski
- Succeeded by: Henryk Ostaszewski

Personal details
- Born: January 8, 1890 Kolno, Congress Poland
- Died: 24 June 1951 (aged 61) Magdalenka, Polish People's Republic
- Resting place: Srebrzysko Cemetery
- Citizenship: Poland
- Education: University of Brussels
- Occupation: Social activist, politician
- Awards: Virtuti Militari, Order of Polonia Restituta, Cross of Valour, Cross of Merit of the Army of Central Lithuania

Military service
- Allegiance: Second Polish Republic
- Branch/service: Polish Army

Stefan Kirtiklis (January 8, 1890 – June 24, 1951) was a Polish politician associated with the Piłsudski camp, participant in the fight for independence, major of the Polish Army gendarmerie and a Voivode.

== Early years and family ==
Stefan Kirtiklis was born in Kolno, a town then in Congress Poland. His father was Andrzej, a teacher, and his mother, Agnieszka née Prusińskain. The surname Kirtiklis is of Lithuanian origin.

He attended a real school (szkoła realna, a type of secondary school), where in the years 1904–1905, he took an active part in political life. From 1905, he was associated with the independence socialist movement th Polish Socialist Party (PPS) and its Combat Organization and PPS-Revolutionary Faction).

For his active participation in school strikes, he was arrested by the tsarist authorities of the Russian Partition and imprisoned in an investigative prison. After being released due to his young age, he graduated from the real school and was then forced to go abroad. While a political émigré in Brussels, he studied at the Faculty of Economics of the Free University of Brussels 1909–1913 .

In 1918, he married Janina Kirtiklisowa (née Szymański, 1897–1987), whom he met during his activity in the PPS. Janina later became a member of the parliament of the Second Polish Republic for the 3rd term, on behalf of the Nonpartisan Bloc for Cooperation with the Government (BBWR) and a member of the authorities of the Women's Civic Work Union. Stefan and Janina had two daughters: Anna Barbara and Maria Magdalena.

== Military ==
From 1914 to 1917, Kirtiklis worked in the Polish Military Organization, initially in Warsaw, then in the districts of Łomża, Zagłębie Górnicze, Piotrków Trybunalski and in District VI of this organization in Kielce (from May 1 to October 19, 1916) . Following Poland's regaining of independence in 1918, he joined the Polish Army. In December 1918 he took up the position of inspector of the People's Militia (organization associated with the PPS), then he held the position of liaison officer at the Civil Administration of the Eastern Lands in Vilnius.

At the beginning of 1919 he took an active part in the march to Vilnius and in the battles near Vilnius. After the occupation of Vilnius, Kirtiklis organized and commanded a militia battalion in that city. Then he held a number of managerial positions in the field gendarmerie in Vilnius, Minsk and other cities.

After the Polish occupation of Vilnius by the troops of General Lucjan Żeligowski in 1920 he was nominated to be the head of the security service of Central Lithuania. In April 1921, he was nominated to be the commander of the 1st Field Gendarmerie Battalion.

After completing a higher officer course in Grudziądz, in 1924 he was appointed to the position of commander of the 3rd Gendarmerie Battalion in Grodno, which he held until January 1927. He then served in the Border Protection Corps and was the head of the Security Department of the Provincial Office in Vilnius. While serving in this position, he remained at the disposal of the Minister of Internal Affairs and on the register of the Gendarmerie Officers' Staff.

== Public offices ==
On November 15, 1928, Kirtiklis was promoted in the Voivodeship Office in Vilnius from a provisional head of department in the 6th service rank to head of department in the 5th service rank, entrusted with the function of the vice-voivode of Vilnius. From 20 December 1930 to 20 June 1931 he was the voivode of Vilnius, then from July to November 1931 the vice-voivode of Łódź Voivodeship, from 21 November 1931 to 14 July 1936 the voivode of Pomeranian Voivodeship, and finally from 17 July 1936 to 9 September 1937 the voivode of Białystok Voivodeship. On 11 September 1937 he went into inactive status, retired in mid-1938, and settled in Vilnius. He became involved with Walery Sławek's group. In the Vilnius area he was also the chairman of the Federation of Polish Unions of Defenders of the Homeland, chairman of the Union of Polish Legionnaires and the Union of Polish People's Party.

On November 11, 1934, the Kościerzyna City Council awarded Stefan Kirtiklis the title of Honorary Citizen of Kościerzyna.

== War time experiences ==
After the occupation of Vilnius by the Red Army and the Soviet occupation of Lithuania, Kirtiklis was arrested by the NKVD in October 1940 and deported to a camp on the Pechora River, in Komi, where he stayed until March 1942. Liberated after the Sikorski–Mayski agreement, he left the Soviet Union as a civilian refugee with the Anders' Army in the summer of 1942 and settled in Palestine.

From 1943, he was a member of the board of the Union of Polish Patriots in Palestine in the Middle East. From March to May 1944, he co-edited the press organ of the Union of Entrepreneurs and Employers (ZPP), Biuletyn Wolnej Polski ('Free Poland Bulletin'). He tried to leave for Moscow, where he was summoned at the end of 1944. After this, on April 30, 1945, he arrived in Warsaw and took up the position of deputy director of a department in the Ministry of Supply and Trade, later working in the Ministry of Recovered Territories as a department director.

== Later years ==
After being dismissed from his job in administration, in 1950 Kirtiklis settled in Magdalenka near Warsaw. He died there in 1951. He was buried at the Srebrzysko Cemetery in Gdańsk (area X).
