= Marian Zyndram-Kościałkowski =

Polish politician, freemason and military officer

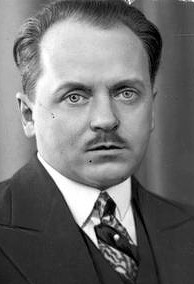

27th Prime Minister of Poland
- In office 13 October 1935 – 15 May 1936
- President: Ignacy Mościcki
- Preceded by: Walery Sławek
- Succeeded by: Felicjan Sławoj Składkowski

Minister of Interior
- In office 28 June 1934 – 12 October 1935
- Prime Minister: Leon Kozłowski; Walery Sławek
- Preceded by: Leon Kozłowski
- Succeeded by: Władysław Raczkiewicz

28th Mayor of Warsaw
- In office 2 March 1934 – 28 June 1934
- Preceded by: Zygmunt Słomiński
- Succeeded by: Stefan Starzyński

Voivode of Białystok Voivodeship
- In office 10 July 1930 – 8 March 1934
- Preceded by: Karol Kirst
- Succeeded by: Stanisław Michałowski

Personal details
- Born: 16 March 1892 Pandėlys, Kovno Governorate, Russian Empire
- Died: 12 April 1946 (aged 54) Brookwood, United Kingdom
- Party: Polish People's Party; BBWR
- Occupation: Politician, soldier

Marian Zyndram-Kościałkowski (Polish pronunciation: [ˈmarjan ˈzɨndram kɔɕt͡ɕawˈkɔfskʲi]; 16 March 1892 – 12 April 1946, aliases "Jerzy Orwid", "M. Rogiński") was a Polish politician, freemason and military officer who served as voivode of Białystok Voivodeship in 1930-1934, Mayor of Warsaw in 1934 and 27th Prime Minister of Poland from 1935 to 1936.

== Early years ==
Marian Zyndram-Kościałkowski was born in his family’s real estate of Pandėlys, located in the Novoalexandrovsky Uyezd of the Kovno Governorate of the Russian Empire (today Lithuania), to Karol and Maria Budrewicz. He came from a noble background that used the Syrokomla coat of arms. In 1903, Marian went to Saint Petersburg where he attended middle and high school. After graduation in 1910, he began studying at the local Neurological Institute. Also, he studied agriculture at Riga Technical University.

In 1911, Zyndram-Kościałkowski became a member of the Union of Active Struggle (ZWC), Polish independence organization. Together with Walery Sławek, he was a co-founder of structures of the ZWC in northwestern corner of the Russian Empire. In 1912, he was named commandant of the ZWC in the Baltic provinces of Russia, and in the summer of 1914, after the outbreak of World War I, he planned to join Polish Legions in World War I, but was ordered to stay in Warsaw. In 1915, he joined Polish Military Organisation (POW), using nom de guerre Jerzy Orwid. On February 7, 1915, Józef Piłsudski promoted him to Podporucznik (Second Lieutenant). In the same year, he married fellow member of the POW, Anna Krysińska. In 1918, their son Witold was born, with Piłsudski as the godfather.

== 1918–1921 ==
In late 1918, Zyndram-Kościałkowski joined the newly created Polish Army, and in 1919 he was transferred to the Second Department of Polish General Staff. He was actively involved in the activities of Polish intelligence in the areas of Suwałki and southern Lithuania. In April 1919, he came to Wilno (Vilnius), and soon afterwards, Józef Piłsudski ordered him to carry out sabotage attacks in the rear of the Red Army.

In September 1920, Zyndram-Kościałkowski was named commandant of the Bieniakonie Group, which was part of Volunteer Division (Colonel Adam Koc). Together with this unit, he participated in Żeligowski's Mutiny, which resulted in creation of the Republic of Central Lithuania. In 1920 - 1922, Zyndram-Kościałkowski commanded Second Department (Intelligence) of the General Staff of Central Lithuania’s Armed Forces.

== 1920s ==
In 1922, Zyndram-Kościałkowski joined Polish People's Party "Wyzwolenie", to be soon named leader of this party (until 1925). As a deputy of the Land of Wilno to the Polish Sejm, he was released from the military. Zyndram-Kościałkowski remained in the parliament until 1939.

In the early 1920s, he was a member of a Freemason’s Lodge “Tomasz Zan”, and in April 1925, after abandoning Polish People's Party "Wyzwolenie", he co-created the so-called Parliamentary Labour Club (Klub Pracy, later renamed into Labour Party), together with Kazimierz Bartel. Zyndram-Kościałkowski did not play any significant role in the 1926 May Coup. As key member of the Labour Party, he supported the Sanacja movement, and in May 1927 became a member of the Warsaw City Council. At the same time, he was a deputy chairman of the Association of Army Reservists, and leading member of Association of Polish Cities. In the Parliament, he was responsible for the budget of the Ministry of Military Affairs for the year 1927/28.

Following the 1928 Polish legislative election, Zyndram-Kościałkowski was again elected from the District of Wilno. In March 1928, he became deputy chairman of the Nonpartisan Bloc for Cooperation with the Government (BBWR), and in June, his Labour Party joined the BBWR, as autonomous organization.

Zyndram-Kościałkowski was regarded as an avid supporter of Józef Piłsudski. In defence of his policies, in 1922, he challenged General Józef Haller to a duel.

== 1930s ==
In November 1930, following the parliamentary election Zyndram-Kościałkowski once again became a member of parliament (he was 17th on the list of the Nonpartisan Bloc for Cooperation with the Government (BBWR).

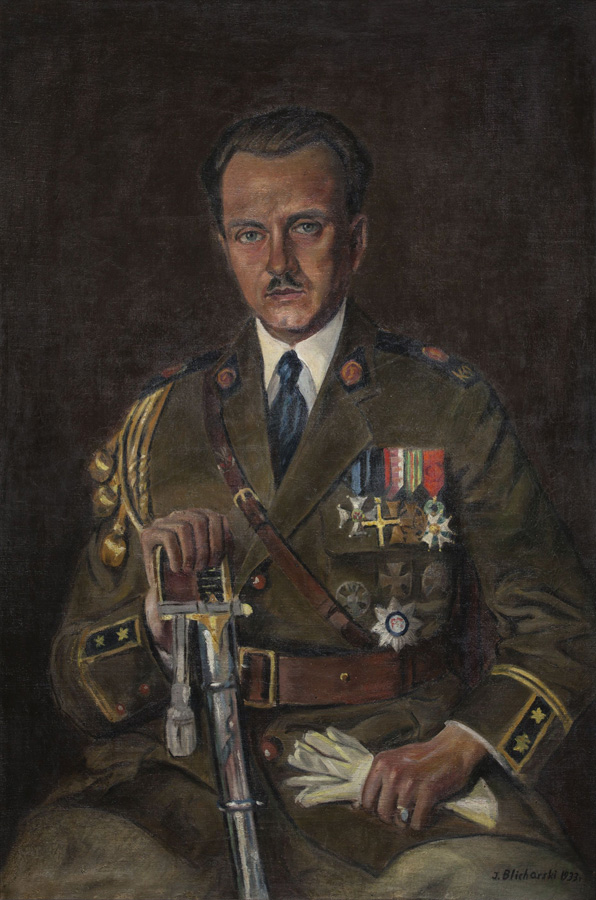
Portrait of Marian Zyndram-Kościałkowski by Józef Blicharski (1933)

On 20 July 1930 Zyndram-Kościałkowski was named Voivode of Białystok Voivodeship, remaining there until late February 1934. He improved local administration, built sewer system and paved streets of Białystok. He also founded the unemployment committee and Agricultural Chamber. Due to his efforts, local entrepreneurs presented their products at the Northern Trade Fair in Wilno. Also, he was one of co-founders of sports club Jagiellonia Białystok. To honor his work, on 4 September 1935 Zyndram-Kościałkowski was named Honorary Citizen of Białystok, and a boulevard was named after him at Planty Park.

During his tenure as voivode of Białystok Voivodeship, one most tragic events in the voivodeship took place in July 1933 in Supraśl. Police officers, trying to disperse a crowd of striking workers, used live ammunition and killed two men. Marian Zyndram-Kościałkowski did not give an order to use weapons, the action was directed on the spot by the vice-starosta. Later, however, a commission appointed by Sikorski's voivode in exile blamed the then voivode of Białystok for the course of this pacification. In June 3, Ukrainian nationalists murdered Bronislaw Pieracki, the Minister of Internal Affairs, which changed Koscialkowski's situation. The Sanation camp decided to use Zyndram-Kościałkowski's effectiveness in the vacant position. In March 1934, after Marian Zyndram-Kościałkowski was transferred to the position of commissioner mayor of Warsaw, his duties were taken over, in accordance with the law, by vice-voivode Stanisław Michałowski. As a minister, he tried to streamline local administration, and reach an agreement with moderate Ukrainian organizations. In the summer of 1935, Polish authorities reached a compromise with the Ukrainian National Democratic Alliance (UNDO), and as a result, the UNDO took place in the 1935 Polish legislative election.

After the death of Józef Piłsudski (12 May 1935), the Sanacja camp was divided into two factions: those gathered around President Ignacy Mościcki, and the followers of Marshal Edward Śmigły-Rydz. In August 1935, Mościcki agreed with Minister Eugeniusz Kwiatkowski that changes must be made in the government of Walery Sławek. Kwiatkowski entered the cabinet, while Zyndram-Kościałkowski was appointed to the post of Prime Minister.

On 13 October 1935 Marian Zyndram-Kościałkowski was nominated to the post of Prime Minister of Poland. His government excluded the so-called Piłsudski's colonels, which was supported by the public opinion. Due to the economical difficulties of the mid-1930s, Eugeniusz Kwiatkowski, who was Minister of Industry and Trade, played a key role in the government. In December 1935, amnesty of political prisoners was declared, but Zyndram-Kościałkowski decided not to close the Bereza Kartuska prison. In the spring of 1936, Socialist and Communist organizations initiated a series of anti-government demonstrations. Strikes and protests took place all over the country: on 20–25 March a sit-down strike took place at the Semperit Plant in Kraków. The protest was broken by the riot police, with several people killed or injured. In Lwów, the police killed 9 people, wounding over 200. These social disturbances undermined the position of Zyndram-Kościałkowski and his cabinet.

On 15 May 1936 President Mościcki demoted Zyndram-Kościałkowski, replacing him with Felicjan Sławoj Składkowski. Zyndram-Kościałkowski was appointed Minister of Labour in the new government, remaining in post until 30 September 1939.

== Exile and death ==
After the Invasion of Poland, Zyndram-Kościałkowski was interned in Romania. He then moved to France and Great Britain. New Prime Minister in Exile, General Władysław Sikorski sent him to a camp for political opponents, on the Isle of Bute in Scotland. His new partner, actress Maria Balcerkiewicz, was interned with him. They later became engaged, but he died before they could get married.

Marian Zyndram-Kościałkowski died on 12 April 1946 in Brookwood, Surrey.

== Military ranks ==
- Lieutenant – 2 XII 1918
- Captain – 1 XII 1919
- Major – 1924
- Subcolonel – 14 XII 1931

== Honors and awards ==
- Silver Cross of the Virtuti Militari (1921),
- Commander Cross of the Polonia Restituta (1931)
- Cross of Independence with Swords,
- Cross of Valour (Poland), four times,
- Cross of Merit of Central Lithuania’s Armed Forces,
- Officer of the Legion of Honour,
- Order of Leopold (Belgium),
- Order of the Cross of the Eagle, First Class.

Political offices
Preceded by Walery Sławek	Prime Minister of Poland; 1935–1936	Succeeded by Felicjan Sławoj Składkowski
