= Stefan Popielawski =

Polish activist and politician (1880–1934)

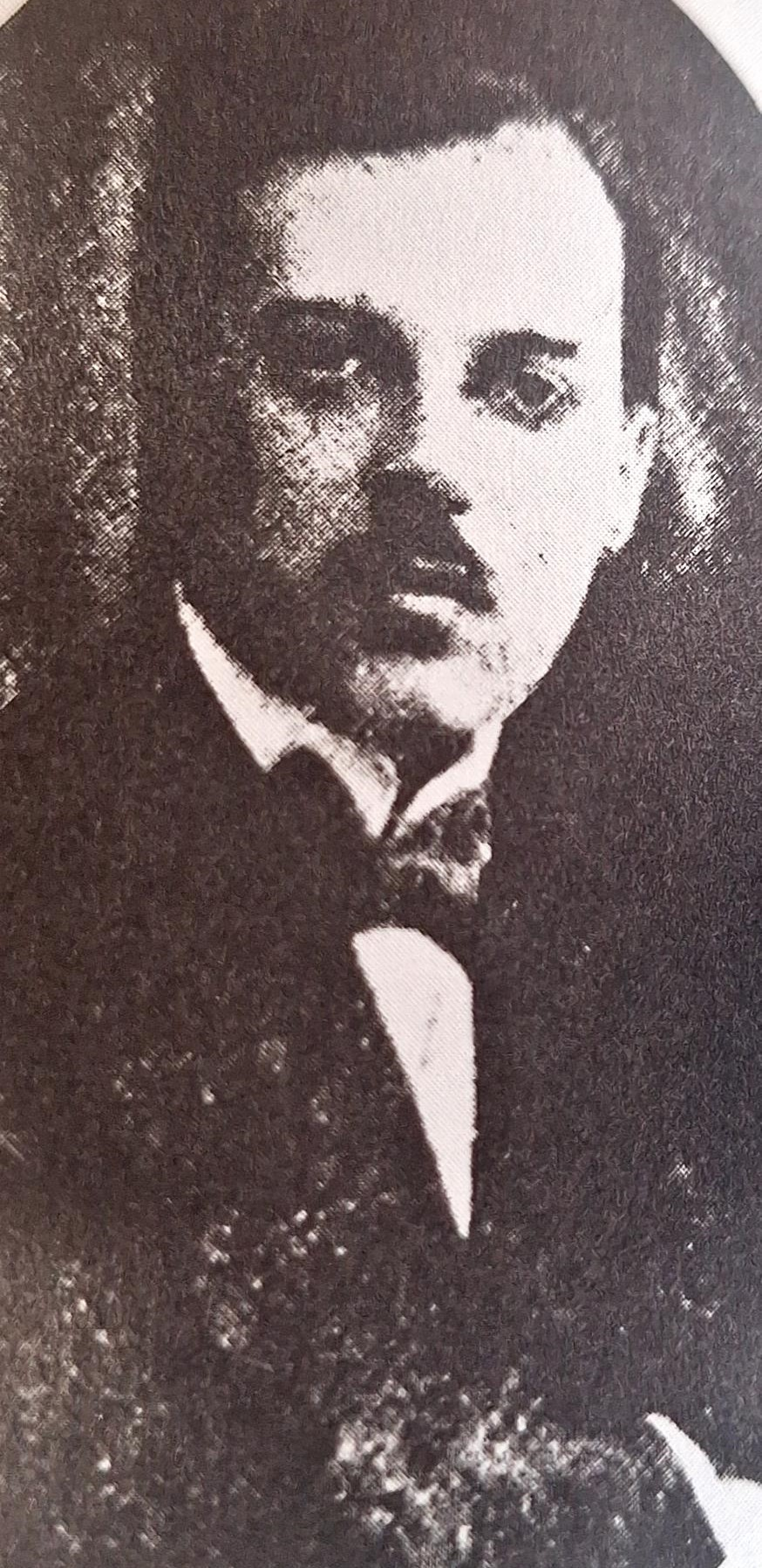

Voivode of Białystok Voivodeship
- In office September 1920 – July 1924
- President: Józef Piłsudski
- Preceded by: Stefan Bądzyński
- Succeeded by: Marian Rembowski

Personal details
- Born: October 18, 1880 Warta, Congress Poland
- Died: 16 December 1934 (aged 54)
- Resting place: Warta, Poland
- Citizenship: Poland
- Education: Technical University in Karlsruhe
- Occupation: Social activist, politician

Stefan Popielawski (October 18, 1880 - December 16, 1934) was a Polish independence activist and a politician who served as the Voivode of Białystok Voivodeship.

== Biography ==
He graduated from high school in Kalisz, then from the Faculty of Chemistry at the Technical University in Karlsruhe. In the years 1906-1917 he worked in weaving enterprises in Łódź. In 1917 he completed a course for employees of higher administration at the University of Warsaw, did an internship at the city hall of Łódź and at the district office in Brzeziny.

In September 1920, he was appointed to the position of director of the Voivodeship Office in Białystok, and a month later he took up the office of Voivode. He signed his first regulation, a memorandum to the District Officers on Combating Rinderpest, on 5 October 1920. He took up his office in a very difficult economic situation in the voivodeship, after the Polish–Soviet War war front had passed in July and August 1920. He focused on activities aimed at improving the supply of basic necessities to the population. From that time on, each starost had to send information to the provincial office every month, by the twentieth day of each month, concerning the population and the number of people subject to additional provisions, and by the fifth day of each month, a list of market prices of basic necessities for the previous month, a step that was aimed at stopping the rampant prices and illegal trade in basic necessities. During this period, Popielawski also took steps to increase food production in the voivodeship. He took care of the development of cattle and pig breeding, and in connection with this, the organization of veterinary services.

On November 1, 1923, the Ministry of Public Health appointed Popielawski as the Extraordinary Commissioner for combating epidemics in the province under his control. He also headed the District Reconstruction Council, whose main goal was to collect funds and encourage society to actively and professionally participate in the reconstruction of the voivodeship, which had been destroyed by six years of war.

As voivode he took numerous actions aimed at reducing unemployment, which severely affected working-class families living in the voivodeship and in Białystok itself. The provincial office took action to find funds to reopen the factories, but it was of little use. During numerous meetings at the voivodeship office, he promised to approach the central authorities with a request to increase the amount of government loans and to actively cooperate with trade unions in order to reduce unemployment and help the unemployed and their families.

The local press published articles from time to time presenting the wrong decisions made by him or criticizing the behaviour of people from his closest circle, although the Popielawski himself was very well-liked and generally respected. He was in the midst of a public outcry when Catholic residents filed a protest to the Ministry of Internal Affairs against the "sinister" activities of voivode Popielawski regarding giving permission to reconstruct an Orthodox church.

His popularity decreased and in June 1923, Dziennik Białostocki published an article saying that Stefan Popielawski as a voivode is a man without energy, and in fact the voivodeship is governed by the vice-voivode Jan Kołek, an energetic man, but at the same time very tactless in contacts with officials, introducing constant friction, which in turn was supposed to create an inflammatory atmosphere in the entire Branicki Palace. The newspaper's interventions caused Popielawski to send his deputy on leave and begin reforming the office, which won him the sympathy of the public.

On January 23, 1924, Voivode Popielawski suspended the publication of Dziennik Białostocki due to numerous lawsuits brought against its editor-in-chief Antoni Lubkiewicz for defamation. This event coincided with increasingly frequent articles criticizing the conduct of the Voivode and officials, as well as information about his imminent dismissal. On January 28, 1924, the Dziennik Białostocki published information that a delegation headed by the city president, Bolesław Szymański had gone to Warsaw to the president of the Republic of Poland, with a request to keep Popielawski in his position as governor. On July 12, 1924, Popielawski was suddenly summoned to Warsaw, where he was informed of the decision to remove him from the post. Dziennik Białostocki repeated the rumor at that time, which later turned out to be true, that Popielawski intended to resign from his job in the state administration. He died suddenly of a heart attack on December 16, 1934. He was buried in Warta.
