= Stanisław Michałowski =

Stefan Pasławski
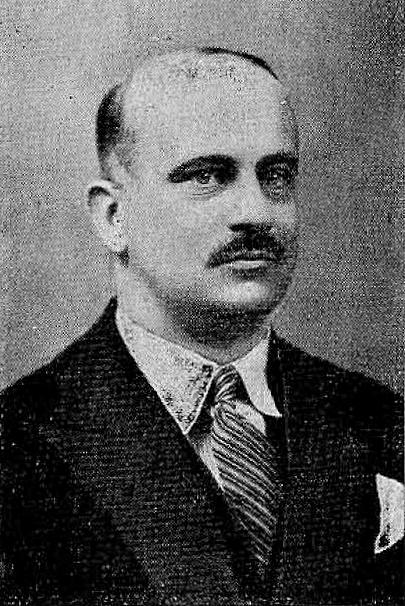

Voivode of Białystok Voivodeship (acting)
- In office 8 March 1934 – 29 September 1934
- Preceded by: Marian Zyndram-Kościałkowski
- Succeeded by: Stefan Pasławski

Personal details
- Born: May 3, 1881 Tarnopol
- Died: 1 June 1943 (aged 62) Warsaw
- Resting place: Powązki Cemetery
- Citizenship: Poland
- Education: University of Lwów
- Occupation: Politician
- Awards: Order of Polonia Restituta; Cross of Merit; Medal for Long Service; Cross of Merit (Austria-Hungary)
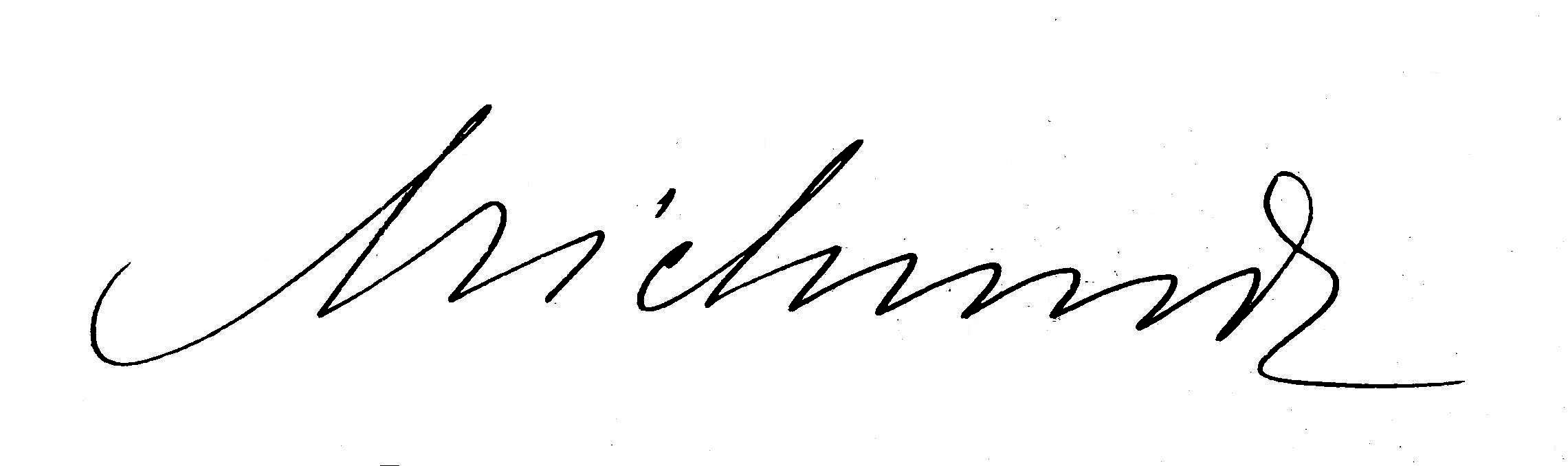
- Signature

Stanislaw Zygmunt Michałowski (3 May 1881 - 1 June 1943) was a Polish politician who served as the acting Voivode of Białystok Voivodeship.

== Biography ==
He was born on May 3, 1881 in Tarnopol. He was the son of Emil and Maria, née Pochorecka. He attended the male Imperial-Royal Higher Gymnasium in Tarnopol. He graduated from the law department of the University of Lviv. From 1915 he held the position of district commissioner of the Jaworów district office. According to the data from 1918 he worked in this office as secretary of the governor at the vacant office of the head of the district office. In the years 1918–1919 he was imprisoned by the Ukrainian authorities, released by the Polish Army. From 5 June 1919 he was the starosta of the Jaworów district, from 1925 he held the position of the starosta of the Sanok District, after which he was appointed from this position on 5 January 1929 the starosta of the Przemyśl district, he took office on 7 January 1929.

In 1932 Michalowski was appointed to the position of vice-voivde of Białystok Voivodeship by Bronisław Pieracki. He appeared in Białystok on June 20 of that year, probably quite unexpectedly, because the local press noted this fact only in a short note. In accordance with the regulations in force at that time, Michalowski headed the department of the voivodeship office, where matters concerning the organization of the voivodeship administration were conducted. Taking over the duties of the Białystok voivode in March 1934, Michałowski came at a good moment of the beginning of an improvement, after several years of deep crisis, of the economic situation in industry. In 1936, Michalowski reached retirement age, but continued to work until February 25, 1939. He died during the German occupation of Warsaw and was buried at the Powązki Cemetery.
