= Grodno district =

District of Grodno Region, Belarus

Grodno district Гродзенскі раён (Belarusian) Гродненский район (Russian)
- District
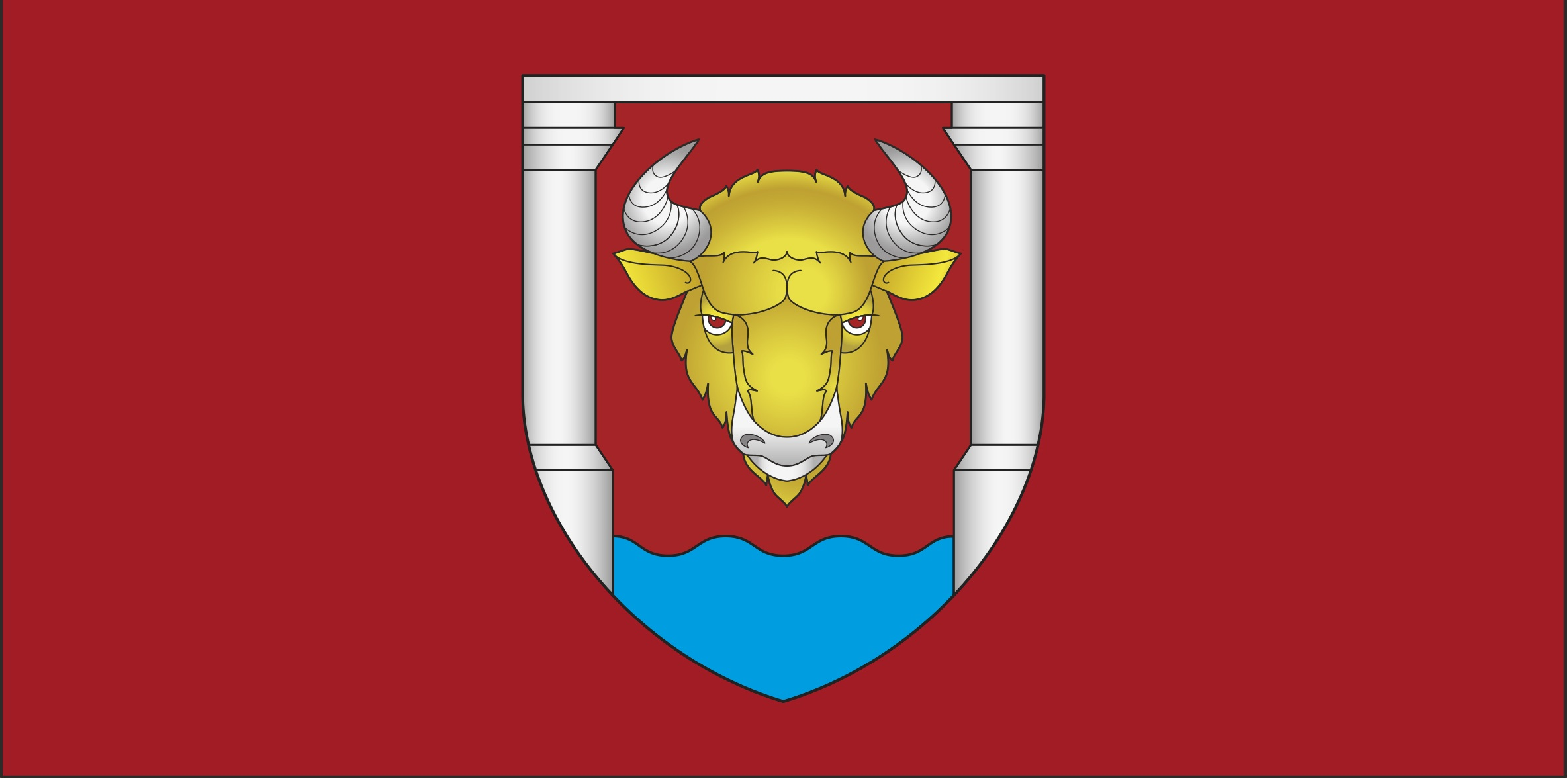
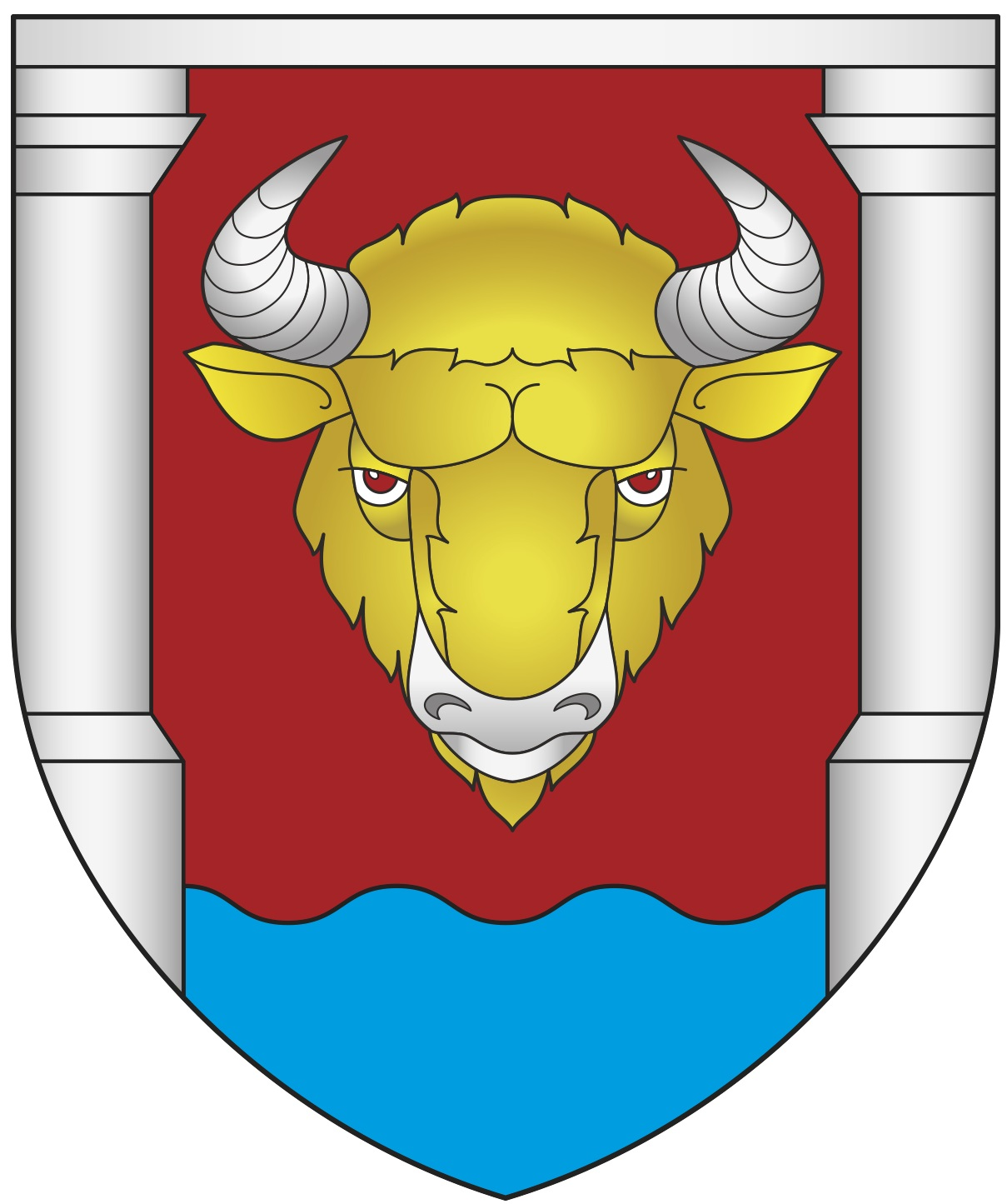
- Flag Coat of arms

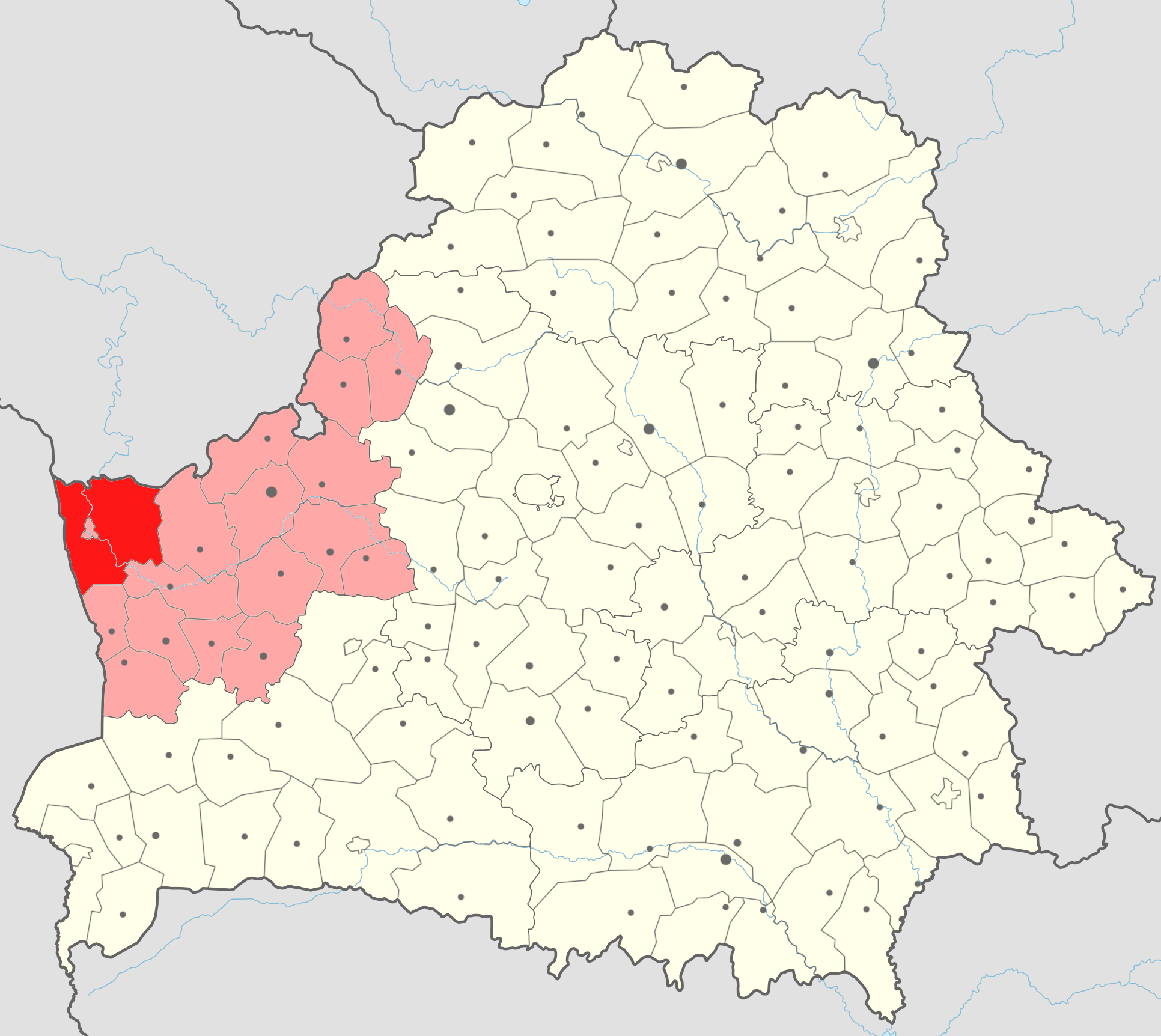
- Coordinates: 53°40′N 23°49′E
- Country: Belarus
- Region: Grodno region
- Administrative center: Grodno

Area
  - District: 2,594.05 km^{2} (1,001.57 sq mi)

Population (2024)
  - District: 48,494
  - Density: 18.694/km^{2} (48.418/sq mi)
  - Urban: 10,632
  - Rural: 37,862
- Time zone: UTC+3 (MSK)

Grodno district or Hrodna district (Belarusian: Гродзенскі раён; Russian: Гродненский район) is a district (raion) of Grodno region in Belarus. The administrative center is Grodno, which is administratively separated from the district. As of 2024, it has a population of 48,494.

== Notable residents ==
- Andżelika Borys (born 1973), Polish activist in Belarus
- Tadevuš Kandrusievič (born 1946, Adelsk), Belarusian prelate of the Catholic Church who served as Archbishop of Minsk–Mohilev from 2007 to 2021
- Makar Kraŭcoŭ (1891–1939), participant in the Belarusian independence movement, writer and a victim of Stalin's purges who authored the lyrics of "Vajacki marš" (a popular patriotic song)
