= Białystok Voivodeship (1919–1939) =

Former voivodeship of Poland

Białystok Voivodeship Województwo białostockie
- Voivodeship of Poland
- 1919–1939
- Coat of arms

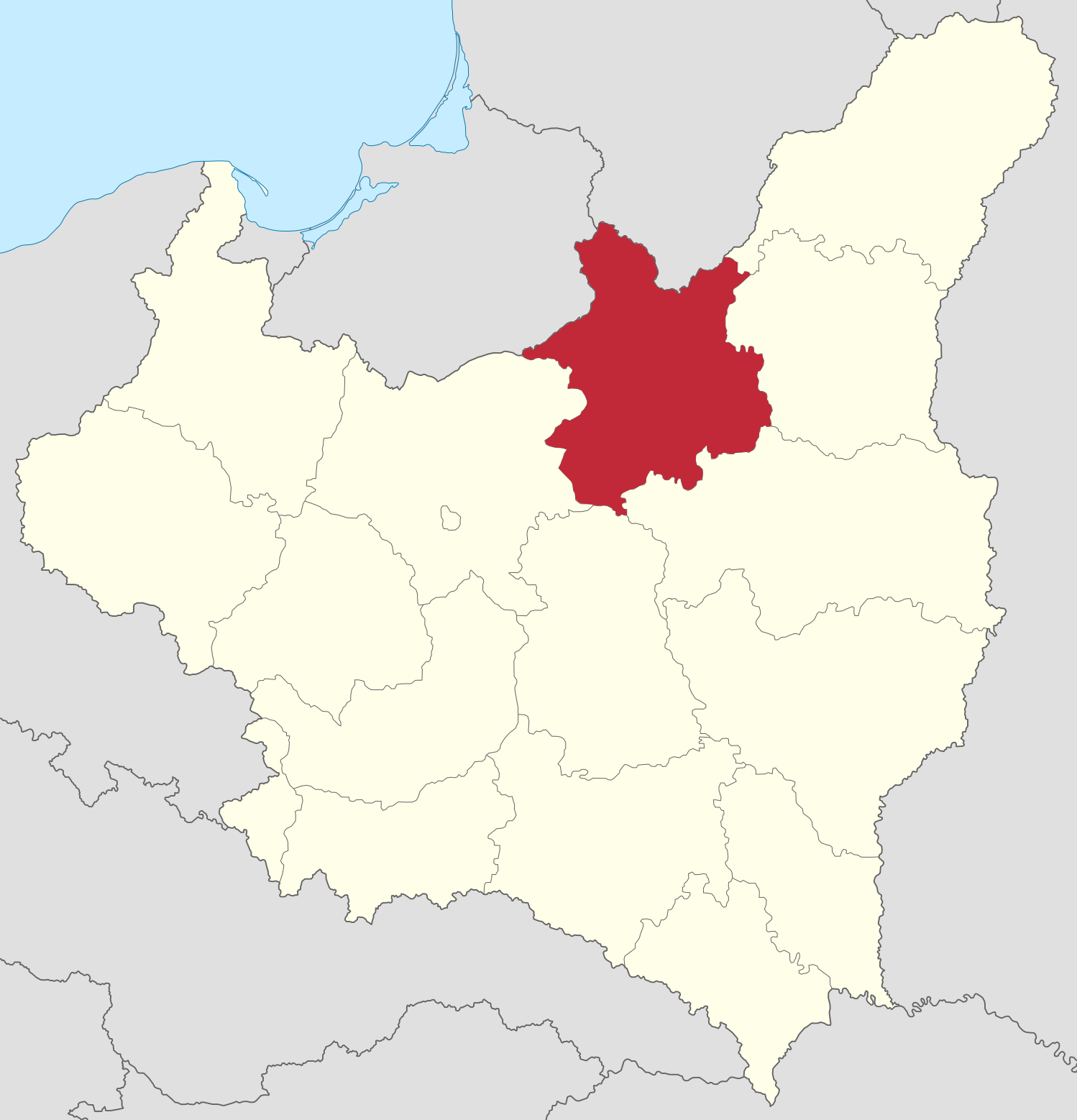
- Location of the Białystok Voivodeship (red) within the Second Polish Republic, 1938.
- Capital: Białystok
- Area
  - 1921: 32,450 km^{2} (12,530 sq mi)
  - 1939: 26,036 km^{2} (10,053 sq mi)
- Population
  - 1921: 1,305,284
  - 1931: 1,643,844
- Government
  - Type: Voivodeship
- Voivodes
  - 1919–1920: Stefan Bądzyński
  - 1937–1939: Henryk Ostaszewski
- Historical era: Interwar period
  - Established: 14 August 1919
  - Annexed: September 1939
- Political subdivisions: 13 counties (powiaty) (1919–38); 10 counties (1938–1939)
Preceded by
Bialystok-Grodno District
Succeeded by
Belastok Voblast
Province of East Prussia
Polish Underground State

Białystok Voivodeship (Polish: Województwo białostockie) was an administrative unit of interwar Poland (1918–1939). The province's capital and its biggest city was Białystok with a population of over 91,000 people. The voivodeship reached an area of 32,518 km2 and became the second largest voivodeship of the Second Polish Republic, after Polesie. Following the Nazi German and the Soviet invasion of Poland, the Voivodeship was occupied by both invading armies and divided according to Nazi-Soviet boundary treaty.

== History ==
The voivodeship was established in 1919 on the territory of Bialystok-Grodno District a German-occupied territory during and after the First World War from 1917 to 1921, and which prior to that was part of the Russian Empire, as Grodno Governorate.

On February 4, 1921, the voivodeship was expanded by three more counties: Grodno, Wołkowysk and Białowieża.

In 1928 a real threat of abolishing the Białystok Voivodeship emerged, when the Council of Ministers established the Commission for the Improvement of Administration, which began work on creating several large voivodeships in Poland. Under this project, most of the Białystok voivodeship was to be incorporated into the Wilno Voivodeship. News of this reached Białystok. At the initiative of Wincenty Hermanowski, a Citizens' Committee was established, which began a vigorous campaign to save the voivodeship. In 1932, a "memorial against the abolition of the Białystok voivodeship" was even created. Its authors were Michał Goławski, a well-known local expert and social activist, Konstanty Kosiński, a journalist and teacher and Jakub Szapiro, an Esperantist and journalist. However, regardless of this document, the authorities abandoned the planned administrative reform for financial reasons.

On September 1, 1939, with the Invasion of Poland by Nazi Germany, an order was also issued by the Białystok voivode Henryk Ostaszewski concerning the transfer of firearms and bladed weapons by residents to State Police stations and regulated the right to possess weapons. On September 7, all police units in the Białystok voivodeship received an order from the provincial commander, Deputy Inspector Kazimierz Ziołowski, to incorporate the police into the army. The State Police became part of the army as a security corps. As a result of the occupation of Poland, the country was divided between the Nazi Germany and the Soviet Union and with it all voivodeships were dissolved. The Białystok Voivodeship was first occupied and annexed to the Soviet Union, went through Sovietization process and in June 1941 occupied by Nazi Germany and annexed to East Prussia in 1941 as the Bialystok District.

== Politics ==
The seat of the Białystok Voivodeship Office became the Branicki Palace, occupied by the district court until 1920. Establishing the Voivodeship Office became the main task of the first Voivode Stefan Bądzyński. The Office could not start its work immediately and in the full scope of activities planned for it, because there was a lack of qualified officials; they were to arrive from Poland. Filling the positions took a relatively long time, among other things due to serious difficulties in finding suitable accommodation. Voivode Bądzyński himself had to stay for some time in the unheated Ritz Hotel at that time, before moving into one of the wings of the Branicki Palace. It was not until February 16, 1920, six months after the establishment of the Voivodeship, that the Voivodeship Office in Białystok began its work. In the first instance, even before the office was opened, the governor's task was to help local government authorities provide food for those in need, but as the situation changed, priorities changed - successive governors used various means to remedy the poor economic situation and the accompanying unemployment.

Successive voivodes also used broad powers to discipline the work of local governments, and if in their opinion they were working improperly, they decided to dismiss presidents and mayors, dissolve city and commune councils and order new elections. An autonomous part of the Communist Party of Western Belorussia operated in the voivodeship from 1923, striving for an armed coup and separation of the Kresy from Poland. Throughout the interwar period, the security services subordinated to the Voivode of Białystok fought these organizations, seeing them as a major threat. Of the minorities living in the voivodeship, the security services paid particular attention to the Belarusians and their irredential aspirations. The effects of the May Coup did not immediately affect the Białystok Voivodeship and voivode Marian Rembowski, appointed in August 1924, was dismissed from his position only in November 1927, despite the fact that he was one of the opponents of the coup. The beginning of the thirties was dominated by the political struggle between the Sanation camp and the opposition, as well as a deep economic crisis, the solution of which was beyond the reach of the voivodes. Nevertheless, they tried to at least mitigate the effects and counteract possible disturbances of order, which were frequent in those years.

From 10 July 1930 to the end of February 1934, Marian Zyndram-Kościałkowski was the Voivode of Białystok. During this time, he streamlined administration, increased supervision of officials, and prioritised the development of sewers and streets in Białystok. He also founded the Regional Committee for Unemployment, as well as had their share in the creation of the Agricultural Chamber of Białystok and ensuring the participation of entrepreneurs in the second Białystok Fair Vilnius. He was also one of the founders of Jagiellonia Białystok Sports Club (of which he was honorary president). Following the tenure of Zyndram-Kościałkowski, General Janusz Głuchowski, commander of the X Corps District, received an offer to take up the office of Voivode of Białystok. On July 3, 1934, president Mościcki signed the act of nomination, but the general did not accept it and did not come to Białystok and as a result Stefan Pasławski was chosen instead.

In the second half of the thirties, Polish-Jewish conflicts became more frequent. The voivodes of the region, obliged to act for the benefit of the state, sought to soothe disputes, justly punish perpetrators of incidents and exterminate manifestations of chauvinism. The last pre-war voivode, Henryk Ostaszewski, in correspondence with the Ministry of Internal Affairs, postulated the strengthening of Polishness in the area under his administration, for example by supporting the economic activity of Poles. At the same time, he criticized the state policy of the twenties for its too liberal attitude towards the cultural and political activity of Belarusians.

=== Political affiliation ===
The structures of political parties in the territories that became part of the Białystok Voivodeship began to emerge with the regaining of independence, and especially in connection with the preparations for the elections to the Legislative Sejm. The most frequent inspirations were party headquarters in Warsaw, sometimes the beginning was given by election committees, and later by newly elected deputies. This was facilitated by a very democratic electoral law: universal suffrage and the ease of submitting candidate lists (the support of 50 voters was enough). This was very important for the development of political life, although sometimes it led to bizarre situations, it happened that small villages or individual people submitted their own candidate lists. Very high voter turnout in the parliamentary elections in 1919–1930, which on a voivodeship scale always amounted to over 70%, despite calls from some political groups to boycott the elections. The highest turnout was recorded during the elections to the Legislative Sejm in 1919 (76.3%). High turnout was the result of enthusiasm for regaining independence, as well as propaganda campaigns in which the Catholic clergy played a major role. Low turnout was mainly the result of the volume of voters, the lack of candidates known to them.

The situation changed from 1935, when a new electoral law was passed, replacing party lists with First-past-the-post voting. In addition, there could only be two candidates for one seat, and the decisive influence on the selection of candidates in practice was held by the Sanation authorities, which blocked the path to the Sejm for representatives of opposition parties. For this reason, the opposition boycotted the elections in 1935 and 1938, although the actual scope of this boycott could have been even greater than indicated by the reported turnout, because the phenomenon of electoral abuses was spreading at that time, and some people deliberately cast invalid votes. The elections to the Legislative Sejm in 1919 ended with a decisive victory of only 22 out of 24 seats. Almost all of these 22 deputies initially joined the Sejm club of the National People's Union (the National Democracy). The two remaining mandates went to Franciszek Szymański, who ran on the PSL "Wyzwolenie" list, and the candidate in the Białystok district on the Orthodox-Zionist Mizrachi list, merchant Joszua Farbstein. The star among the deputies elected in 1919 was undoubtedly Father Kazimierz Lutosławski, a close associate of Roman Dmowski, who came from Drozdowo near Łomża.

Starting with the elections in 1922, there were 18 parliamentary mandates up for grabs in the voivodeship in four slightly changed constituencies. The results of these elections gave a more diversified picture of the political composition of the province. The dominance of right-wing groups was no longer as clear, although the Christian Union of National Unity lists won 11 mandates. The Christian Democratic groups won five seats, the Bloc of National Minorities won four (of which three were Belarusians and one Jew), and the PSL "Piast" won two. The May Coup in 1926 and Piłsudski's return to power caused a temporary increase in the influence of left-wing groups and a decrease in the popularity of the right. Despite the pressure from the Sanation camp, by the end of the thirties the three largest opposition parties still had quite a strong influence: the National Party in the western part of the province, the People's Party in the northern part (Suwałki Region) and the Polish Socialist Party in larger cities, Białystok, Bielsk Podlaski and Grodno.

=== Voivodes ===
- Stefan Bądzyński, 19 November 1919 – 18 October 1920
- Stefan Popielawski, September 1920 – 12 July 1924 (till 3 November 1920 – acting)
- Marian Rembowski, 12 August 1924 – 24 November 1927
- Karol Kirst, 24 November 1927 – 10 July 1930
- Marian Zyndram-Kościałkowski, 10 July 1930 – 8 March 1934
- Stanisław Michałowski, 8 March 1934 – 29 September 1934 (acting)
- Stefan Pasławski, 29 September 1934 – 14 July 1936
- Stefan Kirtiklis, 17 July 1936 – 9 September 1937
- Henryk Ostaszewski, 9 November 1937 – 10 September 1939 (till 22 December 1937 acting)

== Geography ==
In interwar Poland (1918–1939), Białystok Voivodeship was located in the country's mid-northern part. It bordered Germany (East Prussia) to the north-west, Lithuania to the north-east, Wilno Voivodeship and Nowogródek Voivodeship to the east, Polesie Voivodeship and Lublin Voivodeship to the south and Warsaw Voivodeship to the west. Its area was 26 036 km^{2}. The landscape was flat, with the mighty Bialowieza Forest located right in the middle.

== Administrative divisions ==
=== 1919–1938 ===
- Augustów County
- Białystok
- Białystok County
- Bielsk County
- Grodno County
- Łomża County
- Ostrołęka County
- Ostrów Mazowiecka County
- Sokółka County
- Suwałki County
- Szczuczyn County
- Wołkowysk County
- Wysokie Mazowieckie County
- Białowieża County (4 February 1921 to 31 July 1922)

=== 1938–1939 ===
After 1 April 1938, the Voivodeship consisted of ten counties:

- Augustow County (area 2 035 km^{2}, pop. 74 800)
- Białystok (area 39 km^{2}, pop. 91 100)
- Białystok County (area 3 079 km^{2}, pop. 140 100)
- Bielsk County (area 4 989 km^{2}, pop. 204 500)
- Grodno County (area 4 459 km^{2}, pop. 213 100)
- Sokolka County (area 2 333 km^{2}, pop. 103 100)
- Suwalki County (area 2 246 km^{2}, pop. 110 100)
- Szczuczyn County (area 1 451 km^{2}, pop. 68 200)
- Wolkowysk County (area 3 938 km^{2}, pop. 171 300)
- Wysokie Mazowieckie County (area 1 467 km^{2}, pop. 87 000)

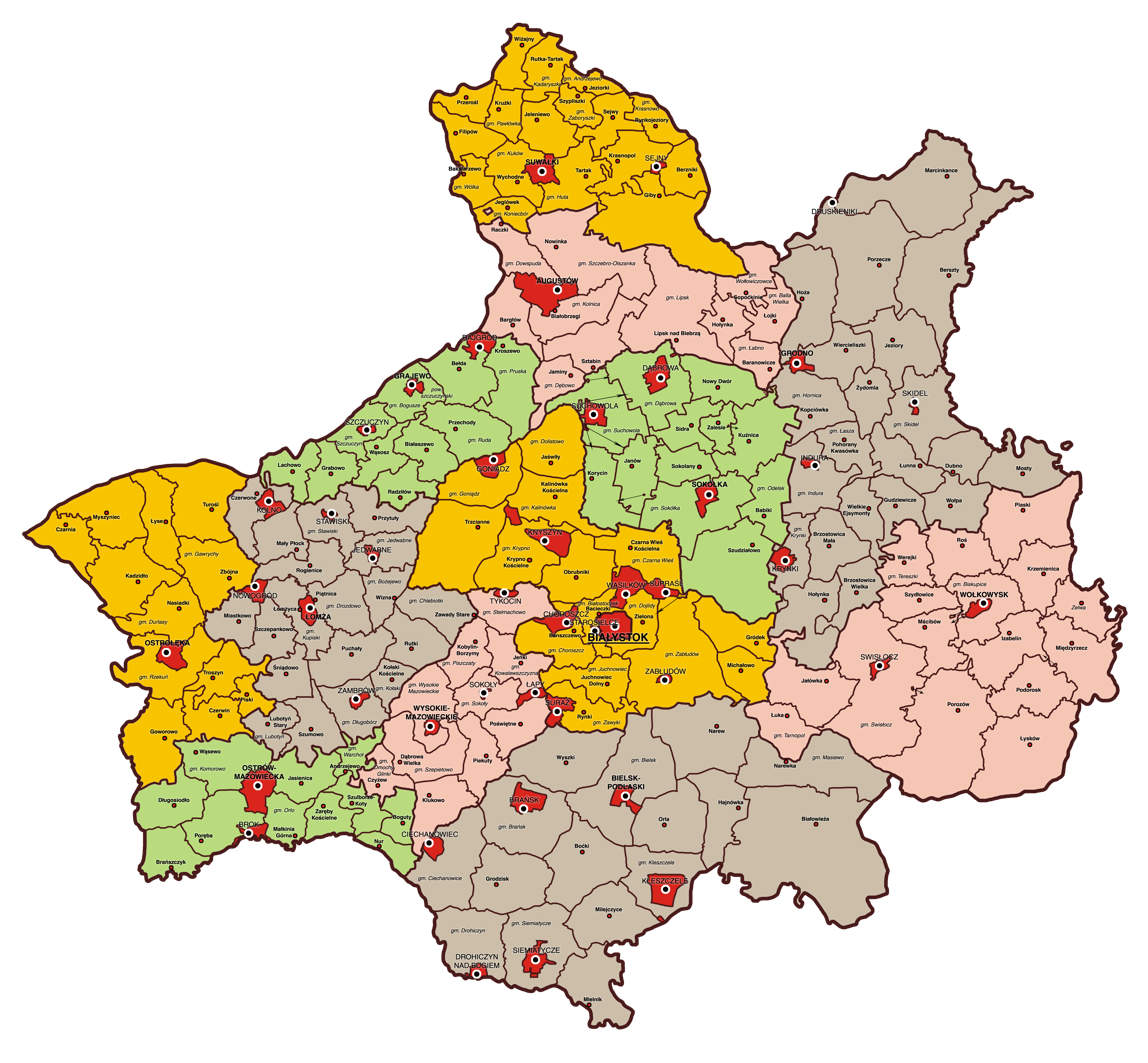
Administrative division of Bialystok Voivodeship, 1938.

== Cities and towns ==
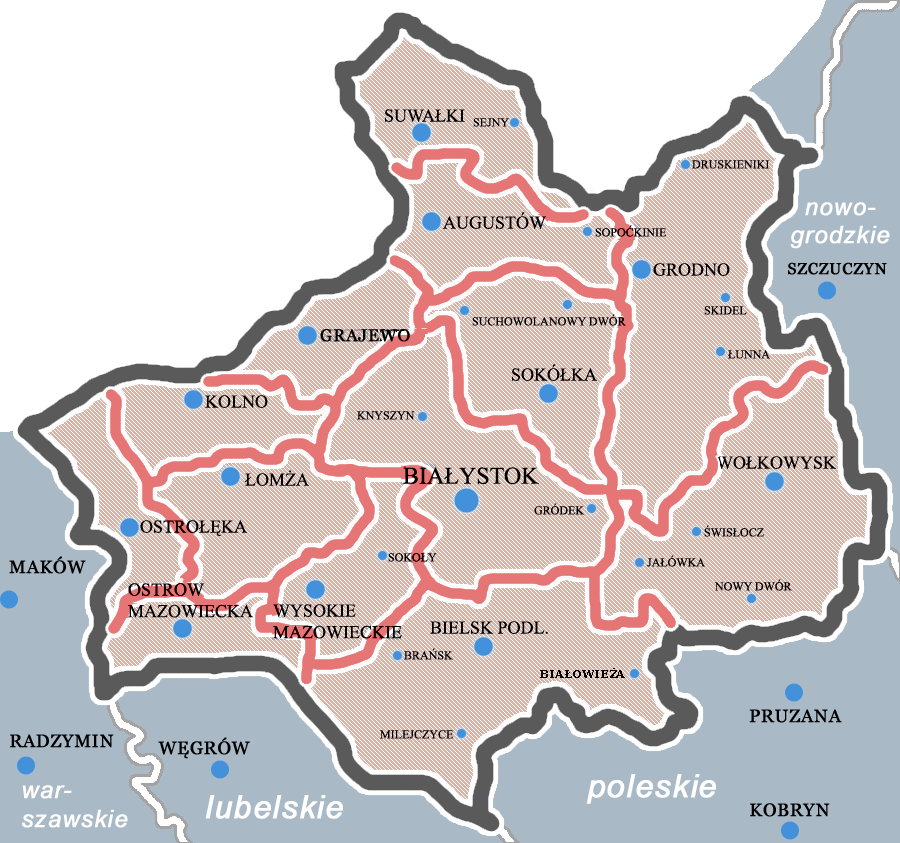
Counties of the Białystok Voivodeship from 1919 to 1921 and 1922–1939.

The Voivodeship consisted of thirteen counties (powiaty):

According to the 1931 census, the most significant cities were:

- Białystok (pop. 91 100),
- Grodno (pop. 49 700),
- Suwałki (pop. 21 800),
- Wolkowysk (pop. 15 100),
- Augustow (pop. 12 100).

== Economy ==
In the interwar period, Białystok Voivodeship was part of the so-called "Poland B". The voivodeship was relatively underdeveloped, with 23.1% of the population being illiterate. Railroad networks were scarce (total length 1 377 km., density – 4.2 per 100 km^{2}), and forested areas covered 24.4% of Voivodeship's area. The city of Białystok (whose population reached 107 000 in 1939), was the Voivodeship's lone industrial centre. Agriculture was at a low level.

In the first years to Poland's independence and the existence, the voivodeship suffered from deep economic and social problems. The bovine pneumonia that spread across the province at the end of 1923 proved to be particularly dangerous. At that time, epidemics of infectious diseases were also dangerous, severely affecting the inhabitants of the province weakened by the effects of war. A District Reconstruction Council was established, led by voivode Stefan Popielawski, whose main goal was to collect funds and encourage society to actively and professionally participate in the reconstruction of the voivodeship, which had been destroyed by six years of war. Unemployment was particularly felt at the end of 1923. Just before Christmas, around 2,000 workers were dismissed because the Polish National Loan Fund would not grant loans to the voivodeship's factories, mostly concentrated in Białystok. While the voivodeship office took action to find funds to reopen the factories, it had little affect. The second wave of unemployment in the region occurred in mid-May 1924. The deepening economic crisis led to mass dismissals of workers, and those who managed to keep their jobs had their wages cut and were forced to work more hours.

=== Agriculture ===
Agriculture in the Białystok Voivodeship entered the interwar period not only with the destruction of the war years, much greater than in the western or central provinces, but also with delays in development characteristic of the lands that had previously been part of the Russian Empire. The result of lower agricultural culture was lower productivity of local agriculture. The structure of farms in the province was quite good compared to the rest of the country. There were definitely fewer dwarf farms (up to 2 ha) - only 15.3%, and there were also fewer small-scale peasants (farms 2-5 ha) - 25.8%. Farms in the voivodeship were dominated by farms in the 5-20 ha range (53.2%).

The land parcelling campaign (by 1931, 79,000 ha had been allocated for the purposes of the agrarian reform), as well as obtaining compensation for the liquidation of easements, influenced the improvement of the structure of farms, especially the decrease in the percentage of dwarf farms to 8% of the total in 1931. Unfortunately, the percentage of small farms (2-5 ha) increased to 29%, which was mainly a consequence of the lack of possibility of the outflow of labour from the countryside to the cities. In parallel with the land parcelling campaign, other actions were carried out to reconstruct the agricultural system: land improvement (in the years 1927–1936, an area of over 38,000 ha was improved) and consolidation (in 1938 alone, 11,300 farms were consolidated). The authorities supported the organisation of agricultural and breeding competitions, agricultural training activities and the creation of specialist facilities.

== Demographics ==
Inhabited mostly by Poles (in 1931 they made up 66.9% of the population), it also had significant Belarusian (16.3%) and Jewish (12.1%) minorities.

In 1921, 1,307,000 people lived in the Białystok Voivodeship, and ten years later, 1,644,000. The faster rate of population growth was primarily a consequence of the dominance of repatriation over emigration, which was still ongoing at the beginning of the 1920s. During the first census, conducted in 1921, 68.5% identified themselves as Catholics, 15.1% as Orthodox (197,000), and 14.9% as followers of Judaism (194,000). However, the process of returning to the family homes of the Orthodox, who had been torn away by the wave of Bieżeństwo in 1915, was not yet complete. Therefore, in the next census, conducted in 1931, the percentage of people of Orthodox faith increased to 18.5%. At that time, religion was something more permanent than a sense of national consciousness, which in the case of quite significant groups of the population was only just emerging. In the conditions of the Polonization policy, some of them acquired Polish national consciousness. Belarusians constituted the largest percentage of the population in the counties of Wołkowysk (42%), Grodno (30%) and Bielsk (29%), and they predominated among the rural population in the first two counties and in the eastern part of the third. As much as 97% of the Belarusian population lived in the countryside and was mainly engaged in agriculture. The countryside, especially in the eastern counties, was in a very difficult economic situation, hence its susceptibility to various revolutionary slogans. However, Belarusians were ready to support any party that promised them land (agrarian reform) and schooling in their native language. A little over 2% (35,148) of the inhabitants of Białystok Voivodeship in 1931 considered Russian to be their native language, which means that they were Russians. However it might be that some Belarusians also declared Russian. A special group among the Russians were the Old Believers, who lived almost exclusively in the Suwałki and Augustów counties, and their number in 1931 must be estimated at 6-7 thousand.

According to Polish data from April 1939, the population of Białystok voivodship was divided as follows: 71,1% Poles, 13,5% Belarusians, 11,9% Jews, 2,2% Russians, 0,9% Lithuanians, 0,5% Germans.

=== 1931 census ===
The results of the 1931 census (questions about mother tongue and about religion) are presented in the table below:

Counties with Orthodox/Greek Catholic plurality are highlighted with yellow.

Linguistic (mother tongue) and religious structure of the Białystok Voivodeship according to the 1931 census
Today part of	County	Pop.	Polish	Belarusian & Russian	Lithuanian	Yiddish & Hebrew	Other language	Roman Catholic	Orthodox & Uniate	Jewish	Other religion
(Poland)	Augustów	74751	91.9%	2.1%	0.0%	5.7%	0.3%	90.7%	1.2%	5.7%	2.4%
(Poland)	Białystok City	91101	50.9%	4.2%	0.0%	42.6%	2.3%	45.5%	8.4%	43.0%	3.1%
(Poland)	Białystok County	140078	83.3%	8.2%	0.0%	7.8%	0.7%	75.4%	15.7%	7.9%	1.0%
(Poland)	Bielsk Podlaski	202410	55.0%	34.8%	0.0%	9.0%	1.2%	45.1%	45.3%	9.1%	0.5%
(Belarus) (Lithuania)	Grodno	213105	47.4%	32.8%	2.9%	16.6%	0.3%	41.8%	40.9%	16.7%	0.6%
(Poland)	Łomża	168167	87.0%	0.1%	0.0%	12.6%	0.3%	86.4%	0.2%	12.8%	0.6%
(Poland)	Ostrołęka	112587	92.7%	0.0%	0.0%	7.1%	0.2%	92.3%	0.1%	7.2%	0.4%
(Poland)	Ostrów	99741	86.1%	0.1%	0.0%	12.3%	1.5%	85.8%	0.2%	12.4%	1.6%
(Poland)	Sokółka	103135	90.0%	2.0%	0.0%	7.9%	0.1%	78.6%	12.9%	8.3%	0.2%
(Poland)	Suwałki	110124	77.8%	5.7%	6.2%	7.3%	3.0%	79.3%	1.4%	7.4%	11.9%
(Poland)	Szczuczyn	68215	89.3%	0.2%	0.0%	10.1%	0.4%	89.1%	0.3%	10.2%	0.4%
(Belarus)	Volkovysk	171327	48.5%	43.7%	0.0%	7.6%	0.2%	44.6%	47.1%	7.8%	0.5%
(Poland)	Wysokie Mazowieckie	89103	88.5%	0.2%	0.0%	11.0%	0.3%	88.2%	0.4%	11.1%	0.3%
Total	Białystok Voivodeship	1643844	71.9%	14.6%	0.8%	11.9%	0.8%	67.8%	18.6%	12.0%	1.6%

== See also ==
- Białystok Voivodeship (1944–1975)
- Białystok Voivodeship (1975–1998)
- Podlaskie Voivodeship (1999–present)
