= Central Lithuanian offensive of November 1920 =

Offensive of the Republic of Central Lithuania on Lithuania in 1920

Central Lithuanian Offensive on Kaunas
- Part of Polish–Lithuanian War
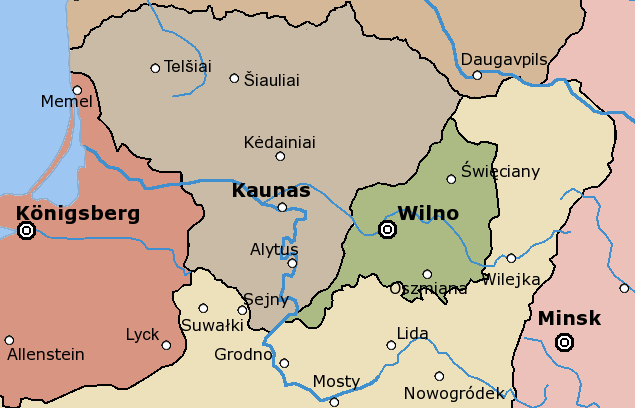
- Borders of Lithuania and Central Lithuania in 1920.
Date	November 1920
Location	Vilnius Region, Kaunas Region
Result	Status quo; Signing of the Treaty of Kaunas; Establishment of the Polish–Lithuanian Neutral Strip

Belligerents
Central Lithuania	Lithuania

Commanders and leaders
Lucjan Żeligowski	Silvestras Žukauskas; Kazys Ladyga

Strength
Central Lithuania 20,000	Lithuania 10,000–15,000

Casualties and losses
200–300	300–400

The Central Lithuanian offensive of November 1920 was a military offensive of the Republic of Central Lithuania, led by General Lucjan Żeligowski, on the territories of Lithuania, that took place in November of 1920.

== Offensive ==
On 12 October 1920, soldiers of Second Polish Republic, led by General Lucjan Żeligowski, attacked Lithuania in an event known as Żeligowski's Mutiny. Following this, the eastern part of the country was separated, forming the Republic of Central Lithuania, a puppet state of Poland. In the second half of November, the Army of Central Lithuania, led by Żeligowski, attacked Lithuania, heading to Kaunas. Following the attack, it occupied the towns of Lentvaris, Trakai, Rykantai, Didžioji Riešė and Nemenčinė. The Lithuanian 3rd Infantry Division launched a counterattack on 18 November. After it failed, Lithuanian forces had retreated.

After that, the Central Lithuanian army advanced to Vievis, Širvintos and Giedraičiai. At that time, the staff of the 1st Infantry Division was captured. Volunteers from Poland joined the Żeligowski's army, though many of them were left without proper arms. Following that, General Żeligowski proposed peace negotiations, but Lithuania refused. After that, Żeligowski's army continued advancing towards Videniškiai, Želva and Lyduokiai. Lithuania managed to stop his forces.

The next operation started in the second half of November and aimed to capture Kaunas. Central Lithuanian forced headed towards the city and on 21 November 1920 stopped on the Nevėžis river near Kėdainiai, 50 km (31 miles) from Kaunas. Due to lack of personnel and arms, the infantry being left behind the cavalry and Poland pressing for a truce, under the international pressure, both sides signed as truce on that day. Negotiation in Kaunas, led by League of Nations, led to the signing of the Treaty of Kaunas, with an armistice taking effect on 30 November.

== Aftermath ==
Following the signing of treaty of Kaunas, both sides stopped fighting and exchanged prisoners of war. The League of Nations established a demilitarised zone, the Polish–Lithuanian Neutral Strip, on the border of Lithuania and Central Lithuania, which lasted from 17 December 1920 to 22 May 1923. Additionally, the League of Nations started preparing a plebiscite in Vilnius Region, which was meant to define whether the local population preferred to be a part of Lithuania or Central Lithuania (and later Poland), but it never happened.

== Citations ==
=== Bibliography ===
- Allcock, John B. (1992). Border and territorial disputes. Gale Group.
- Łach, Wiesław Bolesław (2014). „Bunt” Żeligowskiego: Kulisy przyłączenia Wileńszczyzny do Polski 1920–1922 (in Polish). Warsaw: Bellona. ISBN 978-83-11-13198-9.
- Wyszczelski, Lech (2008). Wilno 1919–1920 (in Polish). Warsaw: Bellona.
