= Treaty of Kaunas =

1920 treaty that ended the Central Lithuanian Offensive on Kaunas

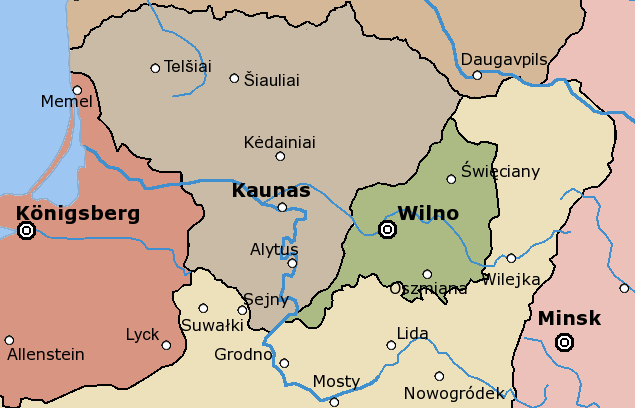
- Borders of Lithuania and Central Lithuania in 1920.
- Context: Armistice between Lithuania and Central Lithuania ending Central Lithuanian Offensive on Kaunas
- Drafted: 27–29 November 1920
- Signed: 29 November 1920
- Location: Kaunas, Lithuania
- Effective: 30 November 1920
- Negotiators: Michel Kossakowski
- Signatories: Lithuania; Poland; League of Nations
- Parties: Lithuania; Poland; Central Lithuania
- Languages: Polish, Lithuanian, French

Treaty of Kaunas (Note: Lithuanian: Kauno paliaubos; Polish: Traktat w Kownie) was a treaty signed on 29 November 1920 in Kaunas, Lithuania, that the next day started the armistice between Lithuania and Central Lithuania ending the Central Lithuanian Offensive on Kaunas. The treaty was drafted between 27 and 29 November 1920, during the peace negotiations between Lithuania and Poland led by the League of Nations.

== Context ==
On 12 October 1920, soldiers of Second Polish Republic, led by general Lucjan Żeligowski, attacked Lithuania, in an event known as Żeligowski's Mutiny. Following this, the eastern part of the country was separated, forming Republic of Central Lithuania, a puppet state of Poland. In the second half of November, Army of Central Lithuania, led by Żeligowski, attacked Lithuania, heading to the city of Kaunas. By 21 November 1920, Central Lithuanian forced got to the line of the Nevėžis river near Kėdainiai, 50 km (31 miles) from Kaunas. Due to lack of people and armament, infantry being left behind the cavalry and Poland pressing for a truce, under the international pressure, both sites had signed the truce on that day. The peace negotiation between Lithuania and Poland, in Kaunas, led by League of Nations, led to the signing of the peace treaty and officially started the armistice on 30 November 1920. Michel Kossakowski, representative of the Polish government in with the Military Commission of Control of the League of Nations had signed the treaty on the behalf of Poland.

== The treaty ==
Following the signing of the treaty, both sides stopped fighting the next day on 30 November and exchanged the prisoners of war. League of Nations had established the demilitarised zone of Polish–Lithuanian Neutral Strip that was formed on the border of Lithuania and Central Lithuania (the last one being later incorporated into Poland), and existed from 17 December 1920 to 22 May 1923. Lucjan Żeligowski, head of state of Central Lithuania, had agreed to abide by the treaty while Poland had agreed to observe actions of Żeligowski to ensure that.

Additionally, the League of Nations started preparing the plebiscite in Vilnius Region, which was meant to define whether the local population preferred to be a part of Lithuania or Central Lithuania (and later Poland), however, it never happened.

On 1 March 1922, the treaty got documented in French language in the Secretariat of the League of Nations, following Article 18 of the Treaty of Versailles.

== Bibliography ==
- Łach, Wiesław Bolesław (2014). „Bunt” Żeligowskiego: Kulisy przyłączenia Wileńszczyzny do Polski 1920–1922 (in Polish). Warsaw: Bellona. ISBN 978-83-11-13198-9.
- Wyszczelski, Lech (2008). Wilno 1919–1920 (in Polish). Warsaw: Bellona.
