= Cross of Merit of the Army of Central Lithuania =

Cross of Military Merit of Central Lithuania
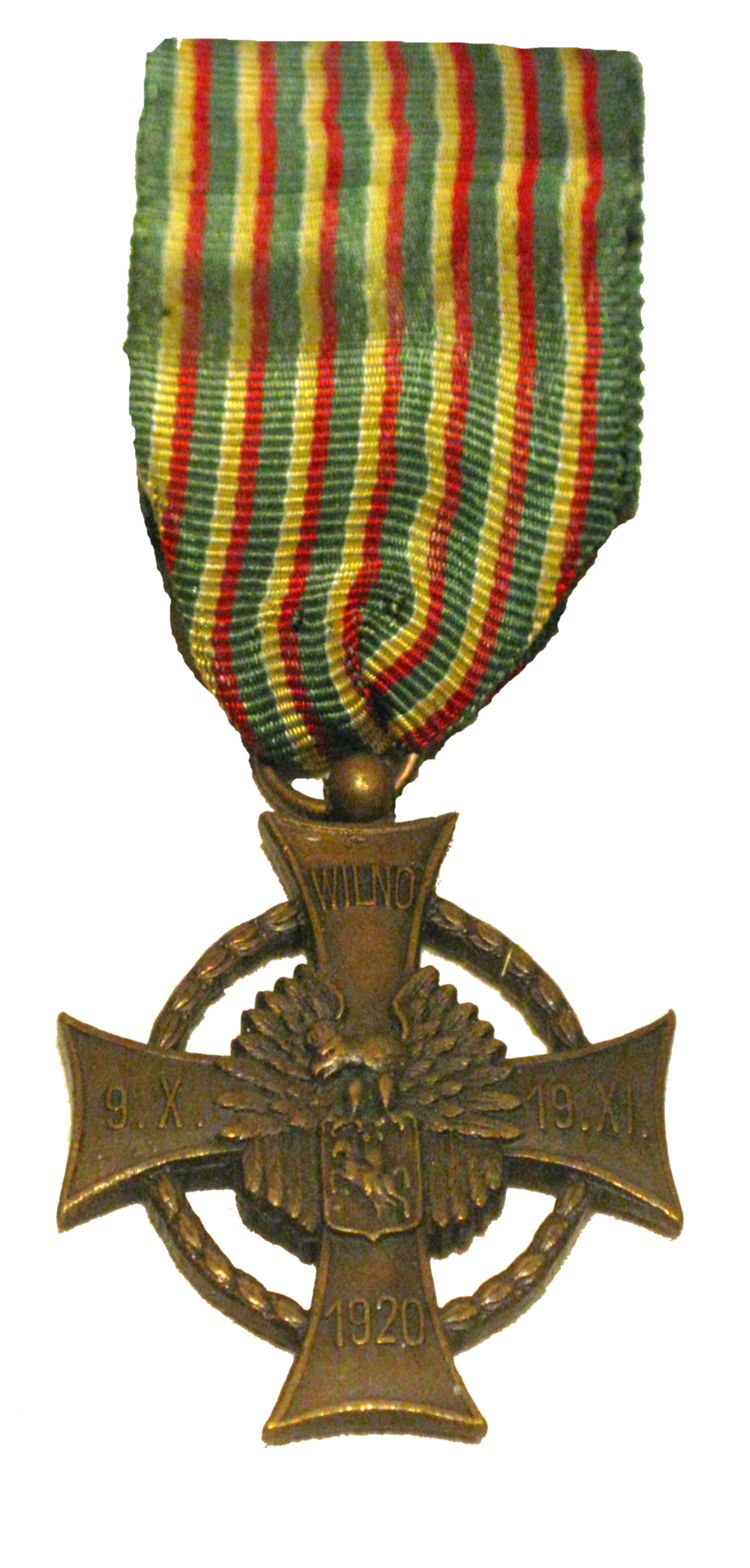
- Cross of Military Merit of Central Lithuania
- Established: 1922
- Country: Republic of Central Lithuania (1922); Second Polish Republic (1922–1926)
- Status: discontinued in 1926

Statistics
- Total inductees: 1439

Precedence
- Next (higher): Volunteer Cross for War; Cross of Merit
- Next (lower): Cross on Silesian Ribbon of Valor and Merit
- The ribbon bar of the Order

The Cross of Merit of the Army of Central Lithuania (Note: Polish: Krzyż Zasługi Wojsk Litwy Środkowej) was a military order of merit awarded by the Republic of Central Lithuania in 1922, and by the Second Polish Republic, from 1922 to 1926. It was awarded to the soldiers of the Polish Armed Forces, and the Army of Central Lithuania, in recognition of merit, expressed by the soldiers during the war Polish–Lithuanian War, from 9 October to 19 November 1920, which included the Żeligowski's Mutiny, and the Central Lithuanian Offensive on Kaunas.

== History ==
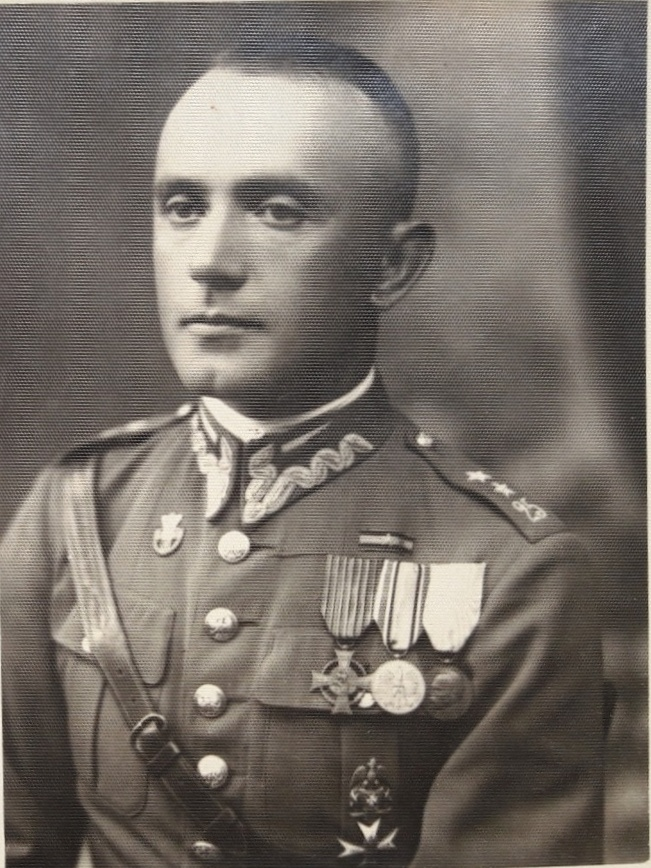
Stanisław Bazylczuk, soldier of the Polish Land Forces, wearing the Cross of Merit of the Army of Central Lithuania (first to the left) in 1934.

The order was established on 25 February 1922 in the resolution of the Sejm of Central Lithuania of the Republic of Central Lithuania, and approved on 27 March 1922, by the Provisional Governing Commission. The order was awarded to the soldiers of the Polish Armed Forces, and the Army of Central Lithuania, in recognition of merit, expressed by the soldiers during the war Polish–Lithuanian War, from 9 October to 19 November 1920, which included the Żeligowski's Mutiny, and the Central Lithuanian Offensive on Kaunas. The order was originally awarded by the Provisional Governing Commission of Central Lithuania, on the recommendation from the formation commanders. Following the incorporation of Central Lithuania into Second Polish Republic, the order was awarded by the special committee. The last order was awarded in 1926. On 3 March 1926 the Ministry of Military Matters had published the list of people awarded the order. The second list, that stated the updated list of people that were allowed to receive and wear the order, was published on 11 November 1931. In total, the order was awarded to 1439 people.

== Description ==
The order is made from bronze. It consists of the cross pattée with the dimensions of 43 x 43 mm. The arms of the cross, on the obverse side, featured, clockwise from the top, was placed text that read: "WILNO", "9 X", "19 XI", and "1920", refencing to the city of Vilnius, known in Polish as Wilno, the capital of the Republic of Central Lithuania, and the dates 9 October and 19 November 1920 year. In the centre of the cross was placed an eagle holding the coat of arms of Lithuania in its arms. The coat of arms features a knight with a sword raised in its right hand, sitting on a horse standing on its back legs. Around the centre of the order, between the arms of the cross, was a ring laurel wreath. The reverse side of the cross features texts on its right and left arms, that read "LITWA", and "ŚRODKOWA", respectively. When read from left to right, it formed "Litwa Środkowa", which translates in Polish to "Central Lithuania". It also featured two swords, each placed on each of the vertical arms, and a round shield in the centre of the cross.

The cross was hang on a ribbon that was 37 mm wide, and consisted of seven yellow and red horizontal stripes, each with wight of 2 mm, and separated by green stripes with a wight of 3 mm.

The order was worn after the Volunteer Cross for War and the Cross of Merit, and before the Cross on Silesian Ribbon of Valor and Merit.
