= Polish–Lithuanian Neutral Strip =

Demilitarised zone, 1920 to 1923

- Lithuania–Poland border

Site information
- Type: Demilitarised zone
- Open to the public: Yes
- Condition: Military presence forbidden

Location
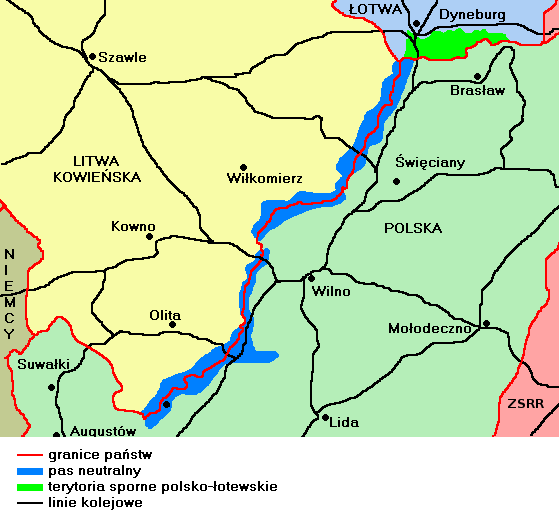
- The Neutral Strip between borders of Lithuania and Poland.

Site history
- Built by: Lithuania; Poland; League of Nations
- In use: 17 December 1920–22 May 1923
- Events: Żeligowski's Mutiny, Central Lithuanian Offensive on Kaunas, Treaty of Kaunas

Polish–Lithuanian Neutral Strip (Note: Polish: Pas neutralny polsko-litewski) was a demilitarised zone between Lithuania and Republic of Central Lithuania, and later Poland, that was established on 17 December 1920, following the treaty of Kaunas and disestablished on 22 May 1923. It was established by the League of Nations, to stop countries from fighting, following the Central Lithuanian Offensive on Kaunas. The zone was located on the borders of the separated countries between towns of Pabradė and Valkininkai and was, on average, 6 km wide on each side of the border.

== History ==
It was a demilitarised zone, with the presence of the military forces and installations forbidden within its area. The entrance to the zone had only police forces, that however failed to keep the order within it. The zone was dominated by Polish-speaking population. In the area was organised the propaganda operation targeted to Polish-speakers, as the League of Nations were preparing the plebiscite that would determine whether the population of Vilnius Region wanted to live in Lithuania and Poland. The plebiscite however had never happened. In the zone operated various Lithuanian and Polish militias. Lithuanian militias organized attacks on Polish-speaking inhabitants, including attacks on 24 April 1922 and 5 January 23. Following the attacks, Poland demanded the abolition of the zone.

On the southernmost Lithuanian part of the zone operated the self-proclaimed Warwiszki Government, a resistance movement operating in Varviškė and neighboring villages, formed on 20 February 1920 as self-defense forces of the local Polish-speaking inhabitants from attacks of Lithuanian militias. The body eventually started acting as a rebel state fighting against the Lithuanian rule of the region and aiming to the preservation of Polish governance in the region and possible reunification with Poland. During its existence, Lithuanian militias backed by the army and police attempted several times to dissolve the local government. The self-proclaimed state was eventually dissolved on 22 May 1923, after the Lithuanian army attacked and raided the villages of Varviškė, Świętojańsk and Bugieda.

The fights in the neutral zone had affected vies of the local population on their national identity. While before that, a huge portion of local Polish-speakers identified themselves as Lithuanians, in the meaning of inhabitants of Lithuania, after the events, the population had shifted to identify themselves as either Poles or Lithuanians, as members of the ethnic groups.

== See also ==
- Lithuania–Poland border
