= Coat of arms of Central Lithuania =

Polish-Lithuanian coat of arms

- Armiger: Lucjan Żeligowski, Leader of Central Lithuania
- Adopted: 12 October 1920
- Shield: red with silver (white) edge
- Compartment: Silver (white) eagle and silver (white) Vytis (a knight on a horse)
- Use: Republic of Central Lithuania

The coat of arms of the Republic of Central Lithuania, an unrecognized short-lived puppet republic of Poland, was established on 12 October 1920 and remained in use until 18 April 1922, when the state ceased to exist.

== Design ==
The coat of arms was officially defined as an eagle and Pahonia (a knight on a horse) in the escutcheon. It consists of 2 charges set next to each other. On the right is a silver (white) eagle wearing a crown, and on the left, a silver (white) Pahonia, a charge, that consists of a knight with a sword in his right hand, and a shield with the Cross of Lorraine in his left hand, that is sitting on a jumping horse. Both charges are placed within the red escutcheon with a silver (white) edge. Its design referred to the coat of arms used by the Polish National Government during the November Uprising, in 1831.

== History ==
The coat of arms was established as the symbol of the state, on 12 November 1920, in the Decree No. 1 of the Chief-in-command of the Army of Central Lithuania. The coat of arms stopped being used after the Republic of Central Lithuania was incorporated into Poland on 18 April 1922.

== Gallery ==
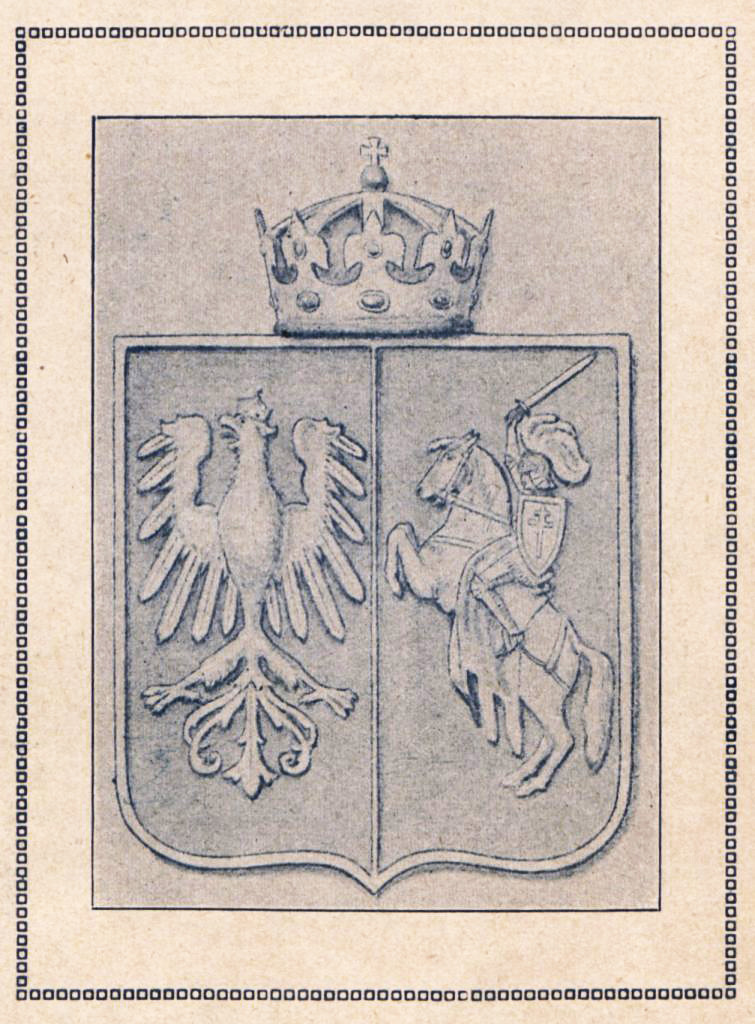
A drawing of the coat of arms from 1920.

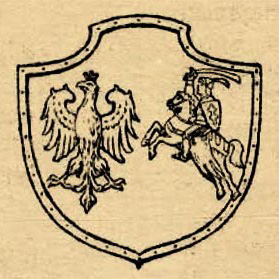
The coat of arms from the Decree No. 1 of the Chief-in-command of the Army of Central Lithuania from 1920.

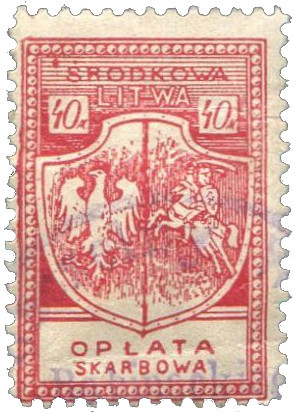
The coat of arms from 1920 revenue stamp.

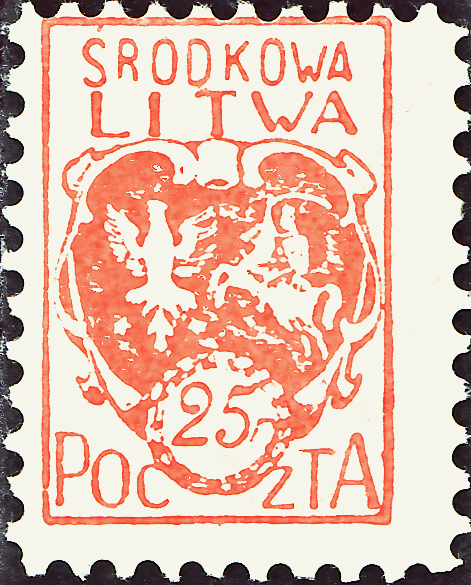
The coat of arms from 1920 postal stamp.

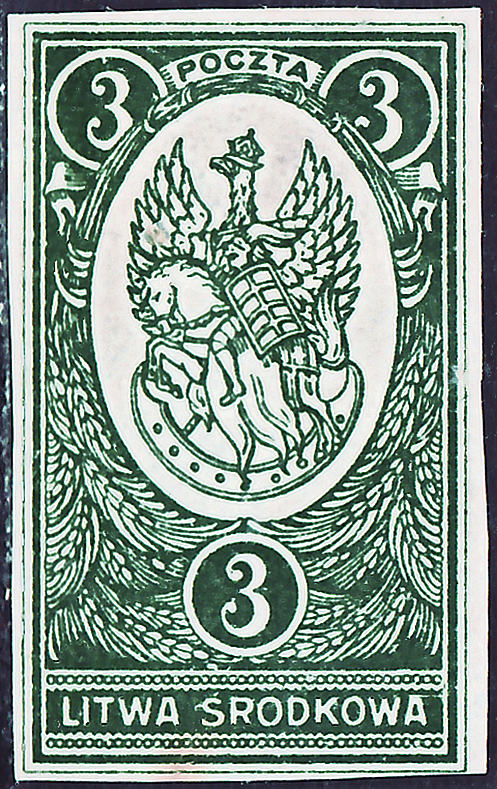
The coat of arms from 1921 postal stamp.

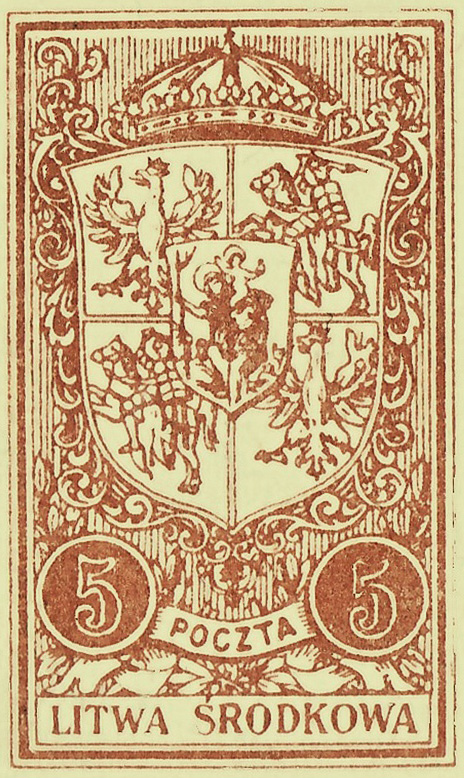
The coat of arms from 1921 postal stamp.

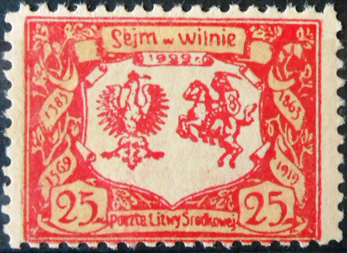
The coat of arms from 1922 postal stamp.

== See also ==
- Flag of Central Lithuania
- Coat of arms of the Podlaskie Voivodeship
