= Army of Central Lithuania =

Armed forces of the Polish puppet state of Central Lithuania

- Wojsko Litwy Środkowej
- Commemoration Badge of the Central Lithuanian Army
- Active: 12 October 1920 – 12 October 1921
- Disbanded: Autumn 1921 (Note: Redesignated as the Polish Army's 19th, 20th and 29th Infantry Divisions.)
- Country: Republic of Central Lithuania (puppet state of Second Polish Republic)
- Allegiance: Second Polish Republic
- Engagements: Lithuanian Wars of Independence; Polish–Lithuanian War; Żeligowski's Mutiny

Commanders
- First and only commander: Lucjan Żeligowski

Insignia
- Air force roundels on the right and left wings of the plane

The Army of Central Lithuania was the armed forces of the state of Central Lithuania proclaimed by General Lucjan Żeligowski on October 12, 1920, during Żeligowski's Mutiny. At first, the army occupied the Lithuanian capital Vilnius and then attacked towards the temporary capital of Lithuania, Kaunas.

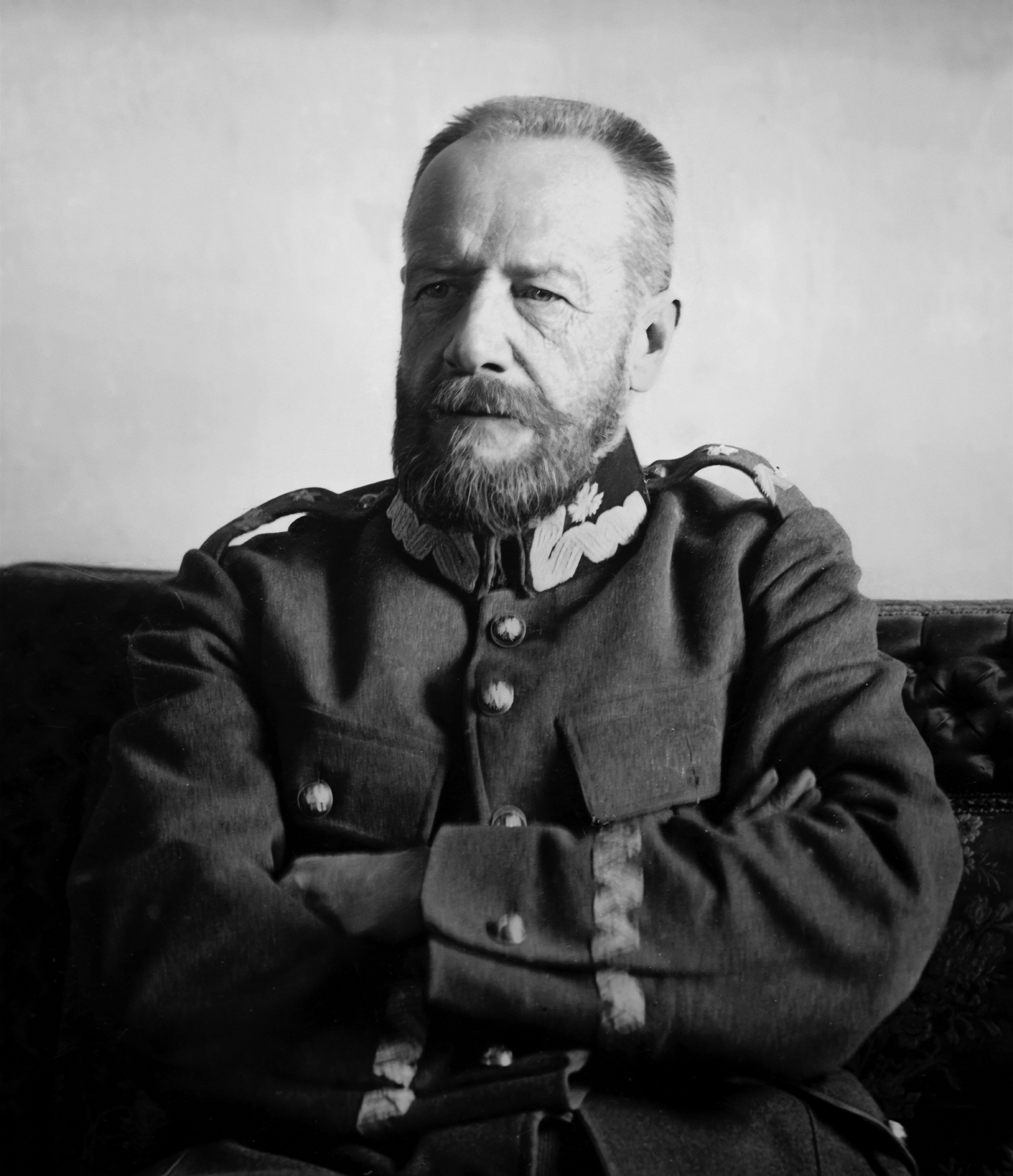
General Lucjan Żeligowski

With the announcement by General Żeligowski of the establishment of Central Lithuania, the army which he commanded and which participated in the Żeligowski's Mutiny automatically became the Army of Central Lithuania. It was reincorporated into Polish Army in October 1921, already before Poland's official annexation of Central Lithuania in spring 1922.

Central Lithuania was in the state of an undeclared war with Lithuania until 29 November 1920, when the Treaty of Kaunas concluded the larger military operations. However, skirmishes continued afterwards.

== Autumn 1920 ==
=== Starting composition ===
1st Lithuanian–Belarusian Division

- 1st Infantry Brigade
  - Vilnius Rifle Regiment (Note: Later the 85th Infantry Regiment of the Polish Army.) (RR)
  - Minsk RR (Note: Later the 86th Infantry Regiment of the Polish Army.)
- 2nd Infantry Brigade
  - Novogrudok RR (Note: Later the 80th Infantry Regiment of the Polish Army.)
  - Grodno RR (Note: Later the 81st Infantry Regiment of the Polish Army.)
- 1st Lithuanian–Belarusian Field Artillery Regiment
- Mounted Riflemen Squadron
- 1st Sapper Company
- Mjr. Kościałkowski's Grupa Bieniakonie
- Border Battalion
- 216th Field Artillery Squadron
- Cavalry Squadron

=== Military operations ===
After the occupation of Vilnius, the Supreme Commander of the Army of Central Lithuania, General Żeligowski, ordered the troops to advance to the line: Trakai–Kraso (in Polish) (?)–Rykantai and Bendoriai–Riešė–Raudondvaris.

=== 1st Central Lithuanian Army Corps ===
During the fighting, the Army of Central Lithuania was reorganized and on 16 October 1920, the 1st Central Lithuanian Army Corps was created. The corps commander was General Jan Rządkowski, the commander of the 1st Lithuanian-Belarusian Division.

- Command
  - Commanding officer – gen. Jan Rządkowski
- Staff
  - Chief of Staff – p.o. mjr SG Władysław Powierza
  - Quartermaster– p.o. mjr SG Władysław Powierza
  - Chief of the 4th Branch (Oddziału IV) – p.o. mjr SG Władysław Powierza

1st Division (Vilnius IB)

- Vilnius RR
- Minsk RR

2nd Division (2nd Grodno IB)

- Novogrudok RR
- Grodno RR

3rd Division

- Lida RR (Note: Later the 76th Infantry Regiment of the Polish Army.)
- Kaunas RR (Note: Later the 77th Infantry Regiment of the Polish Army.)

3rd Upper Niemen (Nadniemeńska) IB

- 5th Volunteer RR
- 6th Scout RR (Note: After the dissolution of the 5th Volunteer RR and the 3rd IB, the 6th Scout RR operated as a separate unit.)
- 77th Infantry Regiment (2 companies)

1st Artillery Brigade

- 1st Light Artillery Regiment
- 216th Light Artillery Regiment (2 squadrons)

Cavalry Division

Reserve Brigade

Others

- Sapper Battalion
- Armoured Car Platoon
- Services

== Autumn 1921 ==
Bieniakoni Operational Group (27 October 1921)

Infantry Division	Regiments		Garrison
19th (HQ: Vilnius)	Vilnius RR		Vilnius
19th (HQ: Vilnius)	Minsk RR		Vilnius
19th (HQ: Vilnius)	Kaunas RR		Vilnius
19th (HQ: Vilnius)	19th Field Artillery		Vilnius
19th (HQ: Vilnius)	3rd Heavy Artillery		Vilnius
29th (HQ: Vilnius)	Grodno RR		Vilnius
29th (HQ: Vilnius)	Lida RR (HQ: Benekainys)	1st Bn.	Visgirdai
29th (HQ: Vilnius)	Lida RR (HQ: Benekainys)	2nd Bn.	Šalčininkai
29th (HQ: Vilnius)	Lida RR (HQ: Benekainys)	3rd Bn.	Jeruzalė
29th (HQ: Vilnius)	Novogrudok RR		Vilnius
29th (HQ: Vilnius)	29th Field Artillery		Vilnius
29th (HQ: Vilnius)	29th Heavy Artillery Sq., III Sq./ 3rd Heavy Artillery		Vilnius

Cavalry Brigade	Uhlan Regiment	Squadron	Garrison
3rd (HQ: Vilnius)	10th Lithuanian (HQ: Lentvaris)	1	Rūdiškės
3rd (HQ: Vilnius)	10th Lithuanian (HQ: Lentvaris)	2	Lentvaris
3rd (HQ: Vilnius)	10th Lithuanian (HQ: Lentvaris)	3	Trakai
3rd (HQ: Vilnius)	10th Lithuanian (HQ: Lentvaris)	4	Valkininkai
3rd (HQ: Vilnius)	10th Lithuanian (HQ: Lentvaris)	Machine carbine	Trakai
3rd (HQ: Vilnius)	10th Lithuanian (HQ: Lentvaris)	Technical	Švenčionys
3rd (HQ: Vilnius)	13th Vilnius (HQ: Vilnius)	1	Vilnius
3rd (HQ: Vilnius)	13th Vilnius (HQ: Vilnius)	2	Paberžė
3rd (HQ: Vilnius)	13th Vilnius (HQ: Vilnius)	3	Trakai
3rd (HQ: Vilnius)	13th Vilnius (HQ: Vilnius)	4	Griciūnai
3rd (HQ: Vilnius)	13th Vilnius (HQ: Vilnius)	Machine carbine	Vilnius
3rd (HQ: Vilnius)	13th Vilnius (HQ: Vilnius)	Technical	Vilnius
3rd (HQ: Vilnius)	23rd Grodno (HQ: Maišiagala)	1	Medžiukai
3rd (HQ: Vilnius)	23rd Grodno (HQ: Maišiagala)	2	Kiemeliai
3rd (HQ: Vilnius)	23rd Grodno (HQ: Maišiagala)	3	Trakai, Paberžė
3rd (HQ: Vilnius)	23rd Grodno (HQ: Maišiagala)	4	Paberžė
3rd (HQ: Vilnius)	23rd Grodno (HQ: Maišiagala)	Machine carbine	Leoniškės
3rd (HQ: Vilnius)	23rd Grodno (HQ: Maišiagala)	Technical	Maišiagala

== Sources ==
- Łach, Wiesław Bolesław (2014). „Bunt” Żeligowskiego: Kulisy przyłączenia Wileńszczyzny do Polski 1920–1922 (in Polish). Warszawa: Bellona. ISBN 978-83-11-13198-9.
