= 23rd Grodno Uhlan Regiment =

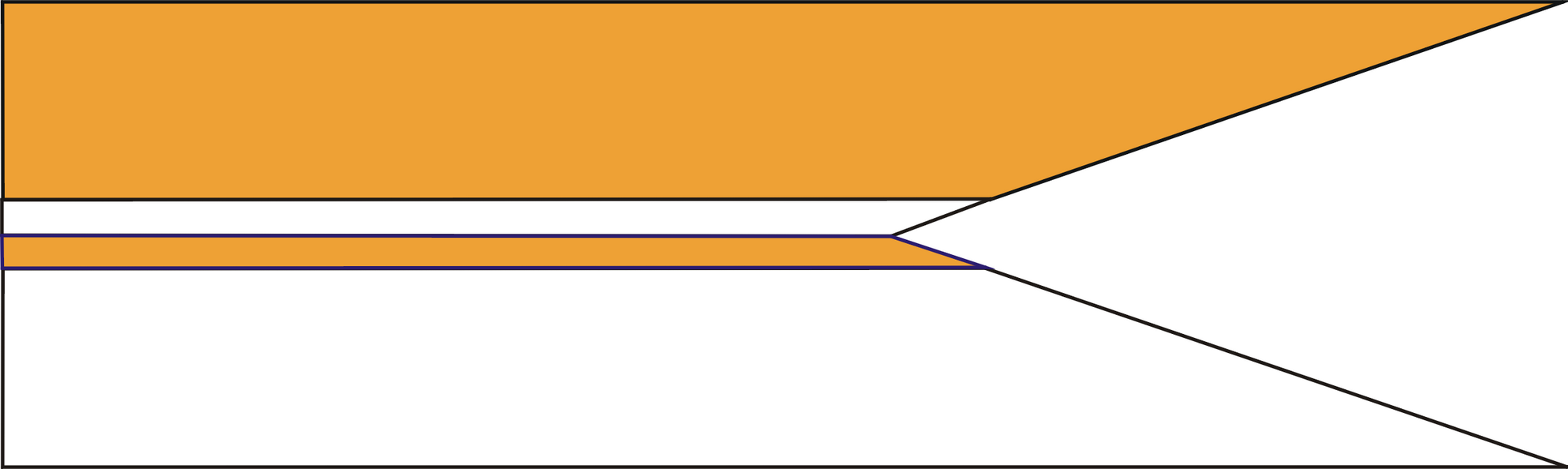
Prop 23pul

23rd Grodno Uhlan Regiment (Polish: 23 Pułk Ułanów Grodzieńskich, 23 p.ul.) was a uhlan regiment of the Polish Army in the Second Polish Republic. Formed in 1920, it fought both in the Polish–Soviet War and the Invasion of Poland. The regiment was garrisoned in the town of Postawy (modern Belarus), and belonged to Wileńska Cavalry Brigade.

== Formation ==
The regiment was formed in 1920, when the 3rd Mounted Rifle Squadron, the 211th Uhlan Regiment and the 2nd Hussar Squadron of Central Lithuania were merged. Until 1922, it was part of the Army of Central Lithuania. It was officially named the 23rd Grodno Uhlan Regiment on June 1, 1921, and that name referred to the 23rd Lithuanian Uhlan Regiment, which had fought in the November Uprising.

== World War II ==
=== Polish Defense War of 1939 ===
During the 1939 Invasion of Poland, the Grodno Uhlans were part of the Wilenska Cavalry Brigade. Transported by rail to the area of Przedbórz in central Poland, the unit took its defensive position on September 6. Since the town of Przedborz had already been seized by the Wehrmacht, the regiment was ordered to march to Opoczno, which, as it turned out, had also been captured by the enemy. On the night of September 9/10, 1939, the regiment was surrounded in the forests near Przysucha. After a bloody night battle, elements of the unit managed to break through and escape to the Świętokrzyskie Mountains. Nevertheless, the regiment ceased to exist, although its subunits continued fighting in the mountains until October 1939.

=== Operation Tempest in 1944 ===
In February 1944, the regiment was recreated by the Home Army, to fight in Operation Tempest. Commanded by Colonel Jaroslaw Gasiewski, it fought in the area of Vilnius and Novogrudok, capitulating to the Germans in September 1944 in Kampinos Forest.

== Commandants ==
- Colonel Franciszek Kaczkowski (1920-1921),
- Colonel Witold Lada-Zabłocki (1921-1922),
- Colonel Mariusz Zaruski (1922-1923),
- Colonel Aleksander Zelio (1923-1928),
- Colonel Kazimierz Duchnowski (1928-1931),
- Colonel Józef Świerczyński (1931-1938)
- Colonel Zygmunt Milkowski (1938-1939)
- Colonel Jarosław Gąsiewski "Jar" (1943-1944)

== Symbols ==
The flag, funded by the residents of the Land of Grodno, was handed during a ceremony in Vilnius on August 13, 1922. The ceremony was attended by Józef Piłsudski.

The military authorities approved the badge on January 30, 1923. It was in the shape of the Maltese cross, with a white shield in the middle and the number 23.

== Sources ==
- Kazimierz Satora: Opowieści wrześniowych sztandarów. Warszawa: Instytut Wydawniczy Pax, 1990
- Henryk Smaczny: Księga kawalerii polskiej 1914-1947: rodowody, barwa, broń. Warszawa: TESCO, 1989

== See also ==
- Polish cavalry
