= Battle of Cârlibaba =

Battle of the Eastern Front of the World War I

- Part of the Eastern Front of the World War I
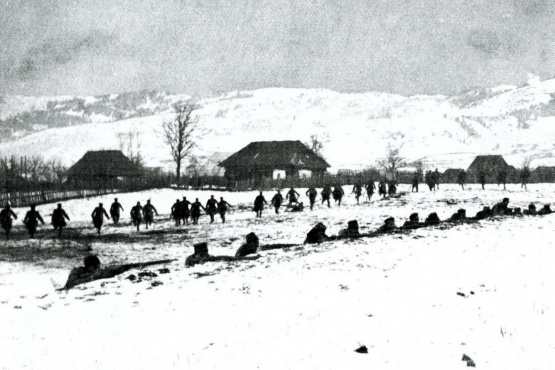
- 2nd Infantry Regiment of the Polish Legions of the Russian Empire, charging at the enemy forces on 18 January 1915.
| Date | 18–22 January 1915 |
| Location | Near Cârlibaba, Romania |
| Result | Austro-Hungarian victory |

Belligerents
| Austria-Hungary | Russian Empire |

Commanders and leaders
| (Austria-Hungary) Karl von Pflanzer-Baltin (Austria-Hungary) Emil Schultheiss (Austria-Hungary) Zygmunt Zieliński (Austria-Hungary) Marian Januszajtis-Żegota | Lucjan Żeligowski |

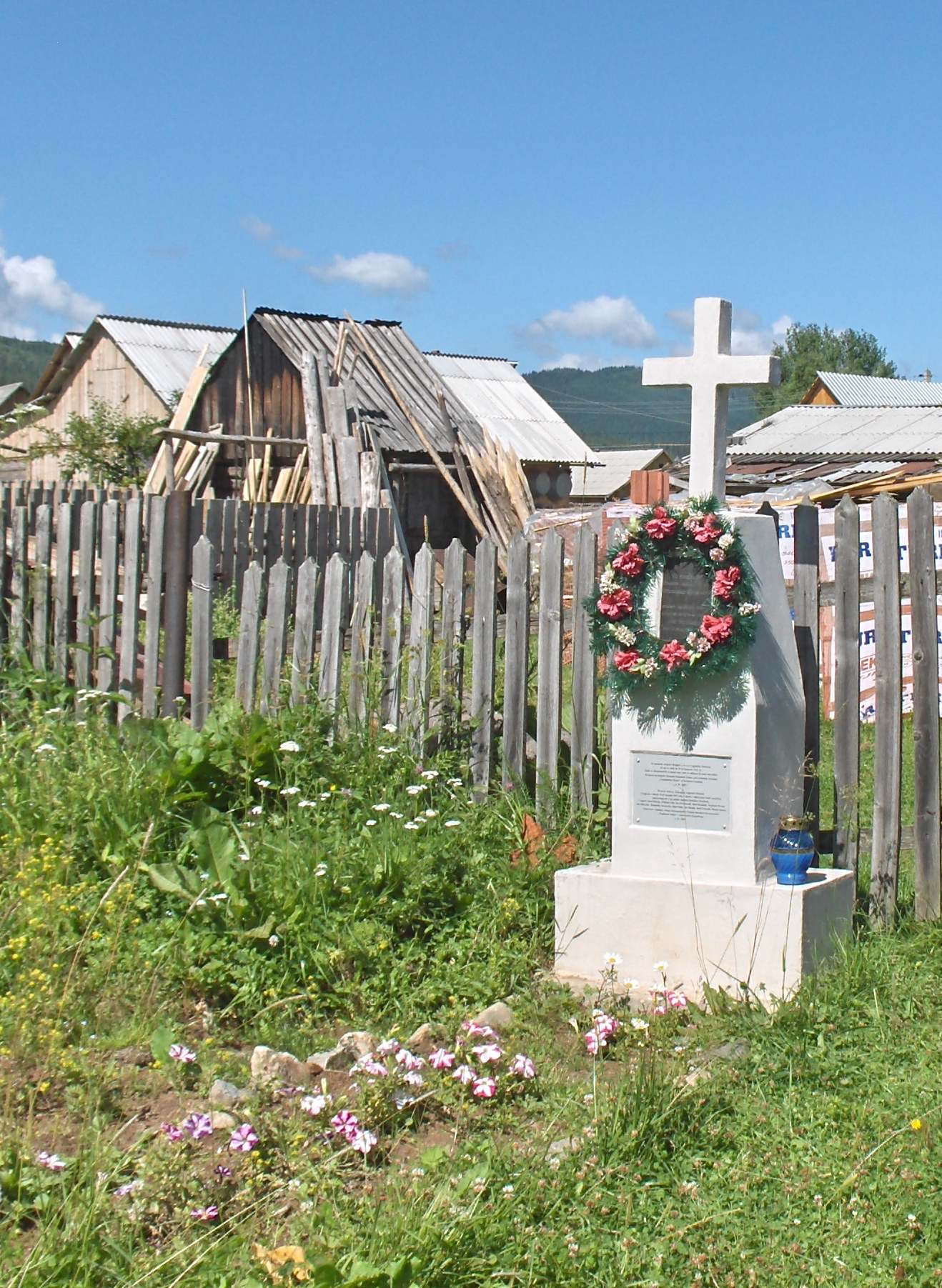
The grave of the soldiers of the Polish Legions that died in the battle, located in Cârlibaba, Romania.

The Battle of Cârlibaba was a battle of the Eastern Front of the World War I, fought between 18 and 22 January 1915. It took place near the village of Cârlibaba, Romania near the Bistrița river. It was fought between the Russian Empire, and the Austria-Hungary. The battle ended with the victory of Austria-Hungarian forces. The Russian forces were commanded by Lucjan Żeligowski, while Austria-Hungarian, by Karl von Pflanzer-Baltin, Emil Schultheiss, Zygmunt Zieliński, Marian Januszajtis-Żegota.
