= Flag of Central Lithuania =

- Adopted: 12 October 1920
- Design: Red rectangle with silver (white) eagle and silver (white) Pahonia (a knight on a horse) in the middle

The flag of the Republic of Central Lithuania, an unrecognized short-lived puppet republic of Poland, was established on 12 October 1920 and remained in use until 18 April 1922, when the state ceased to exist.

== Design ==
The flag was officially defined as a red flag with eagle and Pahonia (a knight on a horse) on it. It consists of 2 charges set next to each other in the middle. On the right is a silver (white) eagle, and on the left, a silver (white) Pahonia, a charge, that consists of a knight with a sword in his right hand, and a shield with the Cross of Lorraine in his left hand, that is sitting on a jumping horse.

== History ==
The flag was established as the symbol of the state, on 12 November 1920, in the Decree No. 1 of the Chief-in-command of the Army of Central Lithuania. It stopped being used after the Republic of Central Lithuania was incorporated into Poland on 18 April 1922.

== See also ==
- Coat of arms of Central Lithuania
