= Lucjan Żeligowski =

Polish general (1865–1947)

General Lucjan Żeligowski
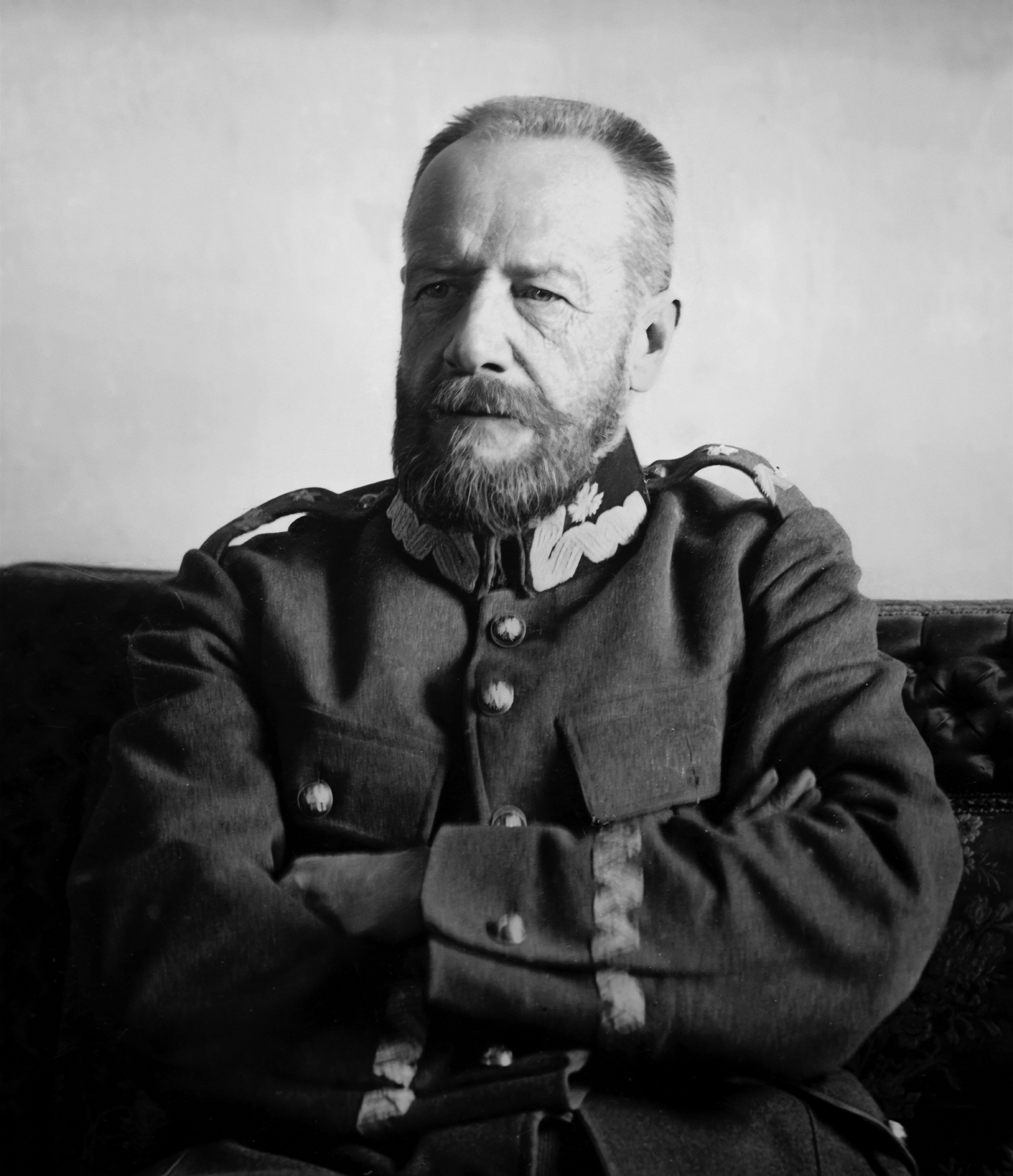

Commander-in-chief of the Republic of Central Lithuania
- In office 12 October 1920 – 24 March 1922
- Preceded by: office established
- Succeeded by: office abolished

Personal details
- Born: 17 October 1865 Oshmyansky Uyezd, Russian Empire (now Belarus)
- Died: 9 July 1947 (aged 81) London, England
- Awards: Virtuti Militari Commander's Cross Virtuti Militari Silver Medal Polonia Restituta Grand Cross Krzyz Walecznych Cross of Independence Cross of Military Merits of Central Lithuania

Military service
- Allegiance: Russian Empire (1885–1919); Poland (1919–1920, 1922–1927, 1939); Central Lithuania (1920–1922); Polish government-in-exile (1939–1940)
- Branch/service: Imperial Russian Army (1885–1915, 1917); Polish Armed Forces in the East (1915–1917, 1917–1919); Polish Armed Forces (1919–1920, 1922–1927, 1939); Army of Central Lithuania (1920–1922); Polish Armed Forces in the West (1940)
- Years of service: 1885–1926; 1939–1940
- Rank: General of the branch
- Commands: Front Commander; Head of State of Central Lithuania; Minister of Military Affairs
- Battles/wars: Russo-Japanese War; World War I; Battle of Cârlibaba; Polish–Ukrainian War; Polish–Soviet War; Polish–Lithuanian War; Żeligowski's Mutiny; Central Lithuanian Offensive; World War II; Invasion of Poland

Lucjan Żeligowski (Polish pronunciation: [ˈlut͡sjan ʐɛliˈɡɔfskʲi]; Belarusian: Люцыя́н Жаліго́ўскі; Russian: Люциа́н Гу́ставович Желиго́вский; 17 October 1865 – 9 July 1947) was a Polish general, politician, military commander and veteran of World War I, the Polish-Soviet War and World War II. He is mostly remembered for his role in Żeligowski's Mutiny and as head of a short-lived Republic of Central Lithuania.

== Biography ==
Lucjan Żeligowski was born on October 17, 1865 in the Przechody folwark by the village of Sikunie (Note: In 1935 Sikūnė (Russian: Сикунь) was renamed to Żeligowo in the Interwar Poland; now it is Желигово (coord: N 54° 29' 33.8568" E 26° 13' 2.0928") in Smarhon District, Grodno Region, Belarus) in Oshmyansky Uyezd, in the Russian Empire to Gustaw Żeligowski and Władysława née Tarczewska. His parents were exiled deep into Russia for their participation in the uprising, so he was raised by distant relatives on his mother’s side, Walerian Mikosz and Erna née Tornau.

He received his early education at a school in Żuprany, and later attended a gymnasium in Vilnius, where he obtained his matura. He then joined the Russian army as a volunteer and was assigned to the 115th Vyazemsky Infantry Regiment. From there he was sent to the Military School first in Riga (1885), later in Vilnius. After graduating in 1888, he served in the 136th Taganrog Infantry Regiment in Novocherkassk, and later in Yelizavetgrad (14 July 1903) and Rostov-on-Don (13 February 1913).

Żeligowski fought in the Russo-Japanese War of 1904-1905. During the revolution, he openly supported democratic reforms, for which he was brought before a military court on charges of conduct unbecoming an officer. He avoided conviction thanks to the support of senior officers and the Polish Circle in the State Duma. He learned about the decisive support provided by Polish deputies only 20 years later.

In 1912, he joined the clandestine Union of Active Struggle (Związek Walki Czynnej), which was affiliated with the Polish Socialist Party (PPS). During the First World War he served as a lieutenant colonel and commanding officer of an Imperial Russian rifle regiment.

=== Serving in the Polish Army ===
In the second half of 1915, the formation of the Polish Rifle Brigade began in Bobruisk, with Żeligowski appointed commander of the 2nd Battalion.

After the February Revolution of 1917, Żeligowski became one of the organizers of the Polish Army in the former Russian Empire. Initially commander of an infantry regiment in the ranks of the Polish 1st Corps, he was quickly promoted and given command over a brigade. In 1918 he started the creation of a Polish unit in the area of Kuban, which eventually became the 4th Polish Rifle Division. As part of the Polish Army, his unit fought alongside the Denikin's Whites in the Russian Civil War. In October of the same year he became the Commander in Chief of all the Polish units fighting in Russia.

After the outbreak of the Polish-Bolshevik War and the defeat of Denikin, Żeligowski's unit was ordered to retreat to Romanian Bessarabia, where it took part in defence of the border against Bolshevik raids. Finally, in April 1919, the division was withdrawn to the newly established Second Polish Republic, where it was incorporated into the Polish Army and renamed to the Polish 10th Infantry Division.

During the war against the Bolshevist Russia, Żeligowski, a personal friend of Polish Marshal Józef Piłsudski, was quickly promoted to general and given the command over an operational group of his name, composed of his 10th division and additional units, mostly of partisan origin. As such, he soon became the commanding officer of the entire Lithuanian-Belarusian Front, operating in the area of Polesie and the Pinsk Marshes. During the Battle of Warsaw in 1920 his unit was attached to the 3rd Polish Army and took part in the pursuit of fleeing Bolshevik and Soviet forces at the Battle of the Niemen. Following the Battle of Warsaw, Żeligowski wrote:

"There was a paradoxical situation .. when Warsaw was defended and the war was won, we, the citizens of our homeland - Lithuania, could not even return to the house where the Zhmudin people settled, protégé of the Germans ... Having lost Lithuania - Poland lost much of its statehood. Polish politicians didn't understand that, only every soldier, even a Lithuanian citizen, understood that."

=== Republic of Central Lithuania ===
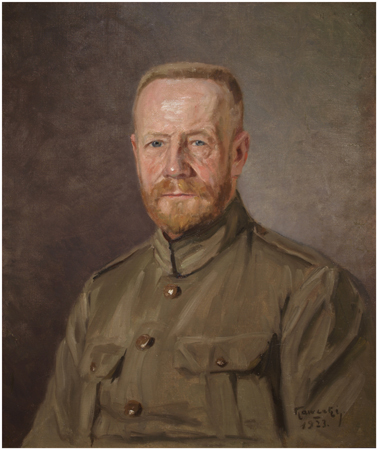
Lucjan Żeligowski, 1932

Żeligowski's family coat-of-arms, Łabędź ("Swan").

In October 1920, Żeligowski, a native of historical lands of Lithuania, was chosen to command the 1st Lithuanian-Belarusian Infantry Division, composed mainly of PMO members, volunteers and partisans from the territory of modern Belarus and Lithuania. On October 8, 1920, after a staged mutiny, he "defected" with his unit and took control over the city of Vilnius and its area. The mutiny, named after him, would be remembered as the defining moment of his life. On October 12, he proclaimed independence of the said area as Republic of Central Lithuania, with Wilno as its capital. Initially a de facto military dictator, after the parliamentary elections he passed his powers to the newly elected parliament, which in turn decided to submit the area to Poland.

According to Lucjan Żeligowski's point of view:

"But not only geographically, Lithuania was the heart of the Slavs. It was morally. She, one of all the Slavic peoples, could easily talk with everyone. As with Poland, so with Russia, so with Ukraine. The mentality of the Lithuanian peoples was, as it were, created to reconcile everyone. He never had hostility, neither national, nor religious, nor cultural."

Regarding his invasion of Lithuania in October 1920, Żeligowski wrote:

On 9 October 1920, with the army, made up of the sons of Lithuania and Belarus, Vilnius was occupied not by the Polish general Żeligowski, but by the Lithuanian Żeligowski, who came as a child from Žiupronys to Vilnius for school exams and spent the night on the benches of city parks.

In the 14th-century Lithuanian Chronicles, there was written about mobilization in Ašmena, where it was mentioned that Jokūbas Želigovskis had a horse, weapon, axe, etc. In the history of a Russian uhlan regiment from 1863, it was mentioned that in the surroundings of Rūdninkai after a fierce fight, the fifteen-year-old Juozas Želigovskis was taken prisoner and letters were found by his side, where his mother encouraged him to fight.

So I was not an accidental out-of-nowhere in Lithuania, but my family has a long tradition and served in the Fatherland's defence. My dream was to live with my countrymen in the Vilnius region. I did not divide them into Poles, Belarusians and Samogitians. As a Lithuanian, I never stopped being Polish. These two concepts are intertwined. They complement each other. I am talking about all this in order to prove that it was all more than a Polish general's seizure of Vilnius.

Żeligowski later in his memoir which was published in London in 1943 condemned the annexation of Republic by Poland, as well as the policy of closing Belarusian schools and general disregard of Marshal Józef Piłsudski's confederation plans by Polish ally.

=== Later life ===
After the annexation of Central Lithuania to Poland, Żeligowski continued his service in the Polish Army. Promoted to three-star general in 1923, he served as an army inspector, or a commander of a military district of the capital city of Warsaw. In 1925 he also became the Polish Minister of Military Affairs. Ousted by Piłsudski's coup d'état (the May Coup), he was soon returned to the post. He retired the following year and settled in his family manor in Andrzejewo near Vilnius.

In 1930 he published a book containing his memoirs of the Polish-Bolshevik War named War of 1920: Memories and thoughts (Wojna w roku 1920. Wspomnienia i rozważania). He also wrote numerous articles on the conflicts of early 20th century for a variety of Polish newspapers. In 1935 he was elected a member of parliament and remained in the Sejm until the outbreak of World War II in 1939.

==== World War II and death ====
During the Invasion of Poland, Żeligowski volunteered for the Polish Armed Forces, but was not accepted due to his old age (he was 74 at that time) and poor health. Nevertheless, he served as an advisor to the command of the Polish southern front. After the Polish defeat, he evaded being captured by the Germans and the Soviets and managed to reach France, where he joined the Polish Government in Exile headed by General Władysław Sikorski. An active member of the Polish National Council, an advisory body, he escaped to London after the French defeat in 1940.

After the end of Second World War Żeligowski declared he would return to Poland, but he suddenly died on 9 July 1947 in London. His body was brought back to Poland, and Żeligowski was buried in the Powązki Military Cemetery in Warsaw.

== Honours and awards ==
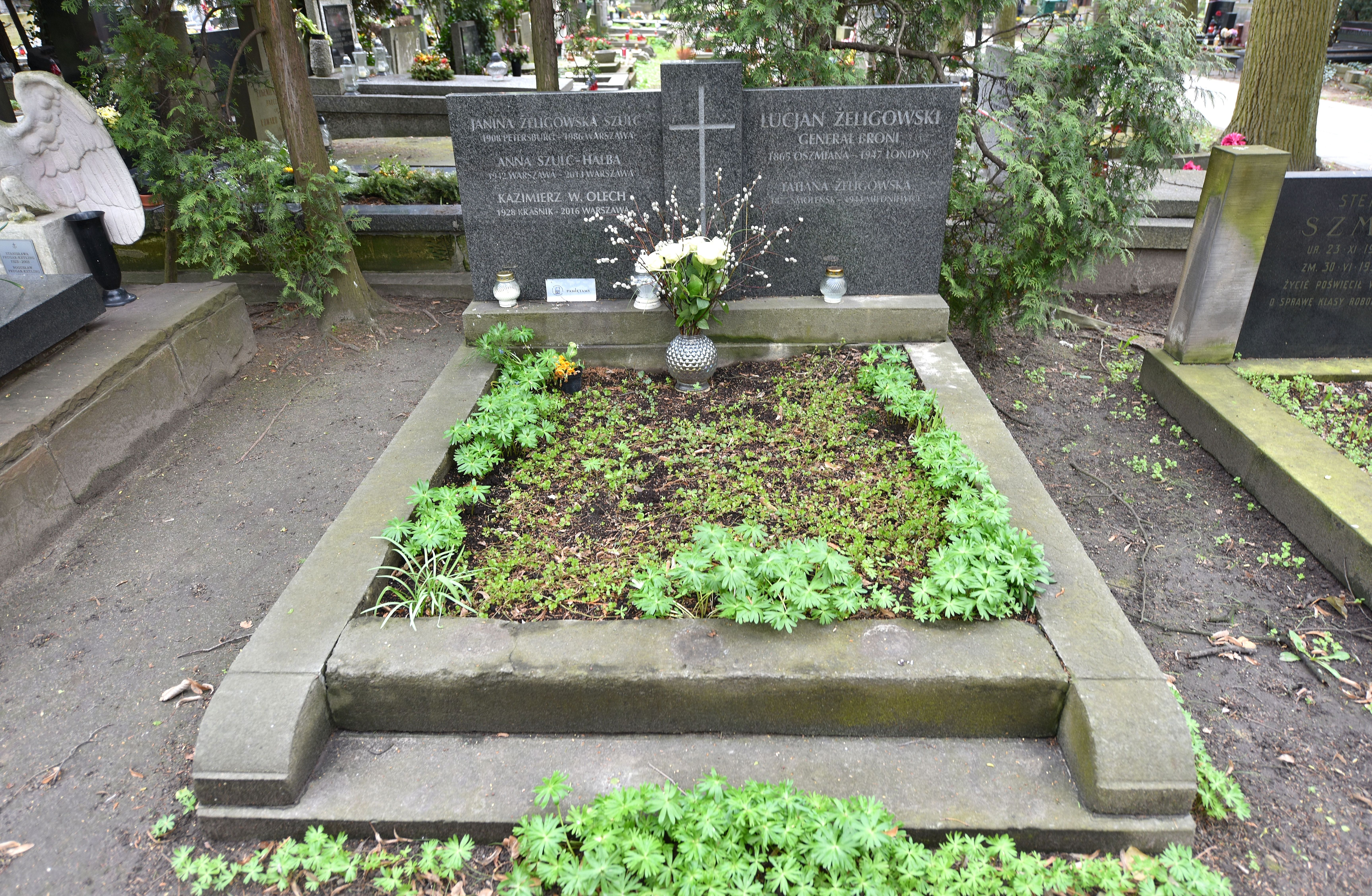
Żeligowski's grave at Powązki Military Cemetery

- Commander's Cross of the Virtuti Militari, also awarded the Silver Cross
- Grand Cross of the Polonia Restituta
- Cross of Independence with Swords (25 February 1932)
- Cross of Valour - four times
- Cross of Merit of the Army of Central Lithuania
- Commemorative Medal of the War of 1918-1921
- Medal "Decade of the Restoration of Independence" (Poland)
- Order of St. George IV class (Russian Empire)
- Order of St. Vladimir with Swords class IV (Russian Empire)
- Order of St. Anna, class II and III (Russian Empire)
- Order of St. Stanislaus, II class (Russian Empire)
- Commander's Cross of the Legion of Honour (France)
- Croix de Guerre (France)
- Golden Laurel of the Polish Academy of Literature
- Honorary citizen of Warsaw

=== Published works ===
- Lucjan Żeligowski, Wojna w roku 1920: Wspomnienia I Rozwazania, Warszawa: Wydawn. Ministerstwa * Obrony Narodowej, 1990.
- Lucjan Żeligowski, O ideę słowiańską. London: F. Mildner & Sons, 1941.
- Lucjan Żeligowski, Zapomniane prawdy. London: F. Mildner & Sons, 1941.

== See also ==
- Central Lithuania
- Legion of Honour
- List of Legion of Honour recipients by name (Z)
- Legion of Honour Museum
