= Henryk Merczyng =

Russian physicist and electrical engineer

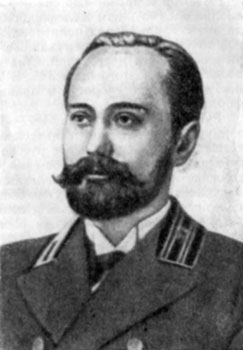
- Born: 5 February 1860; Zgierz, Congress Poland, Russian Empire
- Died: 14 September 1916 (aged 56); Petrograd, Russian Empire
- Other name: Edward Czyński
- Citizenship: Russian
- Education: Imperial University of Warsaw, St. Petersburg Institute of Communication Engineers
- Scientific career
- Fields: Electrical engineering
- Workplaces: St. Petersburg Institute for Communication Engineers, St. Petersburg Electrotechnical Institute, Russian Ministry of Communication

Henryk Merczyng (Russian: Генрих Карлович Мерчинг, alias Edward Czyński; 5 February 1860 – 14 September 1916) was a physicist, professor of electrical engineering at St. Petersburg Institute of Communication Engineers, pioneer of railway electrification projects, amateur historian and demographer.

== Biography ==
Merczyng was born on 5 February 1860 in Zgierz, Russian Empire (now Poland) to a Calvinist family of Jan Karol Merczyng and Matylda née Schlabic. His father was a known architect from Łęczyca County. He graduated with honors from the Faculty of Physics and Mathematics at the Imperial University of Warsaw (1882) and continued his education at the St. Petersburg Institute of Communication Engineers. In 1883, he founded, together with Władysław Natanson, a semi-legal organization for Polish students (which later transformed into the Association of Polish Physicians and Naturalists (Polish: Związek Polskich Lekarzy i Przyrodników)). After finishing his studies in 1885, he worked as a clerk at the Novaja Alexandrija train station (now Puławy). In 1887 he began teaching at his alma mater in St. Petersburg.

=== Physicist and engineer ===
In 1890 Merczyng started lecturing on electrical engineering and telegraphy. He established the first electrotechnical laboratory at the university. One of his lab assistants was the noted Polish hydrologist Alfred Rundo. Since 1892, he had been employed as an adjunct professor. He became an associate professor in 1896 and was granted full professorship in electrical engineering in 1904. During his career as a professor, he supervised some of the first diploma theses on the subjects of electric power systems (tramway, railway, and hydropower) and electrification of rolling stock repair plants. He also taught at the St. Petersburg Electrotechnical Institute.

Merczyng was a State Councillor and participated in works of the engineering council of the Russian Ministry of Communication. He was the primary initiator of plans for the electrification of Russian railways and developed pioneering projects in this area: the St. Petersburg junction, the Transcaucasus railways (1911), and the Moscow junction (1912).

Some of Merczyng's research dealt with the theory of fluid flow through pipelines. The results of his studies were later used during the construction of Baku-Batumi oil pipeline. He also conducted comprehensive experiments in the field of optics and light waves (concerning mainly diffraction, wavelengths, and dispersion).

He was a member of the Polish colony in St. Petersburg and belonged to the local management board of Polish Higher Courses.

=== Historian and demographer ===
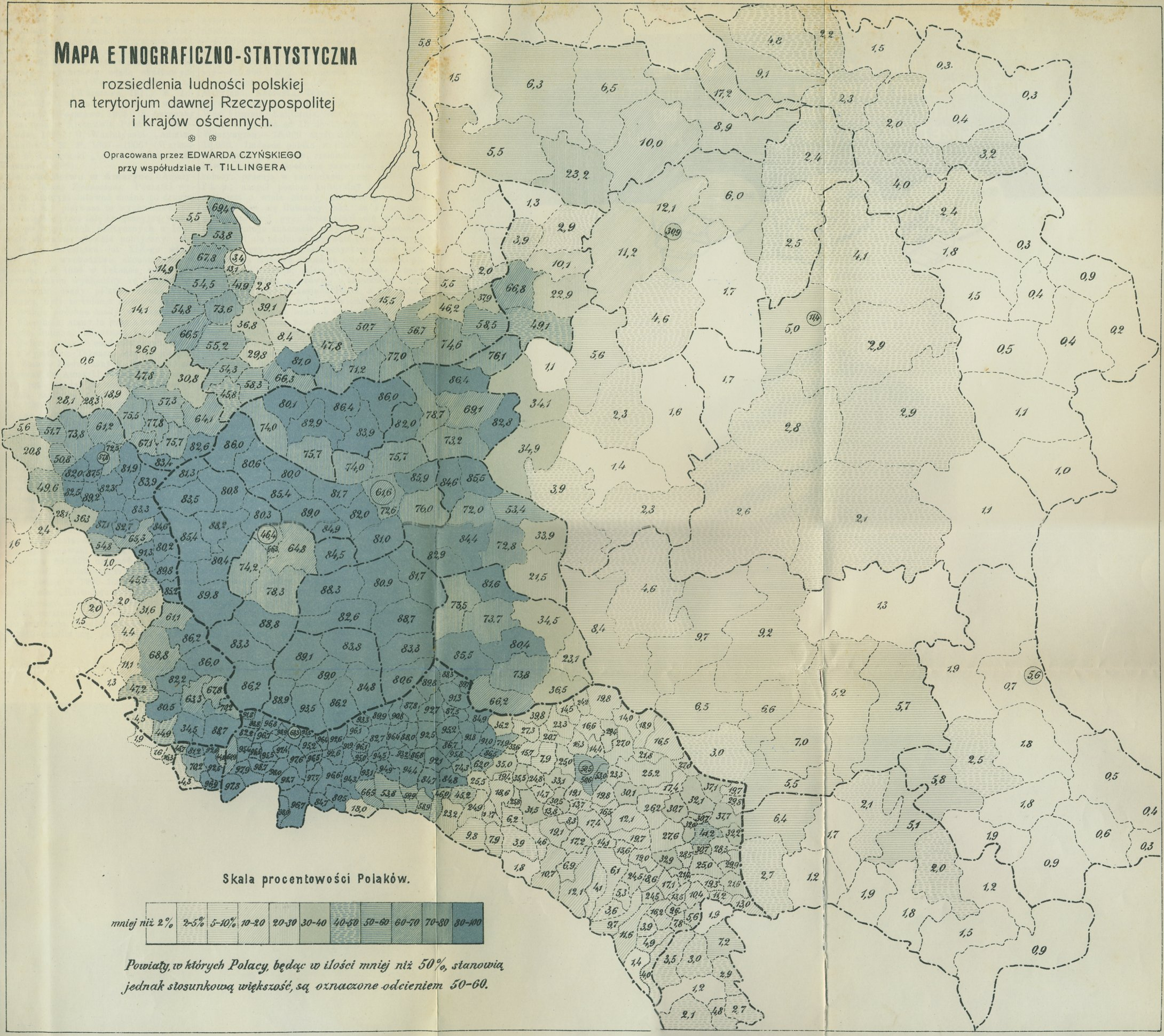
Merczyng's (Edward Czyński's) map from his 1909 paper, featuring data from the 1897 Russian Census, was reproduced in 1912 in Olgelbrand's Encyclopedia.

Merczyng took particular interest in the history of reformation in Poland, issues of demography and historical geography. He conducted research on these topics in libraries and archives in both the Russian Empire and Austria-Hungary. In 1887 he authored his "Ethnographical-Statistical Outline of the Numerical Strength and Distribution of the Polish Population" (Polish: Etnograficzno-Statystyczny Zarys Liczebności i Rozsiedlenia Ludności Polskiej), which was republished with changes in 1909. The new edition included significantly different data for the Russian Empire's territory – the first version relied on church statistics, while the second repeated results of the 1897 Russian census. In his 1909 work, Merczyng wrote that the Russian Census may have incorrectly classified up to half a million Poles as another (Belarusian) nationality. However, this did not affect the data or the map he published, which mirrors the figures reported in the 1897 Census. Merczyng's map from 1909 was included in Olgelbrand's Encyclopedia.

He is considered one of the pioneers of research on the history of Polish nontrinitarianism (especially Arianism). His works on the Polish Reformation movement are valued mainly due to the large number of primary sources employed, many of which are now lost or no longer available. Among his most important publications are: "Zbory i Senatorowie Protestanccy w Dawnej Polsce" (1904) ("Protestant Congregations and Senators in Old Poland"). and "Zbiór Pomników Reformacji Kościoła Polskiego i Litewskiego" (Monumenta Reformationis Polonicae et Lithuanicae, "A Collection of Monuments of the Polish and Lithuanian Reformation") (1911).

Merczyng, in cooperation with Jan Jakubowski, mathematically analyzed the Radziwiłł map of the Grand Duchy of Lithuania.

== Selected works ==
- "O Własnościach Ogniskowych Siatek Dyfrakcyjnych" (1882) ("On the Focal Properties of Diffraction Gratings")
- "Mikołaj Kopernik. Życie i Działalność Naukowa" (1888) ("Nicolaus Copernicus. Life and Scientific Activity")
- "Zasady Elektrotechniki" (1889) ("Principles of Electrotechnics")
- "Dumania Przyrodnika" (1900) (Reflections of a Naturalist)
- "Teorya Prądu Elektrycznego. Zarys Zasadniczych Praw Ustalonego i Nieustalonego Prądu Elektrycznego i Towarzyszących mu Zakłóceń Magnetycznych. Podstawy Elektromagnetycznej Teoryi Światła" (1905) ("Theory of Electric Current: Outline of Fundamental Laws of Steady and Transient Electric Current and its Accompanying Magnetic Disturbances. Foundations of the Electromagnetic Theory of Light")
- "Podręcznik Matematyczny Szkół Polskich za Zygmunta III" (1907) ("Mathematics Textbook of Polish Schools during the Reign of Sigismund III")
- "The Unitarian Movement in Poland from 1560-1660", International Congress of Free Christianity and Religious Progress (5th: 1910: Berlin, Germany)
- "O Zasadzie Względności w Pojęciu Fizycznym Czasu i Przestrzeni. Hipotezy Lorentza i Einsteina" (1911) ("On the Principle of Relativity in the Physical Meaning of Time and Space. The Hypotheses of Lorentz and Einstein"))
- "Mapa Litwy z r. 1613 ks. Radziwiłła Sierotki pod Względem Matematycznym i Kartograficznym" (1913) ("The 1613 Map of Lithuania by Prince Radziwiłł Sierotka from a Mathematical and Cartographic Perspective")
- "Szymon Budny jako Krytyk Tekstów Biblijnych" (1913) ("Szymon Budny as a Critic of Biblical Texts")
