= Piotr Eberhardt =

Polish geographer (1935–2020)

Piotr Eberhardt (December 27, 1935 – September 10, 2020) was a Polish geographer, a professor at the Polish Academy of Sciences and author of studies in the field of demography and population geography. His works included the ethnic problems of Central and Eastern Europe in the 20th century. He also specialized in the field of geopolitics.

== Biography ==
Eberhardt was born in Warsaw, Poland. From the 1960s onwards, he was associated with the Institute of Geography and Spatial Organization of the Polish Academy of Sciences, where in 1968 he earned his doctorate, and in 1976 habilitation. The title of professor of earth science was bestowed upon him in 1994. Since 1983 he taught at the John Paul II Catholic University of Lublin.

== Works ==
- Rozmieszczenie i dynamika ludności wiejskiej w Europie Środkowo-Wschodniej w XX wieku, Warszawa 1991
- Polska granica wschodnia 1939-1945, Warszawa 1992
- Przemiany narodowościowe na Ukrainie XX wieku, Warszawa 1994
- Przemiany narodowościowe na Białorusi, Warszawa 1994
- Między Rosją a Niemcami. Przemiany narodowościowe w Europie Środkowo-Wschodniej w XX wieku, Warszawa 1996
- Przemiany narodowościowe na Litwie, Warszawa 1998
- Polska ludność kresowa. Rodowód, liczebność, rozmieszczenie, Warszawa 1998
- Geografia ludności Rosji, Warszawa 2002
- Ethnic Groups and Population Changes in Twentieth-Century Central-Eastern Europe. History, Data and Analysis, New York, London 2003
- Polska i jej granice. Z historii polskiej geografii politycznej, Lublin 2004
- Przemiany demograficzno-etniczne na obszarze Jugosławii w XX wieku, Lublin 2005
- Twórcy polskiej geopolityki, Kraków 2006
- Political Migrations on Polish Territories 1939-1950, Warsaw 2006

== Awards ==
- 1994: prize of Przegląd Wschodni quarterly for scientific achievements related to the problems of Eastern Europe
- 2002: Stanisław Staszic Award from the Polish Academy of Sciences
- 2004: Prime Minister of Poland state prize for outstanding scientific achievements
- 2009: Zygmunt Gloger Prize and medal.
