= Rykantai =

- Village
- Location of Rykantai
- Coordinates: 54°43′N 24°59′E
- Country: Lithuania
- Ethnographic region: Aukštaitija
- County: Vilnius County
- Municipality: Trakai district municipality
- Eldership: Lentvaris elderate

Population (2011)
  - Total: 281
- Time zone: UTC+2 (EET)
  - Summer (DST): UTC+3 (EEST)

Rykantai is a village in Trakai district municipality, Lithuania, 7 kilometres north-west of Lentvaris. The village has a post office, a railway station and a church, Trinity Church. The Neris River flows north of the village. According to the Lithuanian census of 2011, it has 281 inhabitants.

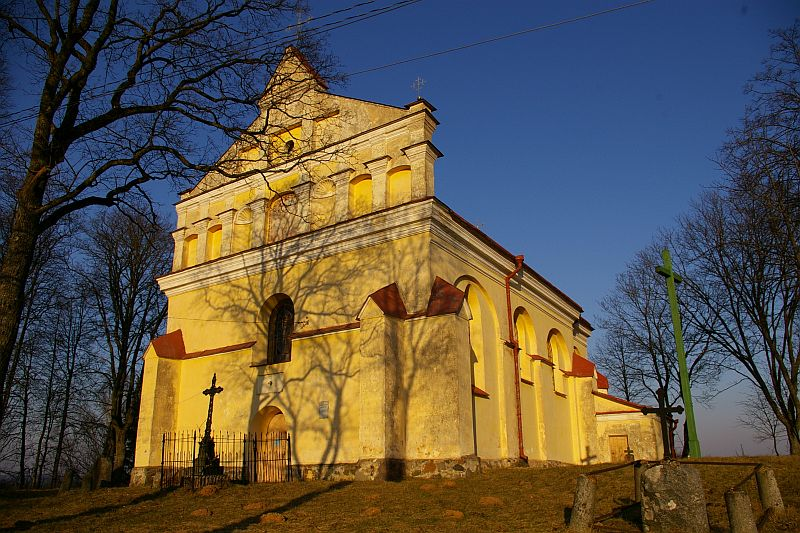
Rykantai Trinity church

Rykantai is known as one of the first reformats settlement in Lithuania. Rykantai is mentioned in Leo Tolstoy's novel War and Peace as the place where General Balashov delivers a letter from Tsar Alexander to Napoleon.
