= Republic of Central Lithuania =

Short lived puppet state of Poland (1920-1922)

Coordinates: 54°30′N 25°45′E

Republic of Central Lithuania Republika Litwy Środkowej (Polish) Vidurio Lietuvos Respublika (Lithuanian) Сярэдняя Літва (Belarusian) Siaredniaja Litva
- 1920–1922
- Flag Coat of arms
- Anthem: Rota
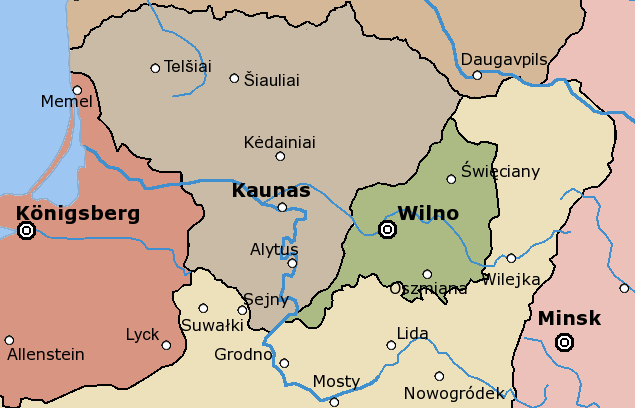
- Republic of Central Lithuania
- Status: Puppet state of the Second Polish Republic
- Capital: Vilnius
- Common languages: Polish; Lithuanian; Belarusian; Russian; Yiddish
- Religion: Catholicism; Eastern Orthodox; Judaism
- Demonym: Central Lithuanian
- Government: Republic
- Commander-in-chief
  - 1920–1922: Lucjan Żeligowski
- Chairman
  - 1920–1921 (first): Witold Abramowicz
  - 1921–1922 (last): Aleksander Meysztowicz
- Legislature: Sejm
- Historical era: Interwar period
  - Żeligowski's Mutiny: 12 October 1920
  - General election: 24 March 1922
  - Incorporation into Poland: 18 April 1922

Area
  - Total: 13,490 km^{2} (5,210 sq mi)
- Currency: Polish mark
Preceded by	Succeeded by
Lithuania; Poland	Poland
- Today part of: Lithuania; Belarus

The Republic of Central Lithuania (Polish: Republika Litwy Środkowej, Lithuanian: Vidurio Lietuvos Respublika), commonly known as the Central Lithuania, and the Middle Lithuania (Polish: Litwa Środkowa, Lithuanian: Vidurinė Lietuva, Belarusian: Сярэдняя Літва, romanized: Siaredniaja Litva), was an unrecognized short-lived puppet state of Poland, that existed from 1920 to 1922. It was founded on 12 October 1920, after the successful Żeligowski Mutiny, during which the volunteer 1st Lithuanian–Belarusian Division under the command of general Lucjan Żeligowski seized the Vilnius Region – the capital region of Lithuania. It was incorporated into Poland on 18 April 1922.

Vilnius, the historical capital of Lithuania, had a majority Polish-speaking population with a Lithuanian-speaking minority of only 2–3%. Therefore, the Polish authorities decided that the region should belong to the newly-established Polish state, and attempted to implement this idea using military force, ignoring the Curzon Line and taking advantage of the fact that victorious Poles after the Battle of Warsaw were advancing to the East against the Bolsheviks in the Polish–Soviet War. The Poles reasoned that they were justified in seizing as many mixed areas as possible, as well as to protect the Catholic, predominantly Polish-speaking population in disputed areas. Being utterly militarily outmatched, Lithuania did not stand a chance to maintain control of the region. This led to the renewal of Polish–Lithuanian War, where the so-called Żeligowski Mutiny, secretly ordered by Józef Piłsudski, was part of the military operation, fully supported and backed on the flanks by the Polish army, and consequently to the establishment of the so-called Republic of Central Lithuania.

The republic had features of a state administration, but it was an imitation of a sovereign state which repressed Lithuanian organizations and education, and censored and suspended Lithuanian publications. After a variety of delays, a disputed election took place on 8 January 1922, and the territory was annexed by Poland. Several years later, the Polish leader Józef Piłsudski confirmed that he personally ordered Żeligowski to stage a mutiny.

During the interwar period, the Polish–Lithuanian border was recognized by both the Conference of Ambassadors of the Entente and the League of Nations. However, the Kaunas-based Republic of Lithuania refused to acknowledge this boundary until the Polish ultimatum of 1938 in March, while Lithuania then accepted the status quo of so-called "demarcation line" , but the newest edition of the Constitution of Lithuania in May 1938 one more time named Vilnius the capital of Lithuania. In 1931, an international court in The Hague stated that the Polish seizure of the region had been a violation of international law, but there were no political repercussions.

== History ==
Following the partitions of Poland, most of the lands that formerly constituted the Grand Duchy of Lithuania were annexed by the Russian Empire. The Imperial government increasingly pursued a policy of Russification of the newly acquired lands, which escalated after the failed January Uprising of 1864. The discrimination against local inhabitants included restrictions and outright bans on the usage of the Polish, Lithuanian (see Lithuanian press ban), Belarusian, and Ukrainian (see Valuyev circular) languages. These measures, however, had limited effects on the Polonisation effort undertaken by the Polish patriotic leadership of the Vilnius Educational District. A similar effort was pursued during the 19th century Lithuanian National Revival, which sought to distance itself from both Polish and Russian influences.

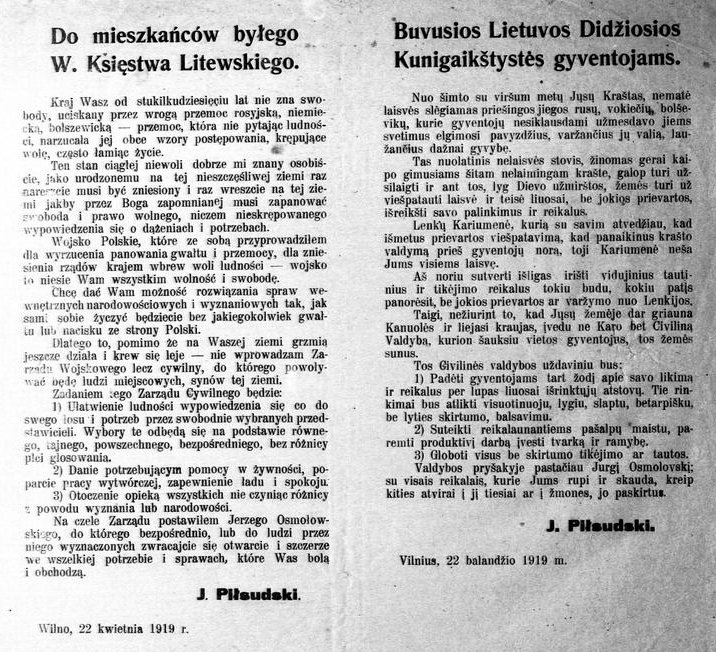
Piłsudski's bi-lingual Proclamation to the inhabitants of the former Grand Duchy of Lithuania (April 1919).

The ethnic composition of the area has long been disputed, since censuses from that time and place are often considered unreliable. According to the first census of the Russian Empire in 1897, known to have been intentionally falsified, the population of the Vilna Governorate was distributed as follows: Belarusians at 56.1% (including Roman Catholics), Lithuanians at 17.6%, Jews at 12.7%, Poles at 8.2%, Russians at 4.9%, Germans at 0.2%, Ukrainians at 0.1%, Tatars at 0.1%, and 'Others' at 0.1% as well.

The German censuses of 1915, 1916 and 1917 of the Vilnius Region (published in 1919) however, reported strikingly different numbers. In 1917 in the Vilnius city Poles were at 53.65%, Jews at 41.45%, Lithuanians at 2.1%, Belarusians at 0.44%, Russians at 1.59%, Germans at 0,63% and 'Other' at 0.14%. According to the 1916 census, Poles constituted 89.8% of the inhabitants of Vilnius county (excluding the city) and Lithuanians only 4.3%.

Censuses had encountered difficulties in the attempt to categorise their subjects. Ethnographers in the 1890s were often confronted with those who described themselves as both Lithuanians and Poles. According to a German census analyst, "Objectively determining conditions of nationality comes up against the greatest difficulties."

=== Aftermath of World War I ===
In the aftermath of the First World War, both Poland and Lithuania regained independence. The conflict between them soon arose as both Lithuania and Poland claimed Vilnius (known in Polish as Wilno) region.

Demographically, the main groups inhabiting Vilnius were Poles and Jews, with Lithuanians constituting a small fraction of the total population (2.0%–2.6%, according to the Russian census of 1897 and the German census of 1916). The Lithuanians nonetheless believed that their historical claim to Vilnius (former capital of the Grand Duchy of Lithuania) had precedence and refused to recognize any Polish claims to the city and the surrounding area.

While Poland under Józef Piłsudski attempted to create a Polish-led federation in the area that would include a number of ethnically non-Polish territories (Międzymorze), Lithuania strove to create a fully independent state that would include the Vilnius region. Two early 20th-century censuses indicated that Lithuanian speakers, whose language in the second half of the 19th century was suppressed by the Russian policies and had unfavourable conditions within the Catholic church, became a minority in the region. Based on this, Lithuanian authorities argued that the majority of inhabitants living there, even if they at the time did not speak Lithuanian, were thus Polonized (or Russified) Lithuanians.

Further complicating the situation, there were two Polish factions with quite different views on creation of the modern state in Poland. One party, led by Roman Dmowski, saw modern Poland as an ethnic state, another, led by Józef Piłsudski, wished to rebuild the Polish–Lithuanian Commonwealth. Both parties were determined to take the Poles of Vilnius into the new state. Piłsudski attempted to rebuild the Grand Duchy of Lithuania in a canton structure, as part of the Międzymorze federation:

- Lithuania of Kaunas with Lithuanian language
- Lithuania of Vilnius or Central Lithuania with Polish language
- Lithuania of Minsk with Belarusian language

Eventually, Piłsudski's plan failed; it was opposed both by the Lithuanian government and by the Dmowski's faction in Poland. Stanisław Grabski, representative of Dmowski's faction, was in charge of the Treaty of Riga negotiations with the Soviet Union, in which they rejected the Soviet offer of territories needed for the Minsk canton (Dmowski preferred Poland that would be smaller, but with higher percentage of ethnic Poles). The inclusion of territories predominant with non-Poles would have weakened support for Dmowski.

=== Polish–Lithuanian War ===
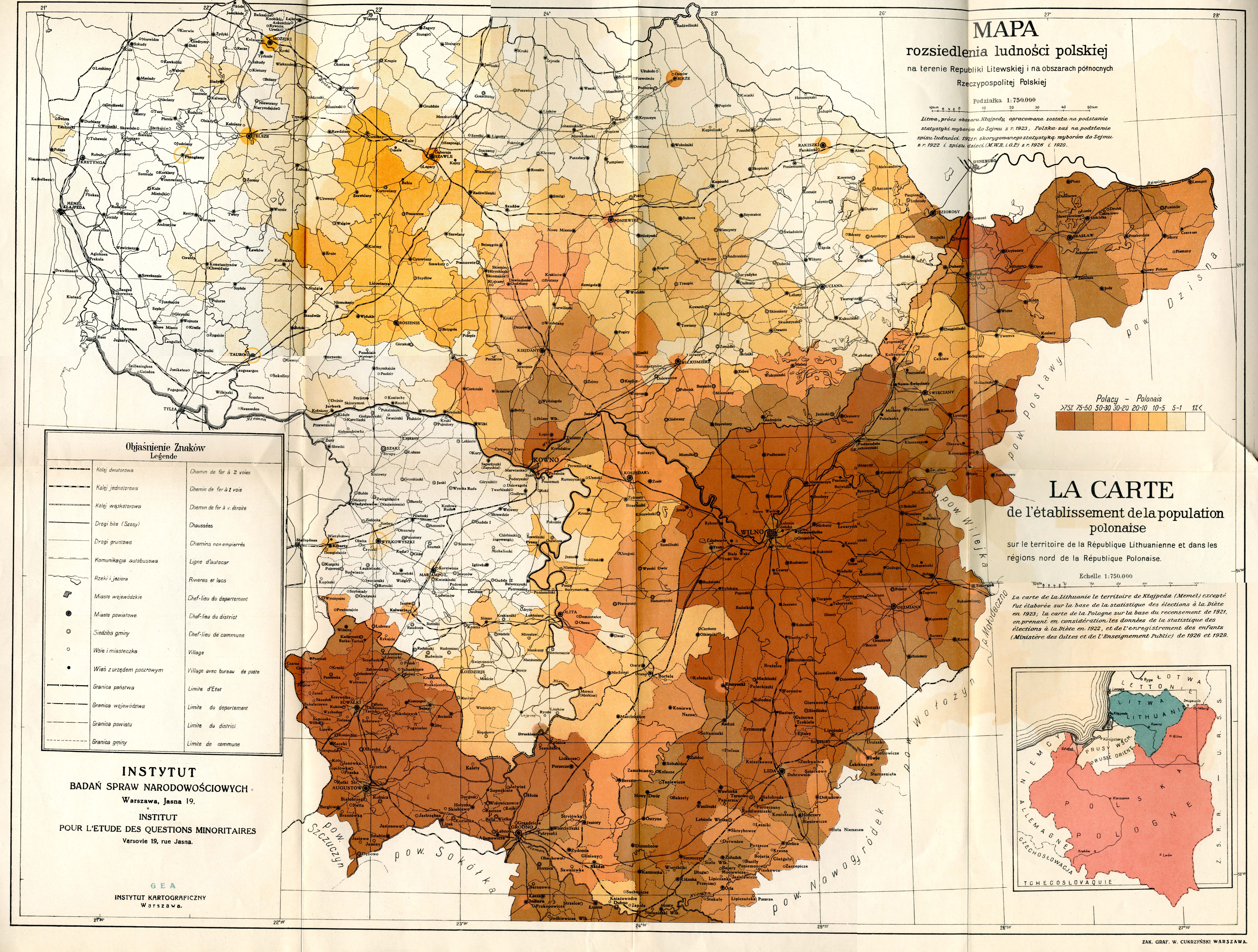
Interwar propaganda map showing the Polish territorial aspirations in both the so-called Central Lithuania as well as the Republic of Lithuania (see: 1919 Polish coup attempt in Lithuania) c. 1929.

At the end of World War I, the area of the former Grand Duchy of Lithuania was divided between the Second Polish Republic, the short-lived unrecognized Belarusian People's Republic, and the Republic of Lithuania. Following the start of the Polish–Soviet War, during the next two years, the control of Vilnius and its environs changed frequently. In 1919 the territory was briefly occupied by the Red Army, which defeated the local self-defense units, but shortly afterwards the Soviets were pushed back by the Polish Army. 1920 saw the Vilnius region occupied by the Red Army for the second time. However, when the Red Army was defeated in the Battle of Warsaw, the Soviets, knowing that they wouldn't be able to hold Vilnius, decided to hand it over to Lithuania. By making such a move, the Soviets hoped to intensify the Polish-Lithuanian dispute over the region.

The regular Polish–Lithuanian War broke out on 26 August 1920, when the Polish Army clashed with Lithuanian troops occupying Suwałki region during the Polish autumn offensive following the Battle of Warsaw. The League of Nations intervened and arranged negotiations in Suwałki. The League negotiated a cease-fire, signed on 7 October 7, placing the city of Vilnius in Lithuania. The Suwałki Agreement was to have taken effect at 12:00 on 10 October.

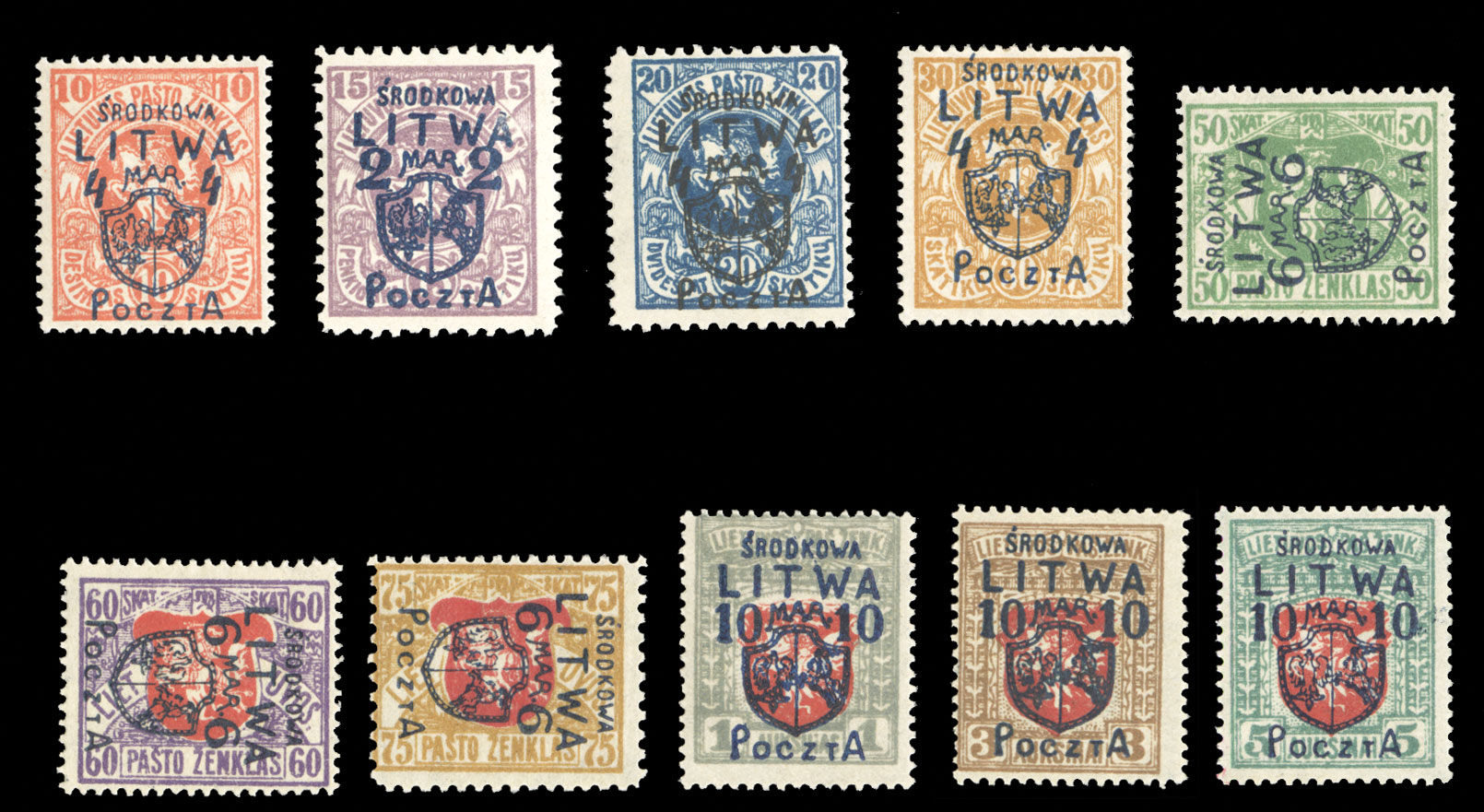
Lithuanian postage stamps with overprints of Central Lithuania (Środkowa Litwa), made in 1920

The Lithuanian authorities entered Vilnius in late August 1920. The Grinius cabinet rejected the proposal to hold a plebiscite to confirm the will of the region's inhabitants, knowing that a plebiscite would inevitably legitimize Polish claims to the region. His declaration was promptly accepted by the Seimas, for the percentage of Lithuanian population in Vilnius was very small. On 8 October, General Lucjan Żeligowski and the 1st Lithuanian-Belarusian Division numbering around 14,000 men, with local self-defense, launched the Żeligowski's Mutiny and engaged the Lithuanian 4th Infantry Regiment which promptly retreated. Upon the Polish advance, on October 8, the Lithuanian government left the city for Kaunas, and during withdrawal, meticulously destroyed telephone lines and rail between the two cities, which remained severed for a generation. Żeligowski entered Vilnius on 9 October, to enthusiastic cheers of the overwhelmingly Polish population of the city. The French and the British delegation decided to leave the matter in the hands of the League of Nations. On October 27, while the Żeligowski's campaign still continued outside Vilnius, the League called for a popular referendum in the disputed area, which was again rejected by the Lithuanian representation. Poland disclaimed all responsibility for the action, maintaining that Żeligowski had acted entirely on his own initiative. This version of the event was redefined in August 1923 when Piłsudski, speaking in public at a Vilnius theater, stated that the attack was undertaken by his direct order. Żeligowski, a native to Lithuania, proclaimed a new state, the Republic of Central Lithuania (Litwa Środkowa). According to historian Jerzy J. Lerski, it was a "puppet state" which the Lithuanian Republic refused to recognize.

The seat of Lithuanian government moved to Lithuania's second-largest city, Kaunas. Armed clashes between Kaunas and Central Lithuania continued for a few weeks, but neither side could gain a significant advantage. Due to the mediation efforts of the League of Nations, a new ceasefire was signed on November 21 and a truce six days later.

=== Founding of the Republic of Central Lithuania ===
On 12 October 1920, Żeligowski announced the creation of a provisional government. Soon the courts and the police were formed by his decree of 7 January 1921, and the civil rights of Central Lithuania were granted to all people who lived in the area on January 1, 1919, or for five years prior to August 1, 1914. The symbols of the state were a red flag with Polish White Eagle and Lithuanian Vytis. Its coat of arms was a mixture of Polish, Lithuanian and Vilnian symbols and resembled the Coat of arms of the Polish–Lithuanian Commonwealth.

Extensive diplomatic negotiations continued behind the scenes. Lithuania proposed creating a confederation of Baltic Western Lithuania (with Lithuanian as an official language) and Central Lithuania (with Polish as an official language). Poland added the condition that the new state must be also federated with Poland, pursuing Józef Piłsudski's goal of creating the Międzymorze Federation. Lithuanians rejected this condition. With nationalistic sentiments rising all over Europe, many Lithuanians were afraid that such a federation, resembling the Polish–Lithuanian Commonwealth from centuries ago, would be a threat to Lithuanian culture, as during the Commonwealth times many of the Lithuanian nobility was Polonized.

General elections in Central Lithuania were decreed to take place on 9 January, and the regulations governing this election were to be issued prior to 28 November 1920. However, due to the League of Nations mediation, and the Lithuanian boycott of the voting, the elections were postponed.

=== Mediation ===
Curzon lines, ignored by Poland during the struggle for Central Lithuania.

Selected demarcation lines during the struggle for central Lithuania.

Peace talks were held under the auspice of the League of Nations. The initial agreement was signed by both sides on 29 November 1920, and the talks started on 3 March 1921. The League of Nations considered the Polish proposal of a plebiscite on the future of Central Lithuania. As a compromise, the so-called "Hymans' plan" was proposed (named after Paul Hymans). The plan consisted of 15 points, among them were:

- Both sides guarantee each other's independence.
- Central Lithuania is incorporated into the Federation of Lithuania, composed of two cantons: Lithuanian-inhabited Samogitia and multi-ethnic (Belarusian, Tatar, Polish, Jewish and Lithuanian) Vilnius area. Both cantons will have separate governments, parliaments, official languages and a common federative capital in Vilnius.
- Lithuanian and Polish governments will create interstate commissions on both foreign affairs, trade and industry measures and local policies.
- Poland and Lithuania will sign a defensive alliance treaty.
- Poland will gain usage of ports in Lithuania.

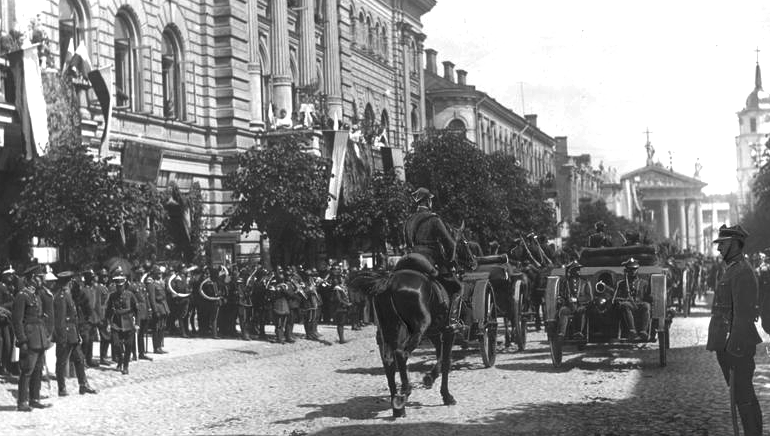
Polish military celebrates the incorporation of Vilnius Region in Poland, 1922.

The talks came to a halt when Poland demanded that a delegation from Central Lithuania (boycotted by Lithuania) be invited to Brussels. Hymans' proposal left Vilnius in Polish hands, which was unacceptable to Lithuania.

A new plan was presented to the governments of Lithuania and Poland in September 1921. It was basically a modification of "Hymans' plan", with the difference that the Klaipėda Region (the area in East Prussia north of the Neman River) was to be incorporated into Lithuania. However, both Poland and Lithuania openly criticized this revised plan and finally this turn of talks came to a halt as well.

=== Resolution ===
Ribbon of the Cross of Merit of the Army of Central Lithuania.

After the talks in Brussels failed, the tensions in the area grew. The most important issue was the huge army Central Lithuania fielded (27,000). General Lucjan Żeligowski decided to pass the power to the civil authorities and confirmed the date of the elections (8 January 1922). There was a significant electioneering propaganda campaign as Poles tried to win the support of other ethnic groups present in the area. The Polish government was also accused of various strong-arm policies (like the closing of Lithuanian newspapers or election violations like not asking for a valid document from a voter). The elections were boycotted by Lithuanians, most of the Jews and some Belarusians. Poles were the only major ethnic group out of which the majority of people voted.

The elections were not recognized by Lithuania. Polish factions, which gained control over the parliament (Sejm) of the Republic (the Sejm of Central Lithuania), on February 20 passed the request of incorporation into Poland. The request was accepted by the Polish Sejm on 22 March 1922.

All of the Republic's territory was eventually incorporated into the newly formed Wilno Voivodeship. Lithuania declined to accept the Polish authority over the area. Instead, it continued to treat the so-called Vilnius Region as part of its own territory and the city itself as its constitutional capital, with Kaunas being only a temporary seat of government. The dispute over the Vilnius region resulted in much tensions in the Polish–Lithuanian relations in the interwar period.

== Aftermath ==
Alfred Erich Senn noted that if Poland had not prevailed in the Polish–Soviet War, Lithuania would have been invaded by the Soviets, and would never have experienced two decades of independence. Despite the Soviet–Lithuanian Peace Treaty of 1920, Lithuania was very close to being invaded by the Soviets in summer 1920 and being forcibly incorporated into that state, and only the Polish victory derailed this plan.

After the Molotov–Ribbentrop Pact and the Soviet invasion of Poland in 1939, Vilnius and its surroundings of up to 30 kilometres were given to Lithuania in accordance with the Soviet–Lithuanian Mutual Assistance Treaty of 10 October 1939, and Vilnius again became the capital of Lithuania. However, in 1940, Lithuania was annexed by the Soviet Union, forcing the country to become the Lithuanian SSR. Since the restoration of Lithuanian independence in 1991, the city's status as Lithuania's capital has been internationally recognized.

== See also ==
- Army of Central Lithuania
- History of Vilnius
- Vilnius Voivodeship
- Polish National-Territorial Region
- The 1922 Republic of Central Lithuania general election
- List of sovereign states in 1922
