= Bellona Publishing House =

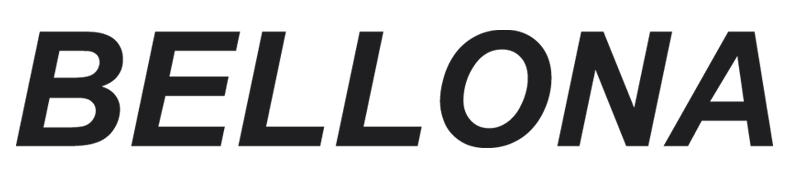
- Status: Active
- Country of origin: Poland
- Headquarters location: Warsaw
- Key people: Henryk Samsonowicz, Lech Wyszczelski, Tadeusz Panecki
- Publication types: Books, journal
- Nonfiction topics: Military history
- Official website: www.bellona.pl

Bellona Publishing House (Polish: Wydawnictwo Bellona, formerly also Dom Wydawniczy Bellona) is a private publishing house based in Warsaw, Poland. It was created in 1990 from restructuring of the state-run Wydawnictwo MON. It specialises in books on military history. Among the authors who published with Bellona are academic historians Henryk Samsonowicz, Lech Wyszczelski, Leszek Moczulski, and Tadeusz Panecki as well as journalists and writers like Krzysztof Daukszewicz, Grzegorz Miecugow, Magdalena Kozak. Bellona issues more than 300 books yearly. It is also the publisher of Mówią Wieki, a monthly historical magazine established in 1958.

== Wydawnictwo MON ==
Wydawnictwo MON (Wydawnictwo Ministerstwa Obrony Narodowej, lit. Publishing House of the Ministry of National Defense) was founded in 1947 and until 1952 its official title was Wydawnictwo Ministerstwa Obrony Narodowej „Prasa Wojskowa" (lit. Publishing House of the Ministry of National Defense "Military Press"). It released books related to military subjects, such as memoirs of veterans or monographs on battles or military units.

In 1976 the publishing house received the Commanders Cross of the Polonia Restituta.

Around 1989–1990 it was restructured into the Bellona Publishing House. In 2007, it was commercialized as Bellona Spółka Akcyjna, owned by the State Treasury. In 2018, after the branches had been separated into separate companies, Bellona SA was transformed into Bellona Sp. z o. o., wholly owned by Dressler Dublin.

== Exterlan links ==
- Official website (in Polish)
