= Konstantinas Žukas =

Lithuanian military officer (1884–1962)

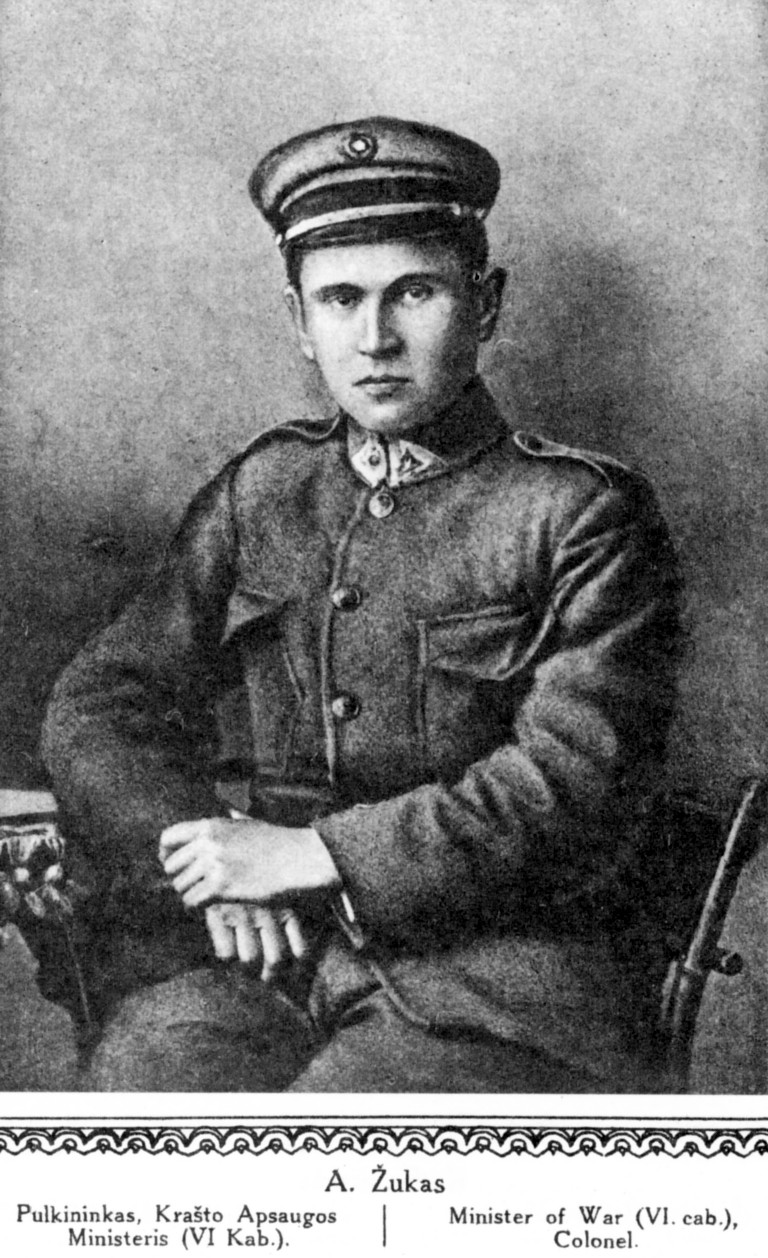

Minister of Defence of Lithuania
- In office 19 June 1920 – 7 April 1921
- President: Aleksandras Stulginskis
- Prime Minister: Kazys Grinius
- Preceded by: Pranas Liatukas
- Succeeded by: Jonas Šimkus

Chief of Defense of Lithuania
- In office 7 July 1920 – 7 April 1921
- Preceded by: Jonas Galvydis-Bykauskas
- Succeeded by: Juozas Kraucevičius

Personal details
- Born: 6 January 1885 Kaunas, Russian Empire
- Died: 22 January 1962 (aged 77) Cleveland, Ohio, United States
- Resting place: Calvary Cemetery in Cleveland
- Party: Lithuanian Popular Peasants' Union
- Education: Vilnius Military School

Military service
- Allegiance: Russian Empire; Lithuania
- Branch: Imperial Russian Army; Lithuanian Armed Forces
- Years of service: 1906–1925
- Rank: Colonel
- Commands: 1st Reserve Battalion; Lithuanian Army
- Battles/wars: World War I; Battle of Galicia; Polish–Lithuanian War

Konstantinas Žukas (6 January 1885 – 22 January 1962) was a Lithuanian colonel who was the Minister of Defence from 19 June 1920 to 7 April 1921. At the same time, he was the chief commander of the Lithuanian Army during the Polish–Lithuanian War.

Žukas learned to operate a telegraph informally and started working as railway telegraphist at the age of 12. He moved to work for the railway in Achinsk and Krasnoyarsk, but lost his job due to his involvement in the Russian Revolution of 1905. He then volunteered to the Russian Imperial Army and attended Vilnius Military School. He served as communications officer in the 121st Penza Infantry Regiment and the 31st Infantry Division. In 1918, he returned to Lithuania and joined the Lithuanian Army in February 1919. He became commander of the 1st Reserve Battalion and the front between the border with Germany and Merkinė. In this capacity, Žukas dealt with the Sejny Uprising which forced the Lithuanians to retreat behind the Foch Line in September 1919.

In April 1920, Žukas was elected to the Constituent Assembly of Lithuania as a member of the Lithuanian Popular Peasants' Union. Žukas became the minister of defence in the government of Prime Minister Kazys Grinius in June and supreme commander of the Lithuanian Army in July 1920. Žukas negotiated with the Soviets regarding their withdrawal from Vilnius which was recognized to Lithuania by the Soviet–Lithuanian Peace Treaty. He also negotiated with Poland in an attempt at preventing hostilities in the Polish–Lithuanian War. The Lithuanian Wars of Independence ended in November 1920, but Lithuania lost both Vilnius Region and Suwałki Region to the Second Polish Republic.

Žukas worked to establish the Higher Officers' Courses (opened in April 1921) and the Kaunas War Museum (opened in February 1921). On 7 April 1921, he resigned from both the command of the army and the Ministry of Defence. He then served as the second assistant to the Chief of the General Staff, commander of the 4th Border Division, and chief of staff of the 2nd military district. He resigned from the military in 1925. In 1944, he retreated to Germany and emigrated to the United States in 1949. He died in January 1962 in Cleveland, Ohio.

== Biography ==
=== Railway telegraph ===
Žukas was born on 6 January 1885 [O.S. 25 December 1884] in Kaunas into a family of poor city residents. He attended a primary school in Kaunas and was an excellent student who received the highest grades, but was not admitted to Kaunas Gymnasium because he was not from a noble family. In 1896, his parents moved to Obeliai where his father worked as a salesman of vodka for the state monopolist. There Žukas joined a church choir organized by Mikas Petrauskas. He was informally taught to operate the telegraph by a director of the railway station. Despite being just 12 years old, he worked at the station as a telegraph operator.

In fall 1899, Russian general Ivan Borkovsky visited the station which was on the Saint Petersburg–Warsaw railway and noticed the young but talented Žukas. Borkovsky invited Žukas to work for the Russian railway in Siberia where neither his low-born status nor young age was an obstacle. Žukas then worked as a telegraphist in Achinsk and Krasnoyarsk. Since he earned a decent wage (420 rubles per year) and cost of living was much lower, his family (mother, sister, and later father) also moved to Krasnoyarsk. Žukas was quickly promoted to senior telegraphist and his salary was raised to 90 rules per month.

During the Russian Revolution of 1905, Žukas was elected chairman of the railway workers' union in Krasnoyarsk. He later worked at a telegraph agency – he collected news from other railway workers' unions and committees and published a bulletin every two to three days. In August 1905, Žukas became secretary of a joint revolutionary committee of cities along the Trans-Siberian Railway. In December 1905, the revolutionary committee clashed with soldiers loyal to the Tsarist regime. Žukas along with several hundred others was arrested, but he was released after a few days.

=== Russian Imperial Army ===
Fearing further arrests and persecutions, Žukas returned to Lithuania in January 1906. He passed the graduation exams of Kaunas Gymnasium externally so that he could volunteer for the Russian Imperial Army. He likely joined because volunteers were treated better than conscripts. He joined the army in October 1906 and was assigned to the 110th Kama Infantry Regiment stationed in Šančiai. His superiors quickly recognized his potential and sent him to study at Vilnius Military School in August 1907. Upon his graduation in August 1910, he was promoted to podporuchik and assigned to the communications section of the 121st Penza Infantry Regiment in Kharkov. According to his memoirs, Žukas wanted to continue studying at a military academy, but was told that he could not be accepted because of his Catholic faith.

At the start of the First World War, Žukas maintained communications in the Battle of Galicia. He was assigned to the 31st Infantry Division as communications chief in October 1915. After the February Revolution, Žukas was elected chairman of the division's soldiers committee and was reelected four times. In August 1917, the division was moved to the Romanian Front and placed in reserve. After the October Revolution, Žukas submitted his resignation from the army, but it was rejected. He then asked to be transferred to the Polish Legions which was granted. In February 1918, he departed to Voronezh where he lived with some relatives. In May, after the Red Army announced mobilization, Žukas decided to return to Lithuania.

=== 1st Reserve Battalion ===
In summer 1918, Žukas returned to Lithuania and lived in Raseiniai. He joined a local 12-member committee that proclaimed Raseiniai Republic. He organized and led a local police force of about 30 men to maintain public order. However, in early December he became seriously ill with typhoid fever. Upon recover, and against doctor's orders, he traveled to Kaunas where he joined the Lithuanian Army as a volunteer on 15 February 1919. He was assigned to the 1st Infantry Regiment as chief of communications in Marijampolė. In March 1919, the regiment was ordered to deploy to Alytus. However, a battalion was left behind and Žukas became its commander. In April, the battalion was officially named the 1st Reserve Battalion (later reorganized into the 10th Infantry Regiment). Žukas worked on training new recruits, purchasing weapons from Germans, organizing basic provisions for the new army. He also had jurisdiction over kommandaturas in Alytus, Sejny, and Marijampolė.

In August 1919, the Suwałki Region became contested between Poland and Lithuania (see: Polish–Lithuanian War). Trying to avoid direct hostilities, the Conference of Ambassadors drew a couple of demarcation lines between Poland and Lithuania. The Foch Line required Lithuanian forces to retreat from Sejny. When Lithuanians refused, Polish irregular forces started the Sejny Uprising. On 24 August, Žukas was appointed commander of the front between the border with Germany and Merkinė. In this capacity, Žukas held several rounds of negotiations with the Poles. In the end, Lithuanians agreed to withdraw behind the Foch Line by 7 September.

In October 1919, Žukas had to deal with the issue of unpaid soldier wages. He took matters to his own hands. Using imperial Russian law which was still in effect at the time, Žukas demanded that the richest local residents bought 200,000 German marks worth of government obligations. When the residents refused, Žukas arrested 83 Jews from Marijampolė on 18 October. While it caused a scandal and protests from English observers, the measure was successful in raising more than 500,000 marks. In addition, Žukas dealt with many issues unrelated to the military, including arresting smugglers and communist activists. He became known as a strict and demanding officer. Žukas was promoted to major on 7 October 1919 and to lieutenant colonel on 24 March 1920.

=== Ministry of Defence ===
In April 1920, Žukas was elected to the Constituent Assembly of Lithuania as a member of the Lithuanian Popular Peasants' Union. Initially, he wanted to refuse the mandate as he was not too interested in politics and believed that he was more useful in the army. However, party leadership convinced him to leave the 1st Reserve Battalion and move to Kaunas to work at the assembly which convened on 15 May 1920. In the assembly, Žukas was elected to the commission of national defence and became chairman of the commission on complaints and petitions.

On 19 June 1920, Žukas became the minister of defence in the government of Prime Minister Kazys Grinius. He centralized the procurement process and trimmed staff of the ministry and unit staffs. He was strict and demanded discipline from both officers and privates. Due to his personality and work style, he was disliked by and quarreled with several senior officers, including Pranas Liatukas, Antanas Merkys, Kazys Ladiga, and Silvestras Žukauskas. According to memoirs of Stasys Raštikis, junior officers approved of Žukas. As minister of defence, Žukas had to respond to several inquiries by members of the Constituent Assembly regarding various reported excesses of kommandants and other military personnel.

In June 1920, the Lithuanian government learned of the planned Soviet offensive in the Polish–Soviet War which presented an opportunity for Lithuanians to attack Poland and reclaim the Suwałki Region. However, the government resolved to maintain strict neutrality. As the situation became more unstable, Žukas became the acting supreme commander of the Lithuanian Army on 7 July 1920. On 12 July, the Soviet–Lithuanian Peace Treaty was concluded. Soviet Russia recognized Vilnius to Lithuania and Žukas negotiated with the Soviets regarding their withdrawal from the city. On 23 July, the Constituent Assembly enacted martial law which was proposed by Žukas.

On 26 August 1920, Žukas negotiated with a Polish delegation, led by Colonel Mieczysław Mackiewicz, in an attempt at preventing hostilities between Poland and Lithuania. Žukas held firm and refused to negotiate military matters without a clear political Polish–Lithuanian border that would be respected after the war. Hostilities erupted and towns in the Suwałki Region changed hands a few times. However, Lithuanians suffered a major defeat in the Battle of Sejny on 22 September and lost Vilnius to Żeligowski's Mutiny on 9 October 1920. Hostilities and the Lithuanian Wars of Independence ended in November 1920.

Žukas worked to establish the Higher Officers' Courses (opened in April 1921) and the Kaunas War Museum (opened in February 1921). On 7 April 1921, he resigned from both the command of the army and the Ministry of Defence. According to the memoirs of Rapolas Skipitis, Žukas resigned because he attempted to expose a smuggling operation of Juozas Purickis, Minister of Foreign Affairs. On 30 June 1921, Žukas also resigned from the Constituent Assembly.

=== Further military service ===
On 14 June 1921, Žukas became the second assistant to Maksimas Katche, Chief of the General Staff. He was responsible for mobilization and formation section, military attaché officers abroad, and general administration of the General Staff. When Katche was on a month-long vacation in September–October 1921 and February–March 1922, Žukas was the acting Chief of the General Staff. Further, Žukas taught military statutes, military education and psychology at Kaunas War School and Higher Officers' Courses. He was elected to the board of the Military Science Society. He participated in the society's initiative to edit Lithuanian military statutes and completed the Statute of the Internal Service of the Lithuanian Armed Forces by 1923.

In March 1922, Žukas was appointed commander of the 4th Border Division (stationed in Alytus) and was tasked with organizing the Border Guard Army. On 17 April 1923, Žukas was promoted to colonel. It became apparent that military units were not well suited for border protection. Therefore, the Border Guard Army was disbanded and the border protection was delegated to the Ministry of Internal Affairs. On 31 December 1923, Žukas was appointed chief of staff of the 2nd military district. In his memoirs, he described this post as the most peaceful period of his life.

Žukas resigned from the military on 5 December 1925. Reportedly, he was forced to resign by Kazys Ladiga, the Chief of the General Staff since May 1925.

=== Later life ===
After the military, Žukas lived in Kaunas. He received a state pension and worked as a representative of several foreign firms in Lithuania. He continued to teach at Kaunas War School and Higher Officers' Courses until October 1928. He was dismissed from his teaching position because of a public outburst during the trial of artillery captain Vladimiras Okulič-Kazarinas who shot and killed Liudas Noreika, the former Minister of Justice, after a card game. Žukas passionately defended Okulič-Kazarinas and even claimed it would be his honor to join the defendant's bench. In 1935, Žukas petitioned to return to teaching, even if he received no compensation, but was refused.

In 1944, Žukas retreated ahead of the advancing Red Army to Germany and lived a displaced person camps. In 1949, he emigrated to the United States and settled in Cleveland. He continued to be involved in Lithuanian activities, participating in the Lithuanian Veterans' Union Ramovė and joining a local group of the Lithuanian Popular Peasants' Union.

Žukas died on 22 January 1962 and was buried at Calvary Cemetery in Cleveland.

== Publications ==
A volume of his memoirs Žvilgsnis į praeitį (A Look Into the Past) was published in 1959 (republished in independent Lithuania in 1992).

He contributed articles to several periodicals, including Kardas and Aidai. He published several articles in journal Mūsų žinynas, most notably a lengthy study-textbook on military pedagogy in 1926. Together with Vaclovas Biržiška, Žukas is considered pioneer of military pedagogy in Lithuanian military.

== Awards ==
- Order of Saint Anna (2nd, 3rd, and 4th degrees)
- Order of Saint Stanislaus (2nd and 3rd degrees)
- Medal for the 10th Anniversary of the Liberation War (Latvia, 1929)

== Bibliography ==
- Bitautas, Algis; Tamošaitis, Mindaugas (2016). "Konstantinas Žukas" (PDF). In Tamošaitis, Mindaugas; Bitautas, Algis; Svarauskas, Artūras (eds.). Lietuvos Respublikos 1918–1940 m. vyriausybių ministrų biografinis žodynas (in Lithuanian). Vilnius: Mokslo ir enciklopedijų leidybos centras. pp. 510–513. ISBN 978-5-420-01778-4.
- Iliškienė, Živilė (15 February 2011). "Konstantinas Žukas". Bibliografinė duomenų bazė "Žymūs Lietuvos žmonės" (in Lithuanian). Lietuvos nacionalinė Martyno Mažvydo biblioteka.
- Janulaitienė, Nijolė (2006). "Vaclovo Biržiškos ir Konstantino Žuko karinės pedagogikos idėjos ugdymo mokslo kaitos kontekste" (PDF). Tiltai (in Lithuanian). 4: 1–17. ISSN 1392-3137.
- Surgailis, Gintautas (1992). Lietuvos kariuomenės vadai (in Lithuanian). Vilnius: Mintis. ISBN 5-417-00513-4.
- Tijūnėlienė, Ona (2007). "Konstantinas Žukas: nuo telegrafininko iki vyriausiojo kariuomenės vado ir krašto apsaugos ministro". In Janulaitienė, Nijolė; Puzinavičius, Bronius (eds.). Karinis rengimas ir ugdymas Lietuvoje (PDF) (in Lithuanian). Vilnius: Generolo Jono Žemaičio Lietuvos karo akademija. ISBN 978-9955-423-61-4.
- Truska, Liudas (2006). "Žukas Konstantinas". In Ragauskas, Aivas; Tamošaitis, Mindaugas (eds.). Lietuvos Steigiamojo Seimo (1920–1922 metų) narių biografinis žodynas. Didysis Lietuvos parlamentarų biografinis žodynas (in Lithuanian). Vol. 2. Vilnius: Vilniaus pedagoginis universitetas. pp. 447–449. ISBN 9789955201465.
- Žalienė, Dalia, ed. (2008). Lietuvos kariuomenės karininkai 1918–1953 (in Lithuanian). Vol. VIII. Vilnius: Lietuvos nacionalinis muziejus. ISBN 978-9955-415-89-3.
