= 4th Infantry Division (Lithuania) =

- 4-oji pėstininkų divizija
- Active: 1920–1924
- Country: Lithuania
- Branch: Lithuanian Army
- Engagements: Lithuanian Wars of Independence; Polish–Lithuanian War

The 4th Infantry Division (Lithuanian: 4-oji pėstininkų divizija) was an infantry division of the Lithuanian Army. It was formed in 1920, during the Lithuanian Wars of Independence, and was disbanded in 1924.

== History ==
The 4th Infantry Division, formed on 14 October 1920, comprised 3 infantry regiments.

Although the largest battles of the Polish–Lithuanian War ended in November 1920, skirmishes continued in the Polish–Lithuanian Neutral Strip that was established by the League of Nations following the Treaty of Kaunas.

The 4th Infantry Division consisted of the 10th, 11th, and 12th Infantry Regiments, the 4th Artillery Regiment, and two squadrons of the 1st Cavalry Regiment. The divisional commander in late 1920 and 1921 was Lt. Col. Kazys Ladyga. The division guarded the area from the Lithuanian border with Germany at Lake Vištytis to the village of Jakėnai. The division headquarters was in Alytus.

In 1924, following the division of Lithuanian territory into three military districts, with an infantry division stationed in each, the 4th Infantry Division was disbanded.

=== Transformation into the Border Guard (May–December 1923) ===
On May 7, 1923, the Minister of National Defense ordered the formation of the Border Guard Division from the 4th Infantry Division and the 1st Border Regiment, under Lt. Col. Konstantinas Žukas, based on a resolution of the ministerial Cabinet. The 2nd Border Regiment was dissolved while the new division was given over to the Ministry of Internal Affairs. The 10th, 11th, and 12th Infantry Regiments were renamed 2nd, 3rd, and 4th Border Regiments, respectively. Only the light machine guns remained as the heavy machine gun companies were dissolved. But this restructuring was equally ineffectual. In his memoirs, Žukas stated that the border guard's sparse patrol along a long border was unable to stop contraband from entering from either side.

== Aftermath ==
From 15 December 1923, the Border Guard Division was down sized to the Border Guard Brigade, and the regiments into Border Guard Battalions. On January 1, 1924, it was completely disbanded. Border protection was transferred to the Border Police (subordinate to the Ministry of Internal Affairs) and 150 officers and non-commissioned officers as well as 1,460 soldiers transferred from the brigade to the Border Police, while others were transferred to army units. The Ministry of National Defence also gave much weaponry to the Border Police, which included 4,987 rifles, 607 carbines, 66 machine guns, 101 rocket-propelled grenades, 258 revolvers, 627 swords, 239 telephones, 297 wagons and more.

== Sources ==
- Surgailis, Gintautas (2024). Lietuvos kariuomenės istorija (PDF) (in Lithuanian). Vol. I (Part 1). Vilnius: Generolo Jono Žemaičio Lietuvos karo akademija. ISBN 978-609-8277-55-5.
- Lesčius, Vytautas (2007). "Lenkų provokacijos neutralioje zonoje 1921–1923 m." Karo archyvas (in Lithuanian). 22. Generolo Jono Žemaičio Lietuvos karo akademija. ISSN 1392-6489.

=== Universal Lithuanian Encyclopedia ===
- Kisinas, Eugenijus Simonas (2018). "Divizija". Universal Lithuanian Encyclopedia (in Lithuanian).
- Spečiūnas, Vytautas; Knezys, Stasys; Gaidys, Arvydas (2018). "Lietuvos ginkluotosios pajėgos 1918–1940". Universal Lithuanian Encyclopedia (in Lithuanian).
