= 12th Infantry Regiment (Lithuania) =

Former Lithuanian Army formation (1919–24)

12th Kaunas Infantry Regiment
- 12-asis Kauno pėstininkų pulkas
- Active: October 14, 1920 – March 1, 1924
- Country: Lithuania
- Branch: Lithuanian Army
- Type: Infantry
- Anniversaries: October 14

The 12th Kaunas Infantry Regiment (Lithuanian: 12-asis Kauno pėstininkų pulkas) was an infantry regiment that served in the Lithuanian Army from 1920 to 1924. In 1923, it was reformed into the 4th Border Regiment (Lithuanian: 4-asis pasienio pulkas) and later that year into the 4th Separate Border Battalion (Lithuanian: 4-asis atskiras pasienio batalionas), both of which were tasked with the protection of the Lithuanian demarcation line with Poland and to prevent the illegal movement of persons and smuggling across the border.

== 1920 ==
The regiment was founded on 14 October 1920. The regiment's core were parts of the Military Commandant's (Lithuanian: Karo komendantūra) companies of Suvalkai and Eglainė. The regiment was part of the 4th Infantry Division. By November, the regiment is in Vilkaviškis and protects the Foch Line from Vištytis to Kalvarija.

== 1921 ==
In 1921, the regiment was moved to Veiveriai district. In November 1921, the regiment moves to Alytus. From 1921, the regiment feast was on October 14, its founding date.

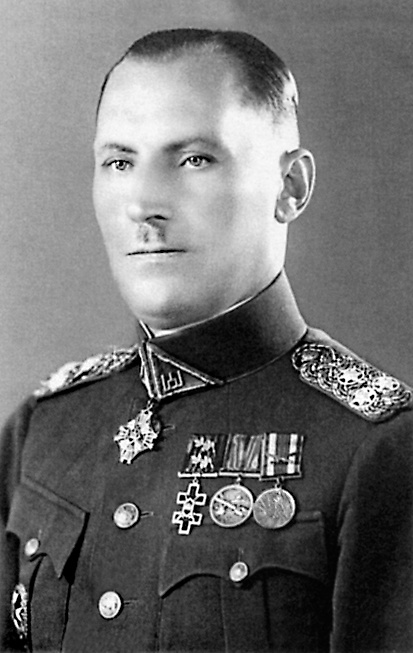
Colonel Vincas Šaudzis. Picture taken sometime from 1933 to 1940.

== 1923 ==
According to different sources, the regiment was reformed into the 4th Border Regiment on 2 or 12 May 1923. The other infantry regiments of the 4th Infantry Division, the 10th and 11th, were also renamed, to the 2nd and 3rd Border Regiments, respectively. The regiment was part of the Border Division, while the battalion was part of the Border Brigade. On 15 or 30 November 1923, it is made into the 4th Separate Border Battalion and is relocated to Lyduokiai. On 21 December 1923, the battalion moves to Ukmergė. The battalion is disbanded on 1 March 1924.

== Commander ==
The regiment's commander was Colonel Vincas Šaudzis.

== Sources ==
- Steponaitis, Vytautas (1939). "Dvyliktas pėst. pulkas". In Biržiška, Vaclovas (ed.). Lietuviškoji enciklopedija (in Lithuanian). Vol. 7: Drugiai - Fazmos. Kaunas: Spaudos Fondas. p. 309.
- Vydrina, Elena (2008). "lcva fondo 1331 pažyma". www.archyvai.lt (in Lithuanian).
- Jasulaitis, Vytautas (2022). "Dvyliktasis pėstininkų pulkas". Visuotinė lietuvių enciklopedija (in Lithuanian).
- Balaišis, Algis (1998). "Lietuvos valstybės sienos apsauga 1918–1940 metais". Karo archyvas (in Lithuanian). Vol. 15, no. 1.

=== Books ===
- Lesčius, Vytautas (2004). Lietuvos Kariuomenė Nepriklausomybės Kovose 1918–1920 (PDF) (in Lithuanian). Vilnius: Generolo Jono Žemaičio Lietuvos karo akademija. ISBN 9955-423-23-4.
- Ruzgas, Vincas, ed. (1932). "VIII. Krašto apsauga". Visa Lietuva: Informacinė knyga 1931 m. (in Lithuanian). Kaunas: Spaudos Fondas.
