= 12th Infantry =

12th Infantry may refer to:

- 12th Infantry Division (disambiguation)
- 12th Infantry Brigade (disambiguation)
- 12th Infantry Regiment (disambiguation)

== See also ==
- 12th (disambiguation)
