= 1919 Polish coup attempt in Lithuania =

1919 Polish coup d'état attempt in Lithuania
Date	August – September 1919
Location	Kaunas, Lithuania
Result	Coup discovered, Polish plotters arrested by Lithuanian authorities

Belligerents
(Second Polish Republic) Polish Military Organization, Lithuanian branch	Lithuania

Commanders and leaders
Józef Piłsudski; Leon Wasilewski; Tadeusz Kasprzycki; Stanisław Narutowicz; Jurgis Aukštuolaitis	Mykolas Sleževičius

Casualties and losses
- Many PMO members in Lithuania arrested, 117 put on trial

The Polish coup d'état attempt in Lithuania refers to a failed attempt by Polish Chief of State Józef Piłsudski to overthrow the existing Lithuanian government of Prime Minister Mykolas Sleževičius, and install a pro-Polish cabinet that would agree to a union with Poland. The Polish intelligence agency, the Polish Military Organization (PMO), was to carry out the coup d'etat, planned to be implemented in August 1919. The coup was designed to seem to be an initiative by local Lithuanians aiming to free their government of German influence. The PMO hoped to rely on the assistance of sympathetic Lithuanian activists. They were thwarted by the lack of cooperation and the unwillingness of sufficient number of Lithuanians to support the Polish cause.

After the Sejny Uprising, a Polish revolt against the Lithuanian authorities in one of the disputed border regions, Lithuanian intelligence intensified its investigation of the Polish minority and sympathizers in Lithuania, and uncovered the planned coup. The Lithuanians, not knowing the membership of the PMO, arrested numerous Polish activists and destabilized the PMO network enough to prevent the coup attempt. Later the full membership list was obtained and the PMO in Lithuania was dissolved. The coup further strained Polish–Lithuanian relations.

== Background ==
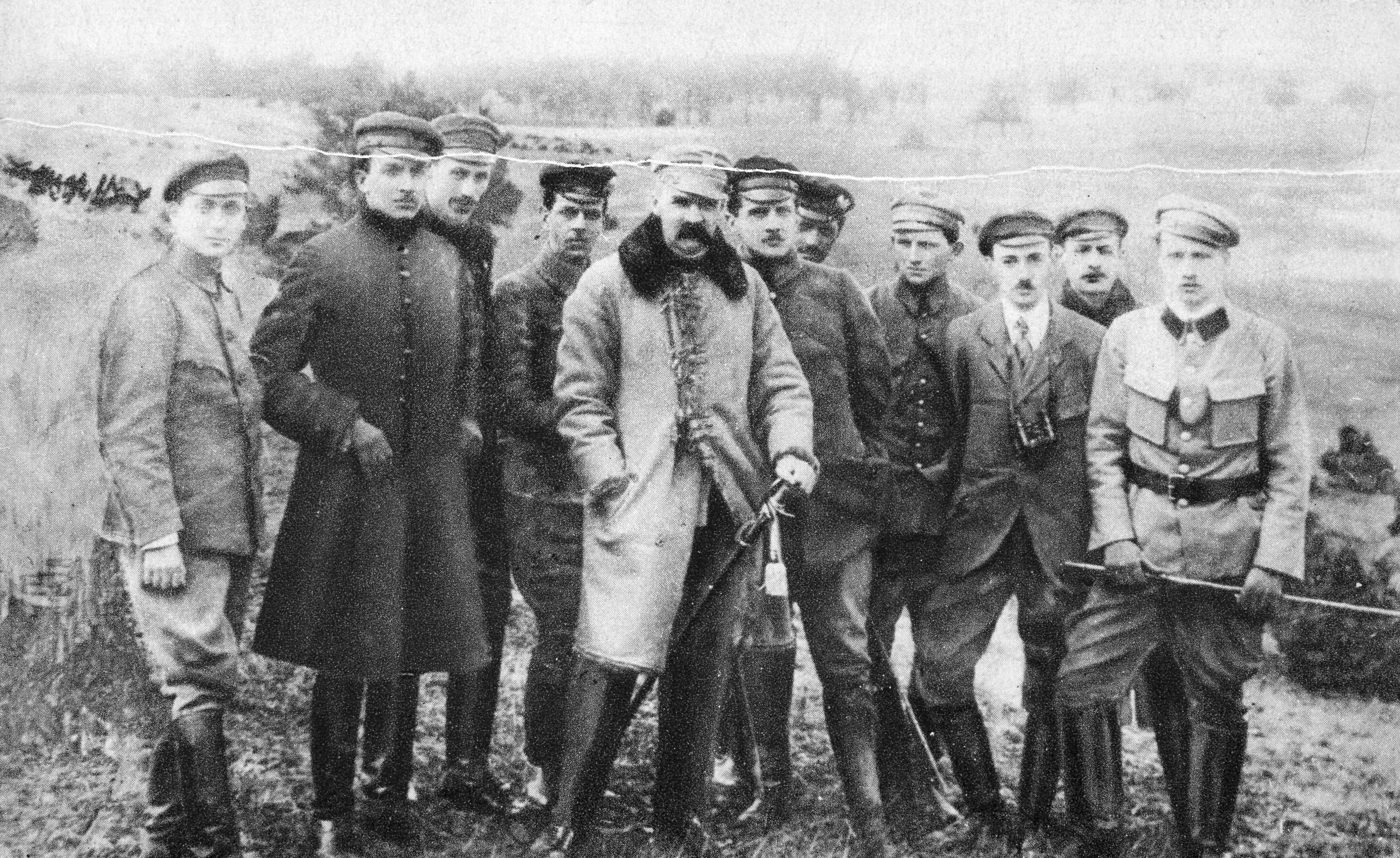
Józef Piłsudski with Supreme Command of Polish Military Organisation in 1917

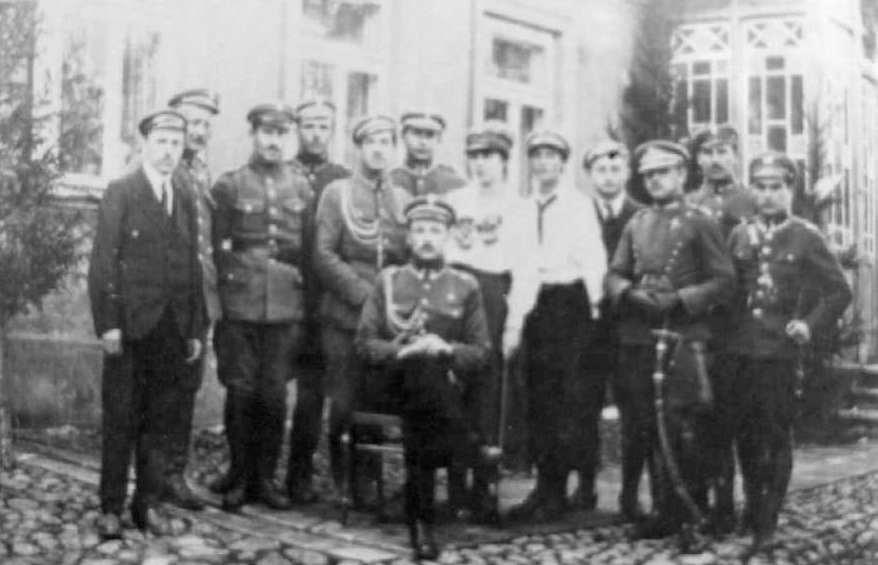
Lt. Adam Rudnicki, leader of the Sejny Uprising, and his colleagues. August 1919

Poland and Lithuania formed one state, the Polish–Lithuanian Commonwealth, from the Union of Lublin in 1569 to the Third Partition in 1795. Both Poland and Lithuania regained their independence in the aftermath of World War I, but both soon became engaged in territorial disputes over the Suwałki and Vilnius Regions. During the Polish–Soviet War, Poland launched an offensive against the Soviet Union and captured Vilnius (Wilno) during the Vilna offensive in April 1919. Lithuanians described Vilnius as their historical capital and an integral part of the ethnographic Lithuania, while to the Poles, because of its large Polish population, it was a Polish city. Poland's Chief of State Józef Piłsudski sought a union with Lithuania in hopes of reviving the old Polish–Lithuanian Commonwealth (see Międzymorze federation). The Lithuanians believed they would lose their sovereignty under the proposed federation and wanted their own national state. Although Polish–Lithuanian relations were not immediately hostile, they grew worse as each side refused to compromise.

As tensions rose, Lithuania asked the Allied Supreme Council to intervene, and it proposed two demarcation lines to prevent open hostilities, drawn in June and July 1919 (the second one was known as the Foch Line). However, Poland ignored both lines and advanced deeper into the Lithuanian-controlled territory. Faced with pressure from the Entente, Polish Chief of State Józef Piłsudski, who was significantly involved in planning of the coup, did not want open Polish–Lithuanian hostilities, which could lead to much bloodshed and even greater tensions between Poland and Lithuania. Instead, since he thought there were enough Polish sympathizers in Lithuania to stage a coup d'état, he decided to plan one to topple the Lithuanian government.

== Preparations ==
The planning began mid-July 1919. At the time Poland signed a ceasefire in the Polish–Ukrainian War; Lithuania was invaded by the Bermontians from the north and the Saxon Volunteers were leaving the Lithuanian Army. Piłsudski was planning to use a network of the Polish Military Organization (PMO), an underground organization he created during World War I for diversionary and intelligence operations-like purposes. On 31 July, Piłsudski and Polish diplomat Leon Wasilewski arrived at Vilnius, then controlled by Poland. Piłsudski's visit had no clear explanation. He later said that he arrived to negotiate with Lithuanians, led by Augustinas Voldemaras, while Lithuanian historian Vytautas Lesčius suggests he was holding talks with pro-Polish estate owners from the Vilnius Region. On 3 August, Wasilewski arrived at Kaunas, the temporary capital of Lithuania, to negotiate with Prime Minister Mykolas Sleževičius. The Polish mission declared that Poland had no plans to annex Lithuania and proposed a plebiscite in the contested territories, allowing local inhabitants to determine their future. The Lithuanians replied that the disputed territories were an integral part of Lithuania and rejected the idea of a plebiscite. Negotiations broke down and Wasilewski left Kaunas on 7 August. The negotiations were then used to evaluate viability of the coup, the preparedness of the PMO, and the attitude of Lithuanian diplomats towards a union with Poland.

After the failure of Wasilewski's diplomatic mission, Polish newspapers increased their anti-Lithuanian propaganda. They said that the Council of Lithuania was a pro-German puppet, ignoring popular wishes for a union with Poland as such union would break German influence in the state. The Polish media further reported on growing antigovernmental sentiment among the Lithuanians. This information was in line with the Polish plans to present the coup as an initiative by the local population to free Lithuania from German domination. While the plotters counted on military intervention by regular Polish troops, the Polish government maintained it had not inspired the coup. The official goal of the Polish plan was to "1) create an independent Lithuania, powerful, truly democratic, connected voluntarily with Poland in a union, with as much internal autonomy as possible and 2) acceptance of the Polish minority in Lithuania as a partner in the Lithuanian government and recognition of the Polish language as equal to the Lithuanian language in Lithuania."

The PMO recruited Lithuanian activists Stanisław Narutowicz, Juozas Gabrys, Jurgis Aukštuolaitis, and Klemensas Vaitiekūnas. On 20–22 August 1919, Wasilewski and Tadeusz Kasprzycki together with Narutowicz and Aukštuolaitis planned out the coup details. During the coup, scheduled for the night from 28 to 29 August, the rebels were to capture Kaunas and hold it until the arrival of the Polish regular units invited to protect the city. The Council of Lithuania and the Lithuanian government was to be deposed and replaced by a pro-Polish cabinet. General Silvestras Žukauskas was to be installed as a military dictator of the new Lithuanian government, with Aukštuolaitis as his second-in-command and Narutowicz as the head of the civilian government. General Žukauskas, then chief commander of the Lithuanian forces, was not aware of the coup, but was known for his generally friendly attitude towards Poland and was expected to support the aftermath. Other posts were reserved for Mykolas Biržiška, Jonas Vileišis, Steponas Kairys, Juozas Tūbelis and others, similarly unaware of the coup. Aukštuolaitis was given 800,000 German marks and promised another 300,000 to finance the coup.

== Coup discovered ==
Map of demarcation lines of 18 June (light green) and 26 July (dark green) of 1919 between Poland and Lithuania. Poland ignored both lines and continued to advance up to the light orange line.

Eventually, the uprising was doomed by poor communication and the overeagerness of some of the PMO activists. Piłsudski failed to discourage local PMO activists from carrying out the Sejny Uprising in the Suwałki Region. The local PMO disregarded his recommendations and launched the uprising, which while locally successful, led to the failure of the nationwide coup. PMO members in Lithuania stated that the Sejny uprising had damaged their reputation, and many of its former supporters rejected calls by PMO recruiters.

The initial coup was postponed to 1 September 1919. However, some PMO units began their actions (cutting telegraph wires, damaging railways, etc.) as scheduled previously – on the night of 27 to 28 August. Lithuanian intelligence intercepted and decoded the order to delay the coup. They had known before that Poles were plotting, but did not know who and when. The Lithuanian government was informed about the cut telegraph wires and intercepted the Polish order in the morning of 28 August. However, President Antanas Smetona did not consider the threat real and did not take appropriate action.

A group of 18 Lithuanian Army officers, with tacit approval from Sleževičius, took the initiative. They were led by Liudas Gira, head of Lithuanian intelligence. Afraid that PMO members had infiltrated the military, they secretly decided to begin mass arrests of Polish supporters on the night from 28 to 29 August. Since they did not know who exactly was behind the conspiracy, the Lithuanians arrested more prominent Polish activists in Kaunas. Several dozen Poles were arrested the first night, including Aukštuolaitis and 23 Polish officers serving in the Lithuanian Army. By the second night the number of arrested Poles grew to 200. Kaunas was declared under a state of siege. The Polish press noted mass arrests of Polish activists "to whom no charge can be ascribed other than being Poles" and concluded that this was proof of the "systematic anti-Polish policies" of the "German-ridden Lithuanian government".

Because the Lithuanians did not have a list of PMO members, they did not arrest the main leaders. Also, provincial PMO branches remained intact. Therefore, on 17 September 1919, new orders were issued scheduling the second coup attempt for the end of September. This attempt was also discovered. Aldona Čarneckaitė, a Lithuanian woman, succeeded in convincing Petras Vrubliauskas (codename Daumantas), PMO deputy commander in Vilnius, to transfer the PMO document archive to the Lithuanians. On 21 September, Lithuanian spy Marcelė Kubiliūtė obtained these documents. Another cache of documents kept by Stasys Niekrašas was discovered in Kaunas; this cache contained a list of PMO members and supporters. This allowed the Lithuanians to arrest PMO members in the following days. The PMO branch in Lithuania ceased to function and was liquidated.

== Trial ==
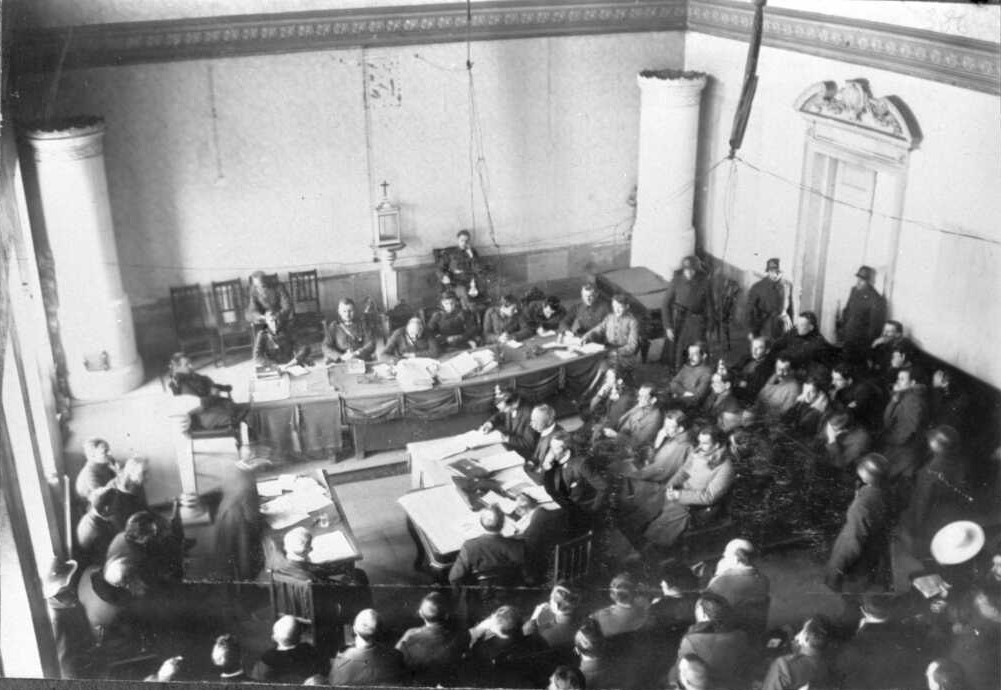
Trial of the members of the Polish Military Organisation in Kaunas, Lithuania in 1920

The Lithuanians charged 117 persons during a military trial on 11–24 December 1920. Of these 117 people, six were kept in prison, one died, 43 escaped, and 67 were released on bail. Petras Šniukšta chaired the panel of judges, Juozas Papečkys was the criminal prosecutor, and Stasys Šilingas and Petras Leonas represented Lithuania in a civil suit for damages caused to the telegraph. The defendants were represented by Adolf Grajewski, Andrius Bulota, Vladas Požela, and others.

Six leaders received life sentences (Rajmund Kowalec codename Adam Jóźwik, Jonas Niekrašas, J. Narkevičius, Vladas Kudzevičius, K. Sipavičius, and J. Majevskis). Other sentences ranged from 15 years to 8 months in prison. At least 15 individuals were acquitted. The Lithuanian prosecutor appealed the sentences as too lenient to the Supreme Tribunal of Lithuania. In April 1921, the Tribunal upheld sentencing for the main leaders but reduced them for low-ranking PMO members.

The defendants submitted their own appeals to the Supreme Tribunal, as well as various requests for amnesty and clemency. On case-by-case basis, lower ranking PMO members started receiving amnesty by early 1922. For example, several prisoners were released on the anniversary of Lithuania's independence on 16 February 1922. In 1925, Poland and Lithuania exchanged a number of political prisoners, among them a handful of PMO members. By 1928, there were no PMO members in Lithuanian prisons.

== Aftermath and evaluation ==
General Žukauskas was removed from his post as the commander of the Lithuanian Army and had to battle the perceived friendliness to Poland for much of his subsequent career. The Polish government initially denied that there was any coup; later it admitted that locals planned an uprising, but claimed it had no part in it. The coup further strained the Polish–Lithuanian relations, making Lithuanians even more uncompromising and afraid of Polish annexation.

The planned coup was criticized by historians as unrealistic. Piłsudski's plan was based on false assumptions and faulty intelligence, which incorrectly indicated that the Sleževičius government was deeply unpopular, and that the general Lithuanian population was relatively friendly to Poland. No notable ethnic Lithuanian politicians declared support for the plan; the plan relied on support from General Žukauskas, but his support was never confirmed; Narutowicz, who was to head the civilian government, was a Pole; the PMO was weak and incapable of taking control if the coup met any significant resistance; and intervention of the Polish army would have led to bloodshed and undermined the idea of a voluntary union or alliance with Poland. The only group that supported the coup was the Polish minority in Lithuania, increasingly alienated by Lithuanian government policies. However, according to the Lithuanian census of 1923, the minority constituted 3.2% of the population outside the Vilnius Region. On the ground, the uprising was doomed by poor communication and the overeagerness of some of the PMO activists.

== See also ==
- 1919 Polish coup attempt
- Proclamation to the inhabitants of the former Grand Duchy of Lithuania

== Bibliography ==
- Čekutis, Ričardas; Žygelis, Dalius (29 January 2007). "Laisvės kryžkelės. 1918–1920 m. laisvės kovos" (in Lithuanian). Bernardinai.lt.
- Davies, Norman (2005). God's Playground: A History of Poland in Two Volumes. Oxford University Press. ISBN 978-0-19-925340-1.
- Eidintas, Alfonsas; Žalys, Vytautas; Senn, Alfred Erich (1999). Tuskenis, Edvardas (ed.). Lithuania in European Politics: The Years of the First Republic, 1918-1940. Palgrave Macmillan. ISBN 978-0-312-22458-5.
- Janauskas, Pranas (2004). "Istorinė byla: POW narių teismas Kaune 1920 metais". Darbai ir dienos (in Lithuanian). 40: 35–60. doi:10.7220/2335-8769.40.3. ISSN 2335-8769.
- Lane, Thomas (2001). Lithuania: Stepping Westward. Routledge. ISBN 0-415-26731-5.
- Lesčius, Vytautas (2004). Lietuvos kariuomenė nepriklausomybės kovose 1918–1920 (PDF). Lietuvos kariuomenės istorija (in Lithuanian). Vilnius: General Jonas Žemaitis Military Academy of Lithuania. ISBN 9955-423-23-4. Archived from the original (PDF) on 2023-11-07.
- Łossowski, Piotr (1995). Konflikt polsko-litewski 1918–1920 (in Polish). Książka i Wiedza. ISBN 83-05-12769-9.
- Mańczuk, Tadeusz (2003). "Z Orłem przeciw Pogoni. Powstanie sejneńskie 1919". Mówią Wieki (in Polish). 12 (258): 32–37. Archived from the original on 23 December 2007.
- Rezmer, Waldemar (2020). "Women and Soldiers in the War of Polish–Lithuanian Intelligence of 1920 to 1939". Res Humanitariae. XXVIII: 256–257. doi:10.15181/rh.v28i0.2236. ISSN 1822-7708.
- Senn, Alfred Erich (1966). The Great Powers, Lithuania and the Vilna Question, 1920–1928. Studies in East European history. Brill Archive. OCLC 398265.
- Senn, Alfred Erich (1975) [1959]. The Emergence of Modern Lithuania. Greenwood Press. ISBN 0-8371-7780-4.
- Skučaitė, Virginija (16 February 2016). "Merginos, išgelbėjusios Lietuvos nepriklausomybę" (in Lithuanian). Kauno diena.
- Snyder, Timothy (2004). The Reconstruction of Nations: Poland, Ukraine, Lithuania, Belarus, 1569–1999. Yale University Press. ISBN 0-300-10586-X.
- Vaitiekūnas, Stasys (2006). Lietuvos gyventojai: Per du tūkstantmečius (in Lithuanian). Vilnius: Mokslo ir enciklopedijų leidybos institutas. ISBN 5-420-01585-4.
