= 10th Infantry Regiment (Lithuania) =

Former Lithuanian Army formation (1919–24)

- 10-asis pėstininkų pulkas
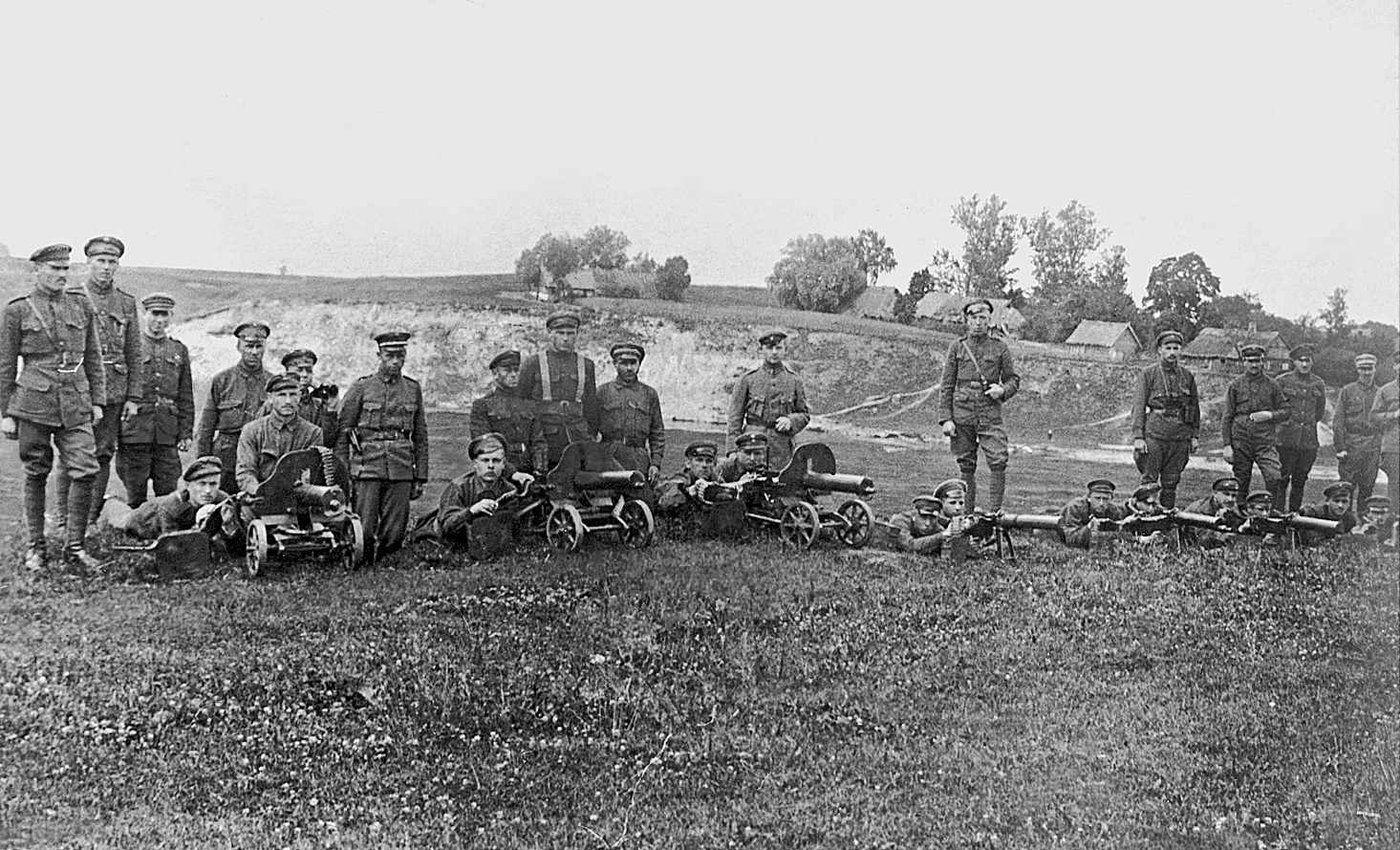
- 10th Infantry Regiment's 1st Machine Gun Company in training
- Active: June 10, 1919 – March 1, 1924
- Country: Lithuania
- Branch: Lithuanian Army
- Type: Infantry
- Anniversaries: March 30

The 10th Infantry Regiment (Lithuanian: 10-asis pėstininkų pulkas) was an infantry regiment that served in the Lithuanian Army from its founding in 1919 to 1924. The regiment fought against Poles in the Lithuanian Wars of Independence near Augustavas, Suvalkai, Seinai and elsewhere.

== 1919 ==
On 10 June 1919, the 1st Infantry Regiment's 3rd Battalion was separated from the regiment and was renamed as the 1st Reserve Battalion (Lithuanian: 1-as atsargos batalionas). The battalion was supposed to train new recruits, but when the Poles invaded Lithuania, the battalion, under the command of Officer Konstantinas Žukas, had to take part in actions in the Suvalkai Region and the Polish instigated Sejny Uprising. The Military Commandant's (Lithuanian: Karo komendantūra) Companies of Seinai, Suvalkai, Alytus and Vilkaviškis also operated attached to the Reserve Battalion.

In August 1919, Suvalkai Military Commandant's Company was assigned to the Reserve Battalion. When the Lithuanian forces established themselves at the Foch Line, the Reserve Battalion held the line from the lake Vygris to Pasiekai and further to Filicijanavas farmstead (Vienkiemis) on the shores of the lake Galadusys.

== 1920 ==
On 1 July 1920, the battalion's line lengthened from the border with Germany even until Druskininkai.

=== August ===
On 1 August 1920, the Reserve Battalion was reformed and renamed as the two-battalion 10th Infantry Regiment. The regiment's commander was Major Jonas Motiejūnas-Valevičius. On 24 August 1920, the regiment held the line Grabavas–Ožė, and on August 26, from Grabavas–Augustavas–Štabinas–Lipskas. The commander of the 1st Company was given the separate task of concentrating in Ožė, and, if the opportunity arises, to take over Gardinas. On 30 August, when the Poles attacked during the Battle of Seinai, the regiment's forces, as they were widely dispersed, had to retreat. On 31 August, the Poles occupied Suvalkai and the Seinai.

=== September ===
The regiment's front was from Vižainis to Žagariai, and many clashes took place until mid-September. On September 11, the regiment was ordered to concentrate in Kalvarija and be the reserve of the Marijampolė Group. On September 22, the regiment went to the front near Didžioji Kirsna. On September 23, the regiment went to Seirijai and together with the remains of the 8th Infantry Regiment, they took the position Buteliūnai–Mikabaliai–Paserninkai river until Nemunas near Živulčiškė. On September 28, the regiment is moved to the Liubavas–Salopieragiai district.

=== October ===
The regiment received its official name in October. On October 9, the regiment concentrated in Marijampolė. On October 16, it reached the Vievis district, where the regiment remained until the end of the operations as the divisional reserve. On December 4, it went to Marijampolė.

== Interwar ==
In 1921, the regiment's feast was established on March 30. The regiment was reorganized as the 2nd Separate Border Battalion (Lithuanian: Antrasis atskirasis pasienio batalionas) in 1923. It was disbanded on 1 March 1924.

== Commanders ==
- Officer Konstantinas Žukas
- Major Jonas Motiejūnas-Valevičius
- Aleksandras Jakaitis
- Vladas Skorupskis
- Ignas Musteikis
- Pranas Kaunas

== Sources ==
=== Books ===
- Lesčius, Vytautas (2004). Lietuvos Kariuomenė Nepriklausomybės Kovose 1918–1920 (PDF) (in Lithuanian). Vilnius: Generolo Jono Žemaičio Lietuvos karo akademija. ISBN 9955-423-23-4.
- Surgailis, Gintautas (2024). Dešimtasis pėstininkų Marijampolės pulkas (PDF). Lietuvos kariuomenės istorija (in Lithuanian). Vilnius: Generolo Jono Žemaičio Lietuvos karo akademija. ISBN 978-609-8277-54-8.

=== Encyclopedias ===
- Steponaitis, Vytautas (1937). "Dešimtas pėst. Marijampolės pulkas". In Biržiška, Vaclovas (ed.). Lietuviškoji enciklopedija (in Lithuanian). Vol. 6: Darbininkų žodis - Drugenis. Kaunas: Spaudos Fondas. p. 515.
- Jasulaitis, Vytautas (2022). "Dešimtasis pėstininkų pulkas". VLE (in Lithuanian).
