= Soviet–Lithuanian Peace Treaty =

Signed between Lithuania and Soviet Russia on 12 July 1920

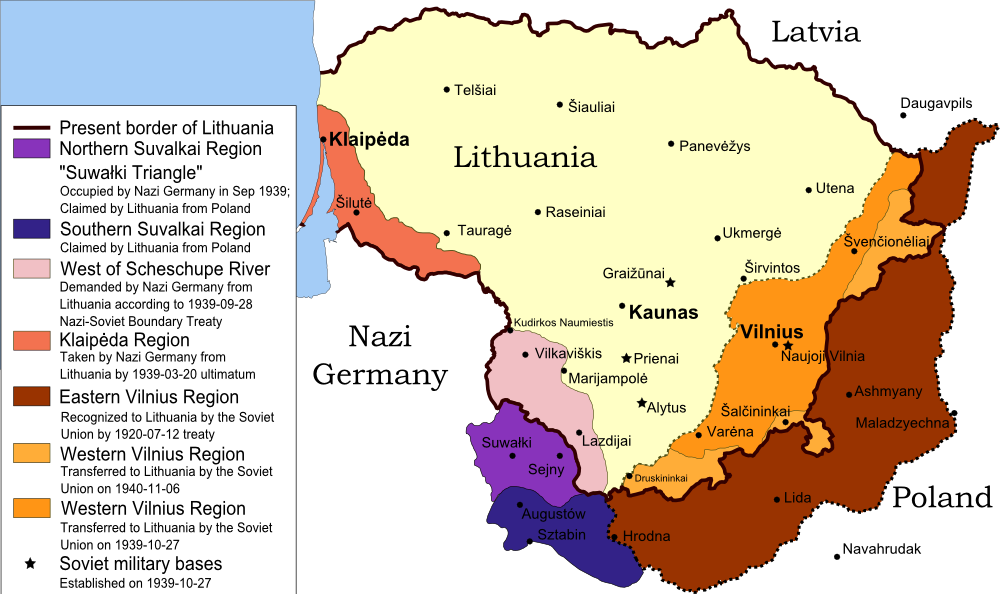
The map shows the eastern border of Lithuania that was recognised by the treaty by the dotted line. It was almost identical to the historical ethnic Lithuanian lands of the 13th to the 16th centuries but disputed by Belarusians.

The Soviet–Lithuanian Peace Treaty, also known as the Moscow Peace Treaty, was signed between Lithuania and Soviet Russia on July 12, 1920. In exchange for Lithuania's neutrality and permission to move its troops in the territory that was recognised during its war against Poland, Soviet Russia recognized the sovereignty of Lithuania. The treaty was a major milestone in Lithuania's struggle for international recognition and recognised Lithuania's eastern borders. Interwar Lithuania officially maintained that its de jure borders were those delineated by the treaty although a large territory, the Vilnius Region, was actually controlled by Poland.

Ratification documents were exchanged in Moscow on October 14, 1920. The treaty was registered in the League of Nations Treaty Series on March 8, 1921.

== Background ==
Lithuania declared independence from the former Russian Empire on February 16, 1918. In March, the Bolsheviks signed the Treaty of Brest-Litovsk and renounced any claims to the Baltic states, including Lithuania. Ober Ost, the German occupying authority, did not allow Lithuania to establish government institutions, organize military or police forces or attempt to define its borders. Lithuanian independence remained a largely-unrealized political declaration.

That changed when Germany surrendered in November 1918. Lithuanians hurriedly adopted a provisional constitution, formed a government and started to organise an army.

Soviet Russia denounced the Treaty of Brest-Litovsk and renewed its interest in the Baltic region. In late December 1918, Lithuanian territory was invaded by Bolshevik forces, who were pursuing the retreating Germans. That marked the beginning of the Lithuanian Wars of Independence and the Polish–Soviet War. Within a month, Soviet forces controlled large portions of northern and eastern Lithuania. The advance was stopped only with help from German volunteers. In Vilnius, the Bolsheviks proclaimed a puppet Soviet government, led by Vincas Mickevičius-Kapsukas. In February 1919, the Lithuanian Soviet Socialist Republic was merged with the Socialist Soviet Republic of Byelorussia, to form Litbel. The entity was short-lived, as Poland and Lithuania successfully counterattacked. Vilnius, the historic capital of Lithuania, was seized by the Poles in April. The last Bolsheviks were pushed from Lithuanian territory at the end of August. Litbel had its entire territory taken by September 1919 and ceased to exist.

== Negotiations ==
=== Stalling diplomatic talks ===
As the Bolsheviks were pushed from the Baltic region, Lenin sought to arrange peace treaties to ease anti-Bolshevik tensions in Europe. The first Lithuanian–Russian attempt at negotiation took place on September 11, 1919, when the People's Commissar of Foreign Affairs of Soviet Russia, Georgy Chicherin, sent a note with a proposal for a peace treaty. It was a de facto recognition of the Lithuanian state. Similar proposals were delivered to Latvia and Estonia. On September 14 and 15, the Baltic states held a trilateral meeting in Tallinn and agreed to begin simultaneous peace talks with the Soviets.

However, Lithuania delayed contacting Moscow and the collective negotiations did not take place. Lithuanian feared that negotiations with communist Russia, which was isolated from European politics, would damage its relationships with the western powers that had not yet recognized Lithuania. While Lithuania was preparing for the first democratic elections to the Constituent Assembly of Lithuania, election campaigns urged the government to start negotiations. On March 31, 1920, Augustinas Voldemaras, the Lithuanian minister of foreign affairs, informed Soviet diplomats that Lithuania was ready to open the talks if Moscow recognized Lithuania within its ethnic lands and acknowledged Vilnius as its capital. The Soviets agreed to discuss the situation and suggested for preliminary negotiations to begin on April 15. The talks in Moscow did not begin until May 7.

=== Positions ===
The Lithuanian delegation, led by Tomas Naruševičius, demanded Russia recognise an independent Lithuania as a legal successor to the Grand Duchy of Lithuania, but the Soviet delegation, led by Adolph Joffe, was prepared to recognize Lithuania based only on the self-determination principle. Territorial disputes were the most contentious issue. Lithuania demanded the territories of former Kovno, Vilna, Grodno and Suwałki Governorates. Those areas, according to the Lithuanians, were ethnically Lithuanian. M. Balinsky's census of 1857 was provided as evidence that the territory was inhabited primarily by Lithuanians. Lithuanians asserted that the large Jewish and Belarusian populations in the region wanted to be part of Lithuania. They brought a representative of each group, Simon Rosenbaum and Dominyk Semashko, to support that case. It was agreed that the territory of Lithuania could be easily identified, as it was inhabited by Litvaks. The Second Polish Republic also laid claim to the territory and had actual control over it at the time, especially the Vilnius Region, a few years later, the Republic of Central Lithuania was established.

The Soviets agreed to recognize the territory of Lithuania if it agreed to form a military alliance against Poland, which was engaged in the Kiev offensive against Soviet Russia. The Lithuanians were tempted by the opportunity to regain Vilnius but refused. Even though the Soviets seemed a natural ally against Poland, Lithuanians reasoned that staying on good terms with Poland and its allies, France and Britain, was a better long-term strategy. Lithuania informed Britain about Soviet plans on the hope that such a move would prove Lithuania's trustworthiness and would put indirect pressure on Poland to reach an agreement regarding Vilnius that was acceptable. Those tactics did not prove successful because Poland was invariably backed by France and indirect British pressure was not strong enough to change Poland's foreign policy.

The negotiations were long and difficult. While the Russians were losing ground to the Poles, who took Kiev in May 1920, the Lithuanians sought to delay the talks. On 22 May 1920, the Lithuanian delegation even threatened to withdraw from the peace talks. However, as the situation changed, and Russia successfully counterattacked, the Lithuanians were pressured into signing the treaty on 12 July. After some debate over whether the treaty was sincere, and the Soviets had assumed any real liability, the Constituent Assembly of Lithuania ratified it on 8 August 1920.

== Terms ==
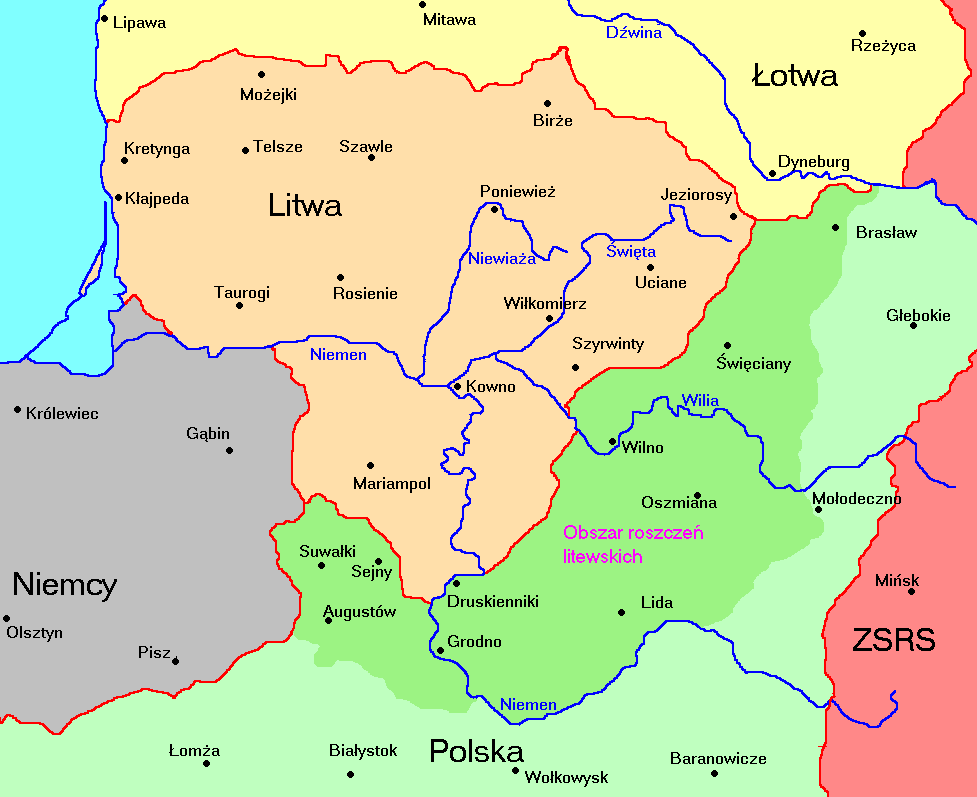
The lands occupied by Poland, which were assigned to Lithuania under the peace treaty, are marked in green

The treaty had 19 articles. Article 1 stipulated that Russia recognized Lithuania's independence without reservations and voluntarily abandoned any territorial claims. Article 2 described the Lithuanian territory. The Soviet Union acknowledged Lithuanian authority over the Vilnius Region, including Breslauja, Gardinas, Lyda, Pastovys, Ašmena and Vilnius. The fate of the Suvalkai Region was not determined by the treaty, as the line was drawn only to the village of Sztabin. The Bolsheviks also promised to pay war reparations in the amount of three million rubles and 107,000 hectares of timber. Lithuania was relieved of any debt obligations.

The treaty allowed refugees and prisoners of war to return to their homeland. Lithuania then held about 2,000 Russian prisoners, and Russia held about 150 Lithuanians. Russians in Lithuania could opt for either Lithuanian or Russian citizenship. Russia promised to return any cultural and historical property that was removed during the wars. A working commission was created, which evaluated the damage to Lithuania at about 816 million rubles, and 407 million rubles for damage to the territory that was controlled by Poland. Separate agreements would be made later to decide protection of the frontier, conventions of trade and transit and other details.

The treaty also contained a secret clause that allowed Soviet forces unrestricted movement within Soviet-recognized Lithuanian territory for the duration of Soviet hostilities with Poland; that clause would lead to questions regarding the issue of Lithuanian neutrality in the ongoing Polish-Soviet War.

Lithuania was to stop the activities of the "anti-Soviet organisations and groups" on its territory, including the activities of the exiled bodies of the Belarusian People's Republic.

== Aftermath ==
=== Polish–Lithuanian conflict ===
While the treaty was being negotiated and signed, most of the territory granted by the treaty to Lithuania was already controlled by Bolshevik forces. As the Poles were retreating from western Russia, Lithuania attempted to secure the borders outlined in the treaty. Lithuanian forces crossed the Foch line on July 19, seeking to take control of the territories granted to Lithuania by the Soviet Union, advancing rapidly despite Polish protests and, in several cases, fighting skirmishes with the retreating Polish forces. That led to clashes in southern Lithuania over the towns of Sejny, Augustów and Suwałki. According to historian Piotr Lossowski, the Lithuanians also provided the Soviets with logistical support.

The Bolshevik forces were the first to enter Vilnius on July 14, 1920, although the treaty did not transfer it to the Lithuanians. The Soviets installed a puppet government, the former Litbel, with the intent of fomenting a socialist revolution. Leon Trotsky and Mikhail Tukhachevsky were preparing the overthrow of the Lithuanian government. The plans never came to pass since Poland defeated Soviet forces in the Battle of Warsaw between August 13 and August 25. On August 26, as the Polish Army was approaching the southern borders of Lithuania, the Soviets finally transferred Vilnius to Lithuanian control and the Red Army retreated.

In September, when the Poles had gained an upper hand and were pursuing the Soviets back to the east, Soviet forces moved at will through Lithuanian-controlled territory, but Polish forces that tried to pursue them were arrested and interned. Lithuania's declared neutrality was challenged by Poland, which accused Lithuania of allowing free Soviet passage through its territory, which Lithuania could not deny. The treaty did not create a formal military alliance between the Soviets and the Lithuanians but it diminished Lithuania's standing as a neutral state. Łossowski wrote that Lithuania's lack of neutrality towards Poland was such that "the Polish government could have with full justification treated Lithuania as a country participating in the war on the other side, with all of its political and legal implications". Historian Alfred E. Senn wrote that "the Lithuanians cannot claim to have been 'strictly neutral'", and that "the Lithuanians should not have been surprised when, at the end of August, Warsaw refused to recognize Kaunas's neutrality". This can be understood in the context of Vilna offensive, Sejny uprising, 1919 Polish coup attempt in Lithuania and other intrigues by the Polish side, which made Lithuanians suspicious of their true intentions.

In late August, Lithuanian and Polish missions met in Kaunas to negotiate the situation. While the talks were underway, Polish troops retook Sejny, Augustów, and Suwałki in the south. The Suwałki Region held great symbolic importance for the Lithuanians as a locus of their independence movement. Lithuania mounted military operations in the area. Poland also wanted to seize Vilnius, which it had been forced to abandon during the Soviet offensive in July. The clashes led to a war on a wide front between Poland and Lithuania in September. An intervention was made by the League of Nations, which brokered the Suwałki Agreement on October 7, 1920, which was to have taken effect on October 10. However, on October 9, Polish General Lucjan Żeligowski staged a mutiny, invaded Lithuania and took over Vilnius. Most of the Vilnius and Suwałki Regions would remain under Polish control during the interwar period, and interwar Polish–Lithuanian relations were described as "no war, no peace".

=== Legacy ===
The treaty represented a major breakthrough in Lithuania's quest for international recognition. The provision that permitted the return of Lithuanian World War I refugees and prisoners was a welcomed development. However, the Soviet Union did not pay all its reparations and never seriously considered returning the cultural and historical property. Lithuanian politicians and historians continue to seek the return of those items, but the Russian government claims that they are lost.

Modern Belarusian historiography regards the treaty, especially the cession of territories of modern Belarus to Lithuania (primarily Hrodna, Shchuchyn, Lida, Ashmyany, Smarhon, Pastavy, Braslaw but also the contemporary Vilnius Region with Vilna) as a unilateral act by the Soviet authorities that disregarded the national interests of the Belarusian people and was aimed at immediate military and political gains.

Some historians have asserted that if Poland had not prevailed in the Polish–Soviet War, Lithuania would have been invaded by the Soviets, and would never have experienced two decades of independence. Despite the Soviet–Lithuanian Peace Treaty, Lithuania was very close to being invaded by the Soviets in summer 1920 and being forcibly incorporated into that state, and only the Polish victory derailed this plan. A group of men led by the Soviet agent Stanislav Vaupshasov organized a coup against the Lithuanian government, but their plans were halted after the Polish victory in the Battle of Warsaw.

The bilingual treaty was signed in two copies of equal power and the Lithuanian copy, which had been removed from Lithuania prior to the 1940 Soviet occupation of Lithuania, first to Sweden and later to Canada by the Lithuanian diplomat Vytautas Jonas Gylys. The original document was found and preserved by Charles Alexander Hopkins and, in 2021, was transferred to the Lithuanian Central State Archive.

== See also ==
- Latvian–Soviet Peace Treaty – similar treaty with Latvia, signed on 11 August 1920
- Treaty of Tartu (Estonia–Russia) – similar treaty with Estonia, signed on 2 February 1920
- Treaty of Tartu (Finland–Russia) – similar treaty with Finland, signed on 14 October 1920
- Peace of Riga – similar treaty involving Poland, Soviet Russia and Soviet Ukraine, signed on 18 March 1921
