= 12th Infantry Regiment =

12th Infantry Regiment may refer to:

- 12th Infantry Regiment (Lithuania)
- 12th Infantry Regiment (Poland)
- 12th Infantry Regiment (South Korea)
- 12th Infantry Regiment (United States)
- 12th Regiment of Foot

== See also ==
- 12th Regiment (disambiguation)
