= Kojle =

Lake in Podlaskie Voivodeship, Poland

Jezioro Kojle Kojle Lake
- Kalis (Lithuanian)
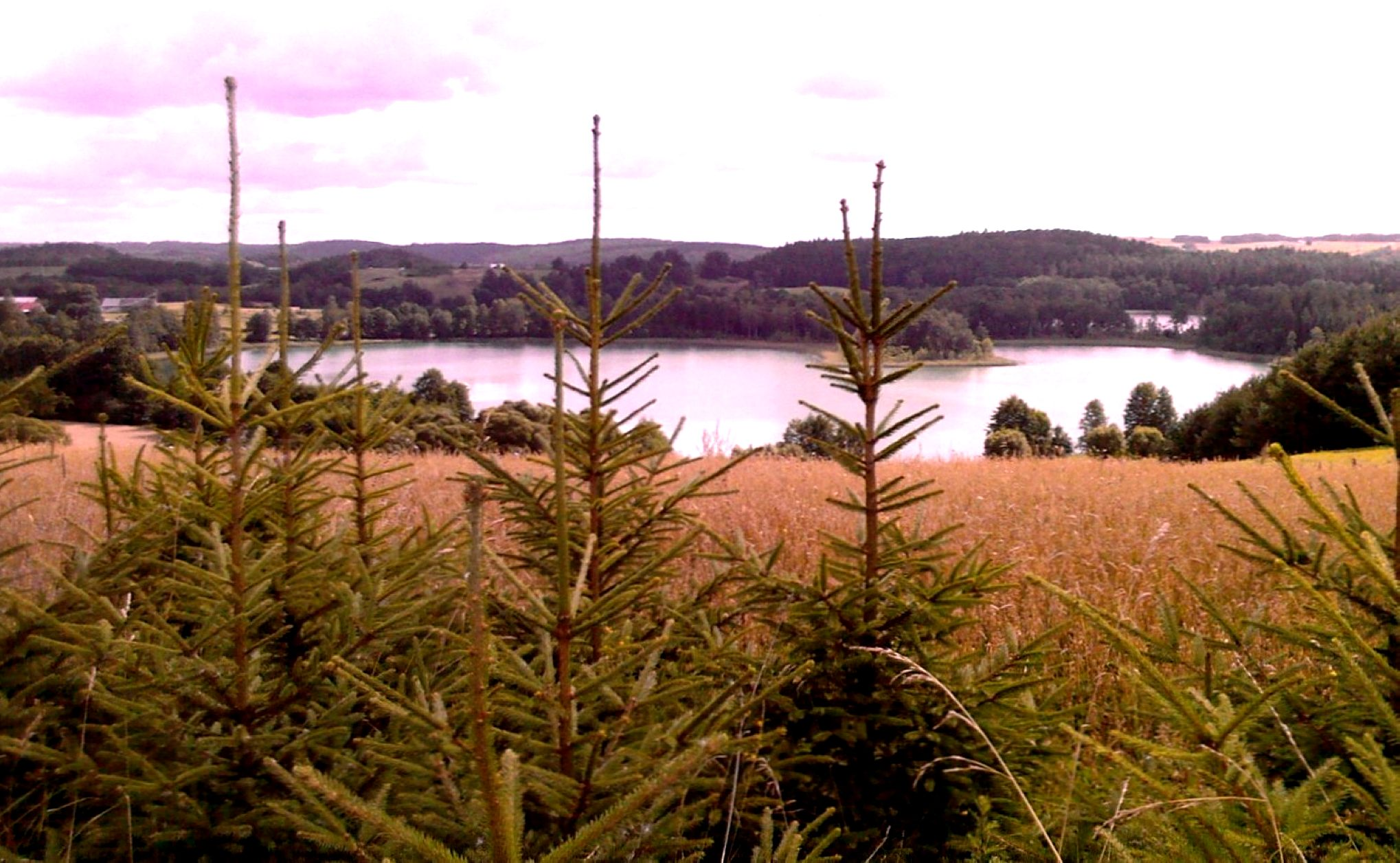

- Location within Poland
- Location: Suwałki Region, Podlaskie Voivodeship, Poland
- Coordinates: 54°16′33″N 22°53′30″E
- Max. length: 0.65 km (0.40 miles)
- Max. width: 0.4 km (0.25 miles)
- Surface area: 17 ha (42 acres)
- Average depth: 33 m (108 ft)

Kojle (Lithuanian: Kalis) is a lake in Suwałki Region, Podlaskie Voivodeship, Poland. It is situated in the Suwaki Landscape Park. It is oval-shaped with numerous bays on the south side. It has a muddy bottom and is overgrown by rushes. It is 17 hectares (42 acres) large, 0.65 kilometres (0.40 miles) long, 0.4 kilometres (0.25 miles) wide and 33 metres (108 ft) deep. Kojle is connected to Perty Lake.
