= Sejny Uprising =

Polish uprising against the Lithuanian authorities in August 1919

- Part of Polish–Lithuanian War
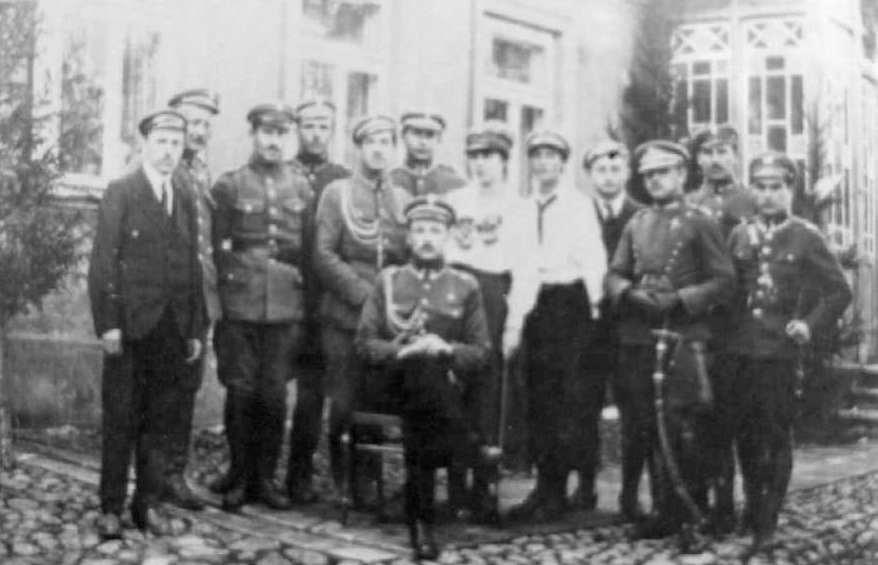
- Lt. Adam Rudnicki, leader of the Sejny Uprising, and his colleagues. August 1919.
Date	August 23 – September 7, 1919
Location	Suwałki Region
Result	Polish victory
Territorial changes	Lithuanians retreated behind the Foch Line; Poland secured Sejny

Belligerents
(Second Polish Republic) Polish Military Organization (PMO) (Second Polish Republic) 41st Infantry Regiment	(Lithuania) Lithuanian Sejny Command (Lithuania) 1st Reserve Battalion

Commanders and leaders
(Second Polish Republic) Adam Rudnicki (Second Polish Republic) Mieczysław Mackiewicz (Second Polish Republic) Wacław Zawadzki †	(Lithuania) Kazys Ladiga

Strength
900–1,200 PMO volunteers 800 regular troops	900 regular troops 300 volunteers

Casualties and losses
37 killed in action 70 wounded	

The Sejny Uprising or Seinai Revolt (Polish: Powstanie sejneńskie, Lithuanian: Seinų sukilimas) refers to a Polish uprising against the Lithuanian authorities in August 1919 in the ethnically mixed area surrounding the town of Sejny (Lithuanian: Seinai). When German forces, which occupied the territory during World War I, retreated from the area in May 1919, they turned over administration to the Lithuanians. Trying to prevent an armed conflict between Poland and Lithuania, the Entente drew a demarcation line, known as the Foch Line. The line assigned much of the disputed Suwałki (Suvalkai) Region to Poland and required the Lithuanian Army to retreat. While the Lithuanians retreated from some areas, they refused to leave Sejny (Seinai), because of its major Lithuanian population. Polish irregular forces began the uprising on August 23, 1919, and soon received support from the regular Polish Army. After several military skirmishes, Polish forces secured Sejny and the Lithuanians retreated behind the Foch Line.

The uprising did not solve the larger border conflict between Poland and Lithuania over the ethnically mixed Suwałki Region. Both sides complained about each other's repressive measures. The conflict intensified in 1920, causing military skirmishes of the Polish–Lithuanian War. Sejny changed hands frequently until the Suwałki Agreement of October 1920, which left Sejny on the Polish side. The uprising undermined the plans of Polish leader Józef Piłsudski who was planning a coup d'état in Lithuania to replace the Lithuanian government with a pro-Polish cabinet which would agree to a union with Poland (the proposed Międzymorze federation). Because the Sejny Uprising had prompted the Lithuanian intelligence to intensify its investigations of Polish activities in Lithuania, they discovered plans for the coup and prevented it, arresting Polish sympathizers. These hostilities in Sejny further strained the Polish–Lithuanian relations.

Eventually, Poland and Lithuania reached an agreement on a new border that left Sejny on the Polish side of the border. The Polish–Lithuanian border in the Suwałki Region has remained the same since then (with the exception of the World War II period).

== Background ==
During the ages, the lands surrounding the town of Suwałki were part of the Grand Duchy of Lithuania until 1795. Sejny itself was property of Vilnius' Dominican friars from 1603 until 1805. During the Third Partition of the Polish-Lithuanian Commonwealth in 1795, the region became part of the Kingdom of Prussia as New East Prussia until 1807, from then until 1815, it was part of the Duchy of Warsaw which Napoleon had created. For a century after the conclusion of the Napoleonic Wars, the town was in Congress Poland, a part of the Russian Empire.

During World War I, the region was captured by the German Empire, which intended to incorporate the area into its province of East Prussia. After the German defeat, the victorious Entente was willing to assign the territory to either the newly independent Poland or Lithuania. The future of the region was discussed at the Paris Peace Conference in January 1919. The Germans, whose former Ober-Ost administration was preparing to evacuate, initially supported leaving the area to a Polish administration. However, as Poland was becoming an ally of France, German support gradually shifted towards Lithuania. In July 1919, when the German troops began their slow retreat from the area, they delegated the administration to local Lithuanian authorities. Lithuanian officers and troops, who first arrived in the region in May, began to organize military units in the pre-war Sejny county.

According to Russian statistics from 1889, there were 57.8% Lithuanians, 19.1% Poles, and 3.5% Belarusians in the Suwałki Governorate. It is generally agreed that Lithuanians formed the majority of the population in the northern Suwałki Governorate, while Poles were concentrated in the south. But Lithuanian and Polish historians and political scientists continued to disagree over the location of the line that separated the areas of Lithuanian and Polish majorities. Lithuanians claimed that Sejny and the surrounding area were inhabited primarily by the Lithuanians, while the Poles claimed exactly the opposite. The German census of 1916 showed that 51% of Sejny population was Lithuanian.

== Demarcation lines ==
Selected lines of demarcation between Lithuania and Poland in 1919–1939. Light green denotes the first line, drawn on June 18, 1919. The second, dark green line known as Foch Line, was drawn on July 27.

In the aftermath of World War I, the Conference of Ambassadors drew the first demarcation line between Poland and Lithuania on June 18, 1919. The line satisfied no one, and Polish troops continued to advance deeper into the Lithuanian-controlled territory. These attacks coincided with the signing of the Treaty of Versailles on June 28, which eliminated any danger from Germany. Attempting to halt further hostilities, Marshal of France Ferdinand Foch proposed a new line, known as the Foch Line, on July 18, 1919.

The Foch Line was negotiated with the Polish war mission, led by General Tadeusz Jordan-Rozwadowski in Paris, while Lithuanian representatives were not invited. The Foch Line had two major modifications compared to the June 18 line: first, the entire line was moved west to give extra protection to the strategic Warsaw – Saint Petersburg Railway and second, the Suwałki Region, including the towns of Sejny, Suwałki, Puńsk, was assigned to Poland. Despite assurances at the time that the line was just a temporary measure to normalize the situation before full negotiations could take place, the southern Foch Line is the present-day Lithuania–Poland border.

On July 26, the Foch Line was accepted by the Conference of Ambassadors as the provisional border between the two states. Lithuanians were not informed about this decision until August 3. Neither country was satisfied: both Lithuanian and Polish forces would have to retreat from the Suwałki and Vilnius regions, respectively. Those Germans still present in the region also objected to the boundary of the line. The Lithuanian forces (about 350 strong) left the town of Suwałki by August 7, but stopped in Sejny and formed a line at the Czarna Hańcza river – Wigry Lake, thus effectively violating the demarcation line. Lithuanians believed that the Foch Line was not the final decision, and that they had the duty to protect Lithuanian outposts in the region.

== Uprising preparations ==
On August 12, 1919, two days after the Germans retreated from Sejny, a Polish meeting in the town attracted over 100 delegates from neighboring Polish communities; the meeting passed a resolution that "only securing the area by Polish Army can solve the problem." The Sejny branch of the Polish Military Organization (PMO), led by Polish regular army officers Adam Rudnicki and Wacław Zawadzki, began preparing for the uprising on August 16. PMO members and local militia volunteers numbered some 900 or 1,200 men (sources vary). The uprising was scheduled for the night of August 22 to 23, 1919. The date was chosen to coincide with the withdrawal of German troops from the town of Suwałki. The Poles hoped to capture the territory up to the Foch Line and advance further to take control of the towns of Seirijai, Lazdijai, Kapčiamiestis as far as Simnas.

According to the Polish historian Tadeusz Mańczuk, Piłsudski – who was planning a coup d'état in Kaunas – discouraged the local PMO activists from carrying out the Sejny Uprising. Piłsudski reasoned that any hostilities could leave Lithuanians even more opposed to the proposed union with Poland (see Międzymorze). The local PMO disregarded his recommendations and launched the uprising. While locally successful, it led to the failure of the nationwide coup.

On August 17, a Lithuanian counter-demonstration was staged. Its participants read aloud a recently issued recruiting proclamation of the Lithuanian volunteer army: "Citizens! Our nation is in danger! To arms! We shall leave not a single occupant on our lands!" On August 20, Prime Minister of Lithuania Mykolas Sleževičius visited Sejny and called on Lithuanians to defend their lands "to the end, however they can, with axes, pitchforks and scythes". According to Lesčius, at the time the Lithuanian command in Sejny had only 260 infantry and 70 cavalry personnel, stretched along the long line of defense. There were only 10 Lithuanian guards and 20 clerical staff in the town itself. Mańczuk and Buchowski note that the Polish insurgents estimated the Lithuanian forces at 1,200 infantry (Mańczuk also adds an estimate of 120 cavalry), including a 400-strong garrison in Sejny.

== Military skirmishes ==
According to the Lithuanian historian Lesčius, the first Polish assault of about 300 PMO members on August 22 was repelled, but the next day Lithuanians were forced to retreat towards Lazdijai. Over 100 Lithuanians were imprisoned in Sejny when their commander Bardauskas sided with the Poles. The Polish insurgents also attacked Lazdijai and Kapčiamiestis, towns on the Lithuanian side of the Foch Line.

In early morning of August 25, Lithuanians counterattacked and recaptured Sejny. Polish sources claim that Lithuanians there were aided by a company of Germans volunteers, but Lithuanian sources assert that it was an excuse used by Rudnicki to explain his defeat. The Lithuanian forces recovered some important documents and property, freed Lithuanian prisoners and, according to Mańczuk, executed several of the PMO fighters they found wounded.

On the evening of August 25, the first regular unit (41st Infantry Regiment) of the Polish Army received an order to advance towards Sejny. The Lithuanian forces retreated on the same day when they learned about the approaching Polish reinforcements. According to Mańczuk, they based their retreat on an erroneous report about a "large Polish cavalry unit" operating to their rear; only small groups of Polish partisans operated there. Later the next day, during the afternoon of August 26, the PMO forces in Sejny were joined by the 41st Infantry Regiment.

On August 26, a large anti-Polish protest took place in Lazdijai, with cries to march on Sejny. The last Lithuanian attempt to retake the town was made on August 28. The Lithuanians (about 650 men) were defeated by the combined forces of the Polish Army (800 men) and PMO volunteers (500 men). On August 27, the Poles officially demanded that Lithuanians retreat behind the Foch Line. On September 1, Rudnicki announced incorporation of PMO volunteers into the 41st Infantry Regiment. During the negotiations on September 5, representatives of the two groups agreed to settle on a detailed demarcation line; Lithuanians agreed to retreat by September 7. The Polish regular army units did not cross the Foch Line, and refused to aid the PMO insurgents still operating on the Lithuanian side.

Polish sources give total Polish casualties for the Sejny Uprising as 37 killed in action and 70 wounded.

== Aftermath ==
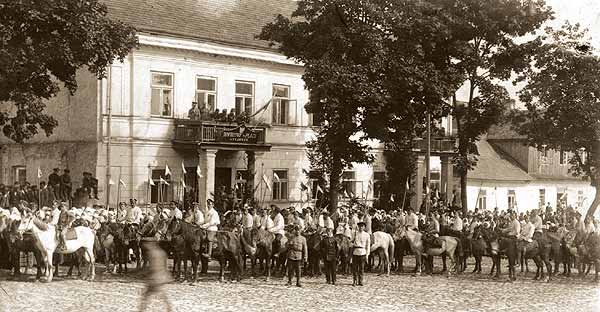
Polish cavalry parade in Sejny

After the uprising, Poland repressed Lithuanian cultural life in Sejny. Lithuanian schools in Sejny (which had some 300 pupils) and surrounding villages were closed. The local Lithuanian clergy were evicted, and the Sejny Priest Seminary relocated. According to the Lithuanians, the repressions were even more far-reaching, including a ban on public use of the Lithuanian language and the closing of Lithuanian organizations, which had a total of 1,300 members. The New York Times, reporting on renewed hostilities a year later, described the 1919 Sejny events as a violent occupation by the Poles, in which the Lithuanian inhabitants, teachers, and religious ministers were maltreated and expelled. Polish historian Łossowski notes that both sides mistreated the civilian population and exaggerated reports to gain internal and foreign support.

The uprising contributed to the deterioration of the Polish–Lithuanian relations and further discouraged the Lithuanians from joining the proposed Międzymorze federation. The Sejny Uprising doomed the Polish plan to overthrow the Lithuanian government in a coup d'état. After the uprising, the Lithuanian police and intelligence intensified their investigation of Polish sympathizers and soon uncovered the planned coup. They made mass arrests of Polish activists from August 27 to the end of September 1919. During the investigations, lists of PMO supporters were found; law enforcement completely suppressed the organisation in Lithuania.

Hostilities over the Suwałki Region resumed in summer 1920. When the Polish Army began to retreat during the course of the Polish–Soviet War, the Lithuanians moved to secure what they claimed to be their new borders, set by the Soviet–Lithuanian Peace Treaty of July 1920. The Peace Treaty granted Sejny and surrounding area to Lithuania. Poland did not recognize this bilateral treaty. Ensuing tensions heightened until the outbreak of the Polish–Lithuanian War. Sejny changed hands frequently until it was controlled by Polish forces on September 22, 1920. The situation was legalized by the Suwałki Agreement of October 7, 1920, which effectively returned the town to the Polish side of the border.
