= Jakėnai (Varėna) =

Village in Alytus County, Lithuania

- Village
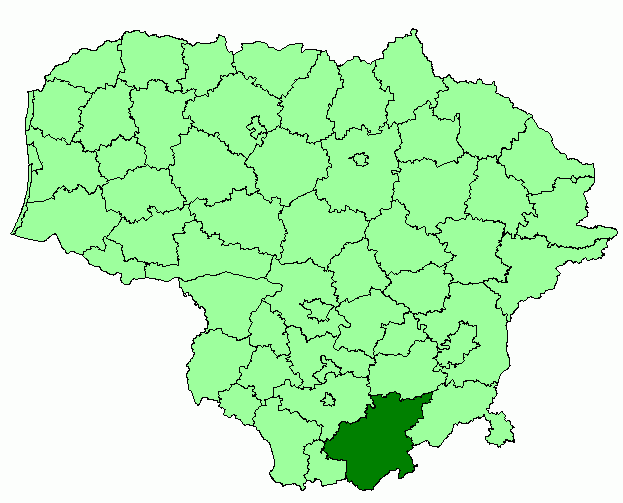
- Location in Varėna district municipality Location of Varėna district in Lithuania
- Coordinates: 54°20′20″N 24°36′40″E
- Country: Lithuania
- County: Alytus
- Municipality: Varėna
- Eldership: Jakėnų (Jakėnai)

Population (2011 Census)
  - Total: 10
- Time zone: UTC+2 (EET)
  - Summer (DST): UTC+3 (EEST)

Jakėnai is a village in Jakėnų eldership, Varėna district municipality, Alytus County, southeastern Lithuania. According to the 2001 census, the village had a population of 21 people. At the 2011 census, the population was 10.
