= Military Commandant's Offices Command =

- Karo komendantūrų valdyba
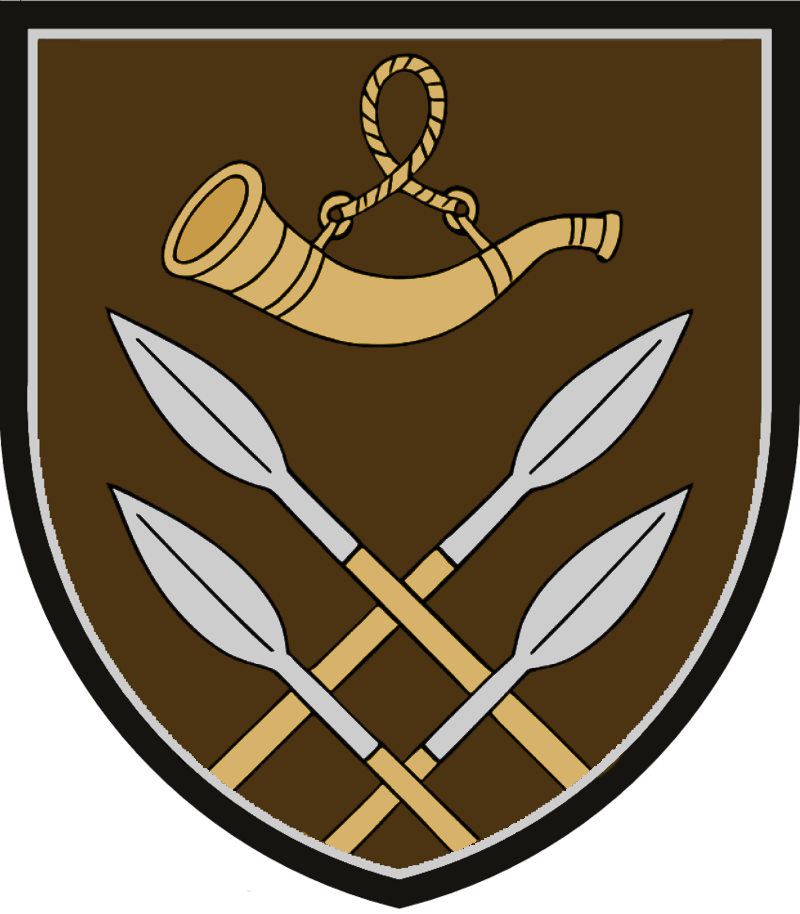
- Insignia of the Command
- Active: 2025 – present
- Country: Lithuania
- Branch: Joint (Lithuanian Armed Forces)
- Type: Territorial Defence Command
- Role: Military reserve force Infrastructure security Military recruitment
- Size: 10,600 reserve soldiers (wartime) 2,500 riflemen (wartime)
- Garrison/HQ: Vilnius
- Mottos: Garbė ginti! (Translation: "Honor to defend!")
- Website: karys.lt

Commanders
- Current commander: Colonel Danas Mockūnas

Insignia
- Battle flag

The Military Commandant's Offices Command (Lithuanian: Karo komendantūrų valdyba) is a territorial security-oriented formation in the Lithuanian Armed Forces, responsible for ensuring military order, security, and defense of critical infrastructure in the rear. It oversees the Military Commandant's Offices, which perform tasks such as facility protection, communication security, counter-sabotage operations, and maintaining order in designated areas.

The command also manages the mobilization process and supports national defense efforts through its structured territorial presence.

== History ==
=== Interwar Period ===
The position of military commandant in the Lithuanian Armed Forces was established at the very beginning of their formation in 1918. Military commandant offices held considerable authority in Lithuania during the interwar period, particularly during martial law. They functioned as both gendarmerie and military police.

=== Restoration of Independence ===
Since 1990, military commandant offices have operated in Lithuania under the Department of National Defense. Their responsibilities included overseeing the infrastructure of national defense units, providing information about the service and daily life of soldiers, recruiting young people into the armed forces, patrolling assigned territories, and carrying out guard duties at key facilities. Additionally, one of their most important tasks was assisting in the withdrawal of Russian troops from Lithuanian territory.

Within the commandant offices, commandant units were formed, where the first conscripts of the restored Lithuanian army underwent mandatory service. The commandant offices, as local administrative units, were dissolved in January 1993. On September 11, 1998, the Separate Commandant Battalion was reorganized into the Grand Duke Gediminas Staff Battalion.

=== Modern Era ===
In 2019, military commandant offices were reinstated in Lithuania as wartime decentralized structures, each operating without unified command. They were organized on a territorial basis and staffed with a commandant (professional), his deputy (military volunteer), and personnel from the Conscription and recruitment service, along with reservists.

In 2024, the then Minister of National Defense, Laurynas Kasčiūnas, ordered the reform of the military commandant system in peacetime, ensuring that it was staffed by professional soldiers. A new form of service, similar to the Volunteer Forces, was introduced, with more flexible requirements concerning service days, health, and appearance standards for soldiers. The training of reserve soldiers was assigned to the National Defense Volunteer Forces, with Colonel Danas Mockūnas appointed as the head of project.

On May 1, 2024, registration for volunteers in the newly structured military commandant offices opened. During the first registration period, from May 1 to August 31, 2024, 6,000 individuals signed up. Despite initial plans to temporarily close the registration, it was not halted. On November 13, 2024, the first soldiers of the military commandant offices took their oath.

On March 1, 2025, the Military Commandant Offices Command was established.

On April 27, 2026 Lithuanian Riflemen's Union announced the creation of 10 commandant's riflemen's battalions and conducted headquarters exercises at regional commandant's offices and Marijampolė district commandant's office. On October 5, 2026, the Lithuanian Public Security Service conducted joint training exercises with the 1st Vilnius Commandant's Riflemen's Battalion.

== Structure ==
The Military Commandant Offices Command consists of a headquarters and six regional military commandant offices located in Vilnius, Kaunas, Klaipėda, Šiauliai, Panevėžys, and Alytus. Each regional military commandant office is responsible for its city and district. Within the jurisdiction of the regional offices, municipal military commandant offices are subordinate to them. In municipalities with fewer than 10,000 residents, municipal military commandant offices are not established. Instead, they are overseen by the commandant office of a neighboring municipality. Only a deputy commandant and a infantry platoon are assigned to these smaller municipalities. Regional commandant offices are responsible for managing between 2 and 6 battalions, while municipal offices are tasked with managing a company.

Military Commandant's Offices Command, in Vilnius

- Command headquarters, in Vilnius
  - Command HQ Staff
    - Headquarters Company
    - Signals Company
  - Conscription and recruitment service
- Vilnius Regional Military Commandant Office, in Vilnius
  - Military Commandant Office Staff
  - Conscription Center
  - 1st Riflemen's Commandant Battalion
  - 2nd Riflemen's Commandant Battalion
  - 3rd Riflemen's Commandant Battalion
  - 4th Commandant Battalion
  - 5th Commandant Battalion
  - 6th Commandant Battalion
  - Ukmergė District Military Commandant Office
    - Military Commandant Office Staff
    - Conscription Branch
    - Commandant Company
  - Trakai District Military Commandant Office
    - Commandant Office Staff
    - Conscription Branch
    - Commandant Company
  - Švenčionys District Military Commandant Office
    - Military Commandant Office Staff
    - Conscription Branch
    - Commandant Company
  - Širvintos District Military Commandant Office
    - Commandant Office Staff
    - Conscription Branch
    - Commandant Company
  - Šalčininkai District Military Commandant Office
    - Military Commandant Office Staff
    - Conscription Branch
    - Commandant Company
  - Elektrėnai Military Commandant Office
    - Military Commandant Office Staff
    - Conscription Branch
    - Commandant Company
  - Molėtai District Military Commandant Office
    - Military Commandant Office Staff
    - Conscription Branch
    - Commandant Company
- Kaunas Regional Military Commandant Office, in Kaunas
  - Military Commandant Office Staff
  - Conscription Center
  - 1st Riflemen's Commandant Battalion
  - 2nd Riflemen's Commandant Battalion
  - 3rd Commandant Battalion (optional)
  - 4th Commandant Battalion (optional)
  - 5th Commandant Battalion (optional)
  - 6th Commandant Battalion (optional)
  - Birštonas Military Commandant Office
    - Military Commandant Office Staff
    - Conscription Branch
    - Commandant Company
  - Jonava District Military Commandant Office
    - Military Commandant Office Staff
    - Conscription Branch
    - Commandant Company
  - Kaišiadorys District Military Commandant Office
    - Military Commandant Office Staff
    - Conscription Branch
    - Commandant Company
  - Kėdainiai District Military Commandant Office
    - Military Commandant Office Staff
    - Conscription Branch
    - Commandant Company
  - Prienai District Military Commandant Office
    - Military Commandant Office Staff
    - Conscription Branch
    - Commandant Company
  - Raseiniai District Military Commandant Office
    - Military Commandant Office Staff
    - Conscription Branch
    - Commandant Company
  - Jurbarkas District Military Commandant Office
    - Military Commandant Office Staff
    - Conscription Branch
    - Commandant Company
- Klaipėda Regional Military Commandant Office, in Klaipėda
  - Military Commandant Office Staff
  - Conscription Center
  - 1st Riflemen's Commandant Battalion
  - 2nd Commandant Battalion
  - 3rd Commandant Battalion (optional)
  - 4th Commandant Battalion (optional)
  - 5th Commandant Battalion (optional)
  - 6th Commandant Battalion (optional)
  - Palanga City Military Commandant Office
    - Military Commandant's Office Staff
    - Conscription Branch
    - Commandant Company
  - Kretinga District Military Commandant Office
    - Military Commandant Office Staff
    - Conscription Branch
    - Commandant Company
  - Skuodas District Military Commandant Office
    - Military Commandant Office Staff
    - Conscription Branch
    - Commandant Company
  - Šilutė District Military Commandant Office
    - Military Commandant Office Staff
    - Conscription Branch
    - Commandant Company
  - Plungė District Military Commandant Office
    - Military Commandant Office Staff
    - Conscription Branch
    - Commandant Company
  - Tauragė District Military Commandant Office
    - Military Commandant Office Staff
    - Conscription Branch
    - Commandant Company
- Šiauliai Regional Military Commandant Office, in Šiauliai
  - Military Commandant Office Staff
  - Conscription Center
  - 1st Riflemen's Commandant Battalion
  - 2nd Commandant Battalion
  - 3rd Commandant Battalion (optional)
  - 4th Commandant Battalion (optional)
  - 5th Commandant Battalion (optional)
  - 6th Commandant Battalion (optional)
  - Radviliškis District Military Commandant Office
    - Military Commandant Office Staff
    - Conscription Branch
    - Commandant Company
  - Pakruojis District Military Commandant Office
    - Military Commandant Office Staff
    - Conscription Branch
    - Commandant Company
  - Kelmė District Military Commandant Office
    - Military Commandant Office Staff
    - Conscription Branch
    - Commandant Company
  - Joniškis District Military Commandant Office
    - Military Commandant Office Staff
    - Conscription Branch
    - Commandant Company
  - Akmenė District Military Commandant Office
    - Military Commandant Office Staff
    - Conscription Branch
    - Commandant Company
  - Telšiai District Military Commandant Office
    - Military Commandant Office Staff
    - Conscription Branch
    - Commandant Company
  - Mažeikiai Military Commandant Office
    - Military Commandant Staff
    - Conscription Branch
    - Commandant Company
- Alytus Regional Military Commandant, in Alytus
  - Military Commandant Office Staff
  - Conscription Center
  - 1st Riflemen's Commandant Battalion
  - 2nd Commandant Battalion
  - 3rd Commandant Battalion (optional)
  - 4th Commandant Battalion (optional)
  - 5th Commandant Battalion (optional)
  - 6th Commandant Battalion (optional)
  - Druskininkai Military Commandant Office
    - Military Commandant Office Staff
    - Conscription Branch
    - Commandant Company
  - Lazdijai District Military Commandant Office
    - Military Commandant Office Staff
    - Conscription Branch
    - Commandant Company
  - Varėna District Military Commandant Office
    - Military Commandant Office Staff
    - Conscription Branch
    - Commandant Company
  - Marijampolė District Military Commandant Office
    - Military Commandant Office Staff
    - Conscription Branch
    - 1st Riflemen's Commandant Battalion
  - Vilkaviškis District Military Commandant Office
    - Military Commandant Office Staff
    - Conscription Branch
    - Commandant Company
- Panevėžys Regional Military Commandant Office, in Panevėžys
  - Military Commandant Office Staff
  - Conscription Center
  - 1st Riflemen's Commandant Battalion
  - 2nd Commandant Battalion
  - 3rd Commandant Battalion (optional)
  - 4th Commandant Battalion (optional)
  - 5th Commandant Battalion (optional)
  - 6th Commandant Battalion (optional)
  - Rokiškis District Military Commandant Office
    - Military Commandant Office Staff
    - Conscription Branch
    - Commandant Company
  - Pasvalys District Military Commandant Office
    - Military Commandant Office Staff
    - Conscription Branch
    - Commandant Company
  - Biržai District Military Commandant Office
    - Military Commandant Office Staff
    - Conscription Branch
    - Commandant Company
  - Utena District Military Commandant Office
    - Military Commandant Office Staff
    - Conscription Branch
    - Commandant Company
  - Visaginas Military Commandant Office
    - Military Commandant Office Staff
    - Conscription Branch
    - Commandant Company
  - Zarasai District Military Commandant Office
    - Military Commandant Office Staff
    - Conscription Branch
    - Commandant Company
  - Anykščiai District Military Commandant Office
    - Military Commandant Office Staff
    - Conscription Branch
    - Commandant Company

== See also ==
- Lithuanian National Defence Volunteer Forces
- Lithuanian Riflemen's Union

== See also ==
- Lesčius, Vytautas (1998). "Lietuvos miestų ir apskričių karo komendantūros 1918–1920 metais" (PDF). Karo archyvas (in Lithuanian). 15.
