= Suwałki Region =

Coordinates: 54°06′00″N 22°56′00″E

Suwałki Region Suwalszczyzna
- Historical region
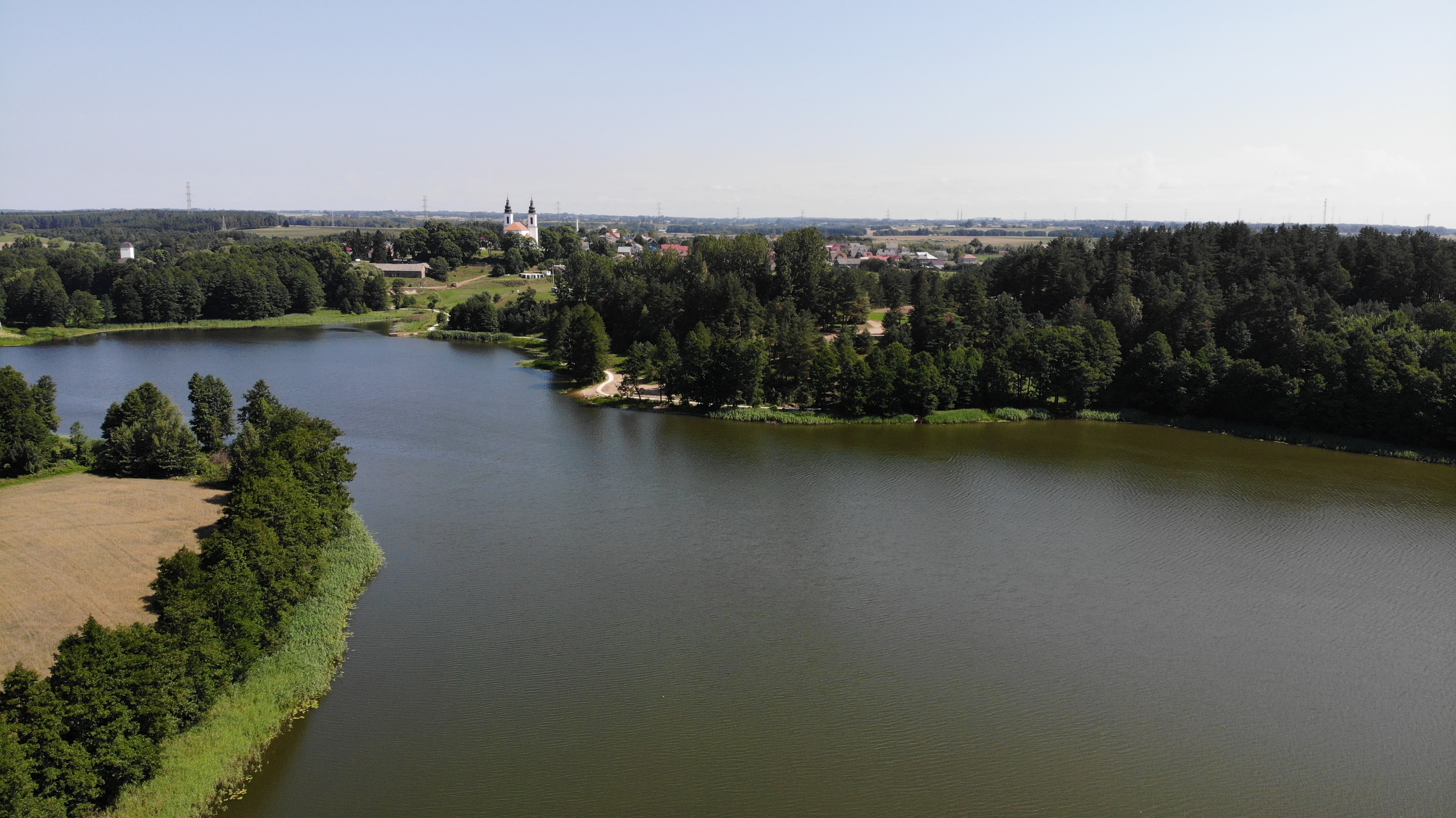
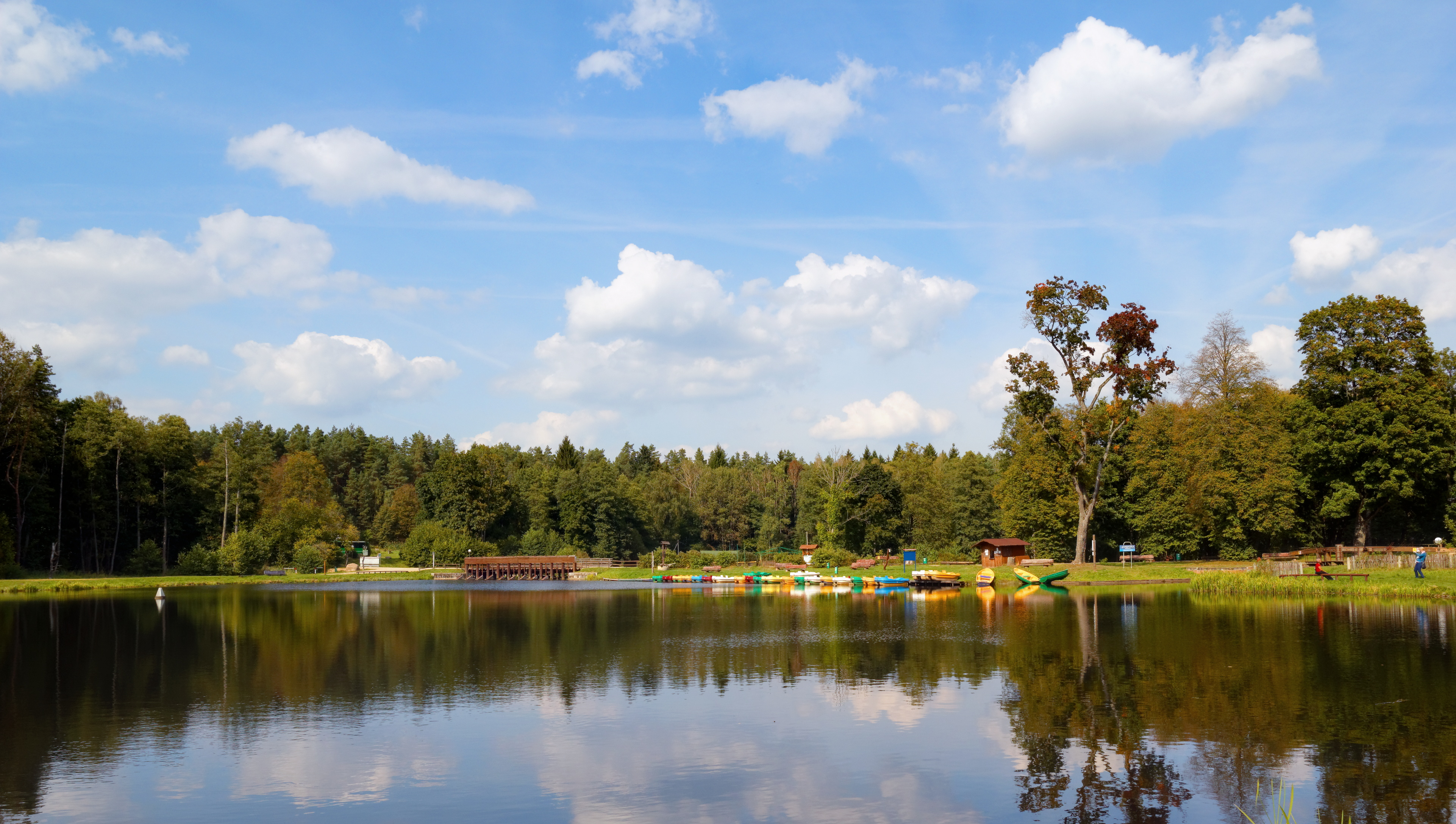
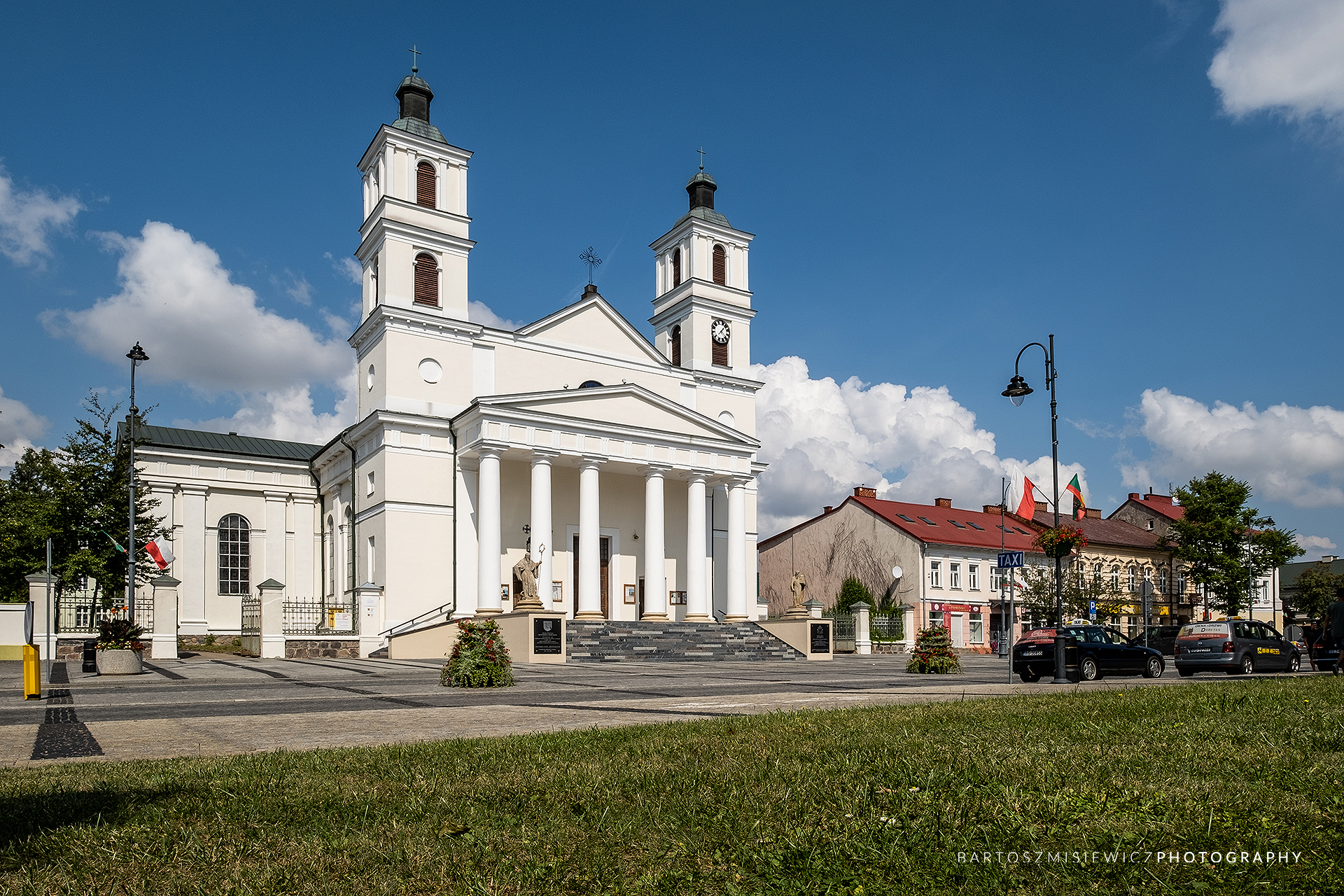
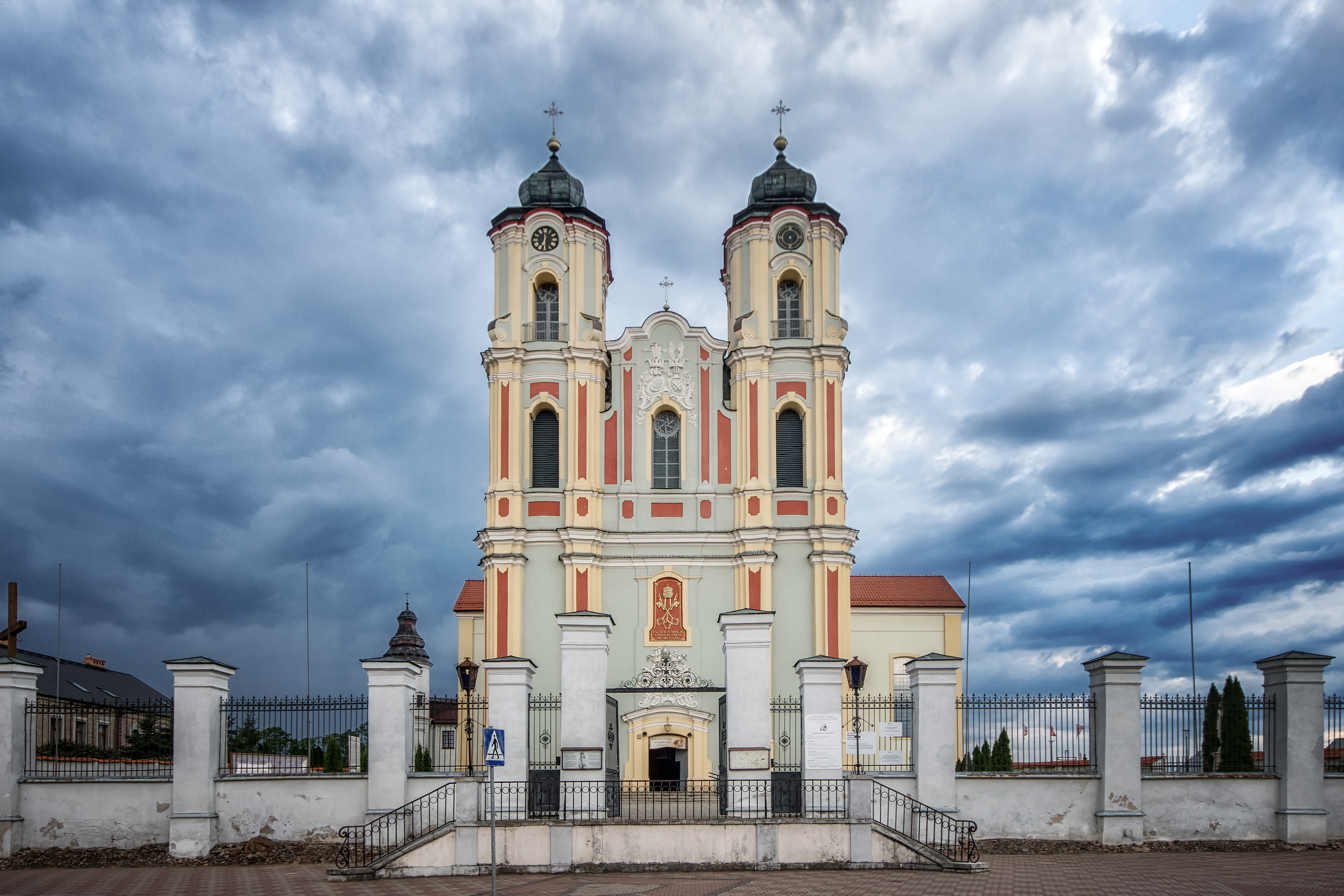
- From top, left to right: Sumowo Bakałarzewskie Lake and Bakałarzewo; Augustów Canal; Saint Alexander Co-Cathedral in Suwałki; Basilica of the Visitation in Sejny

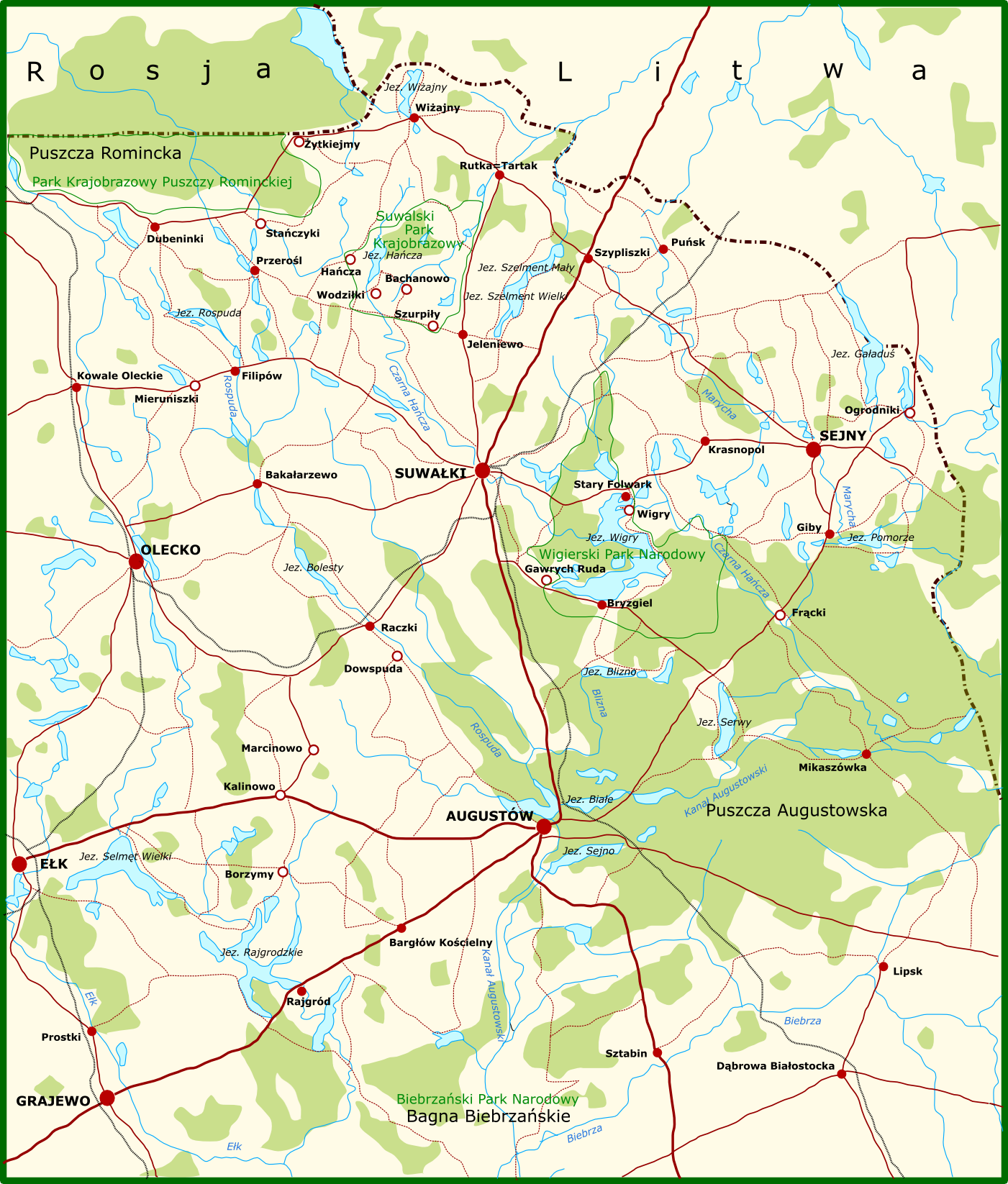
- A map of the Suwałki Region, with towns, roads and forest areas
- Country: Poland
- Capital: Suwałki
- Time zone: UTC+1 (CET)
  - Summer (DST): UTC+2 (CEST)

Suwałki Region (Polish: Suwalszczyzna^{[a]} [suvalʂt͡ʂɨzna]; Lithuanian: Suvalkų kraštas, Suvalkija) is a historical region around the city of Suwałki in northeastern Poland near the border with Lithuania. It encompasses the powiats of Augustów, Suwałki, and Sejny, and roughly corresponds to the southern part of the former Suwałki Governorate.

The region was disputed between Poland and Lithuania after their re-emergence as independent states following World War I. This dispute along with the Vilnius question was the cause of the Polish–Lithuanian War and the Sejny Uprising. The area has since been part of Poland, with the exception of the German and Soviet occupation during World War II. The Suwałki Region remains as the center of the Lithuanian minority in Poland.

Historical affiliations of the region (including occupations during world wars)

Yotvingians until 14th century
Grand Duchy of Lithuania 1400s–1569
Polish–Lithuanian Commonwealth 1569–1795
Kingdom of Prussia 1795–1807
Duchy of Warsaw 1807–1815
Congress Poland 1815–1867
Vistula Land 1867–1915
Ober Ost 1915–1919 (occupation)
Second Polish Republic and Lithuania, contested during 1919–1920
Second Polish Republic 1920–1939
Nazi Germany/Soviet Union 1939–1941 (occupation)
Nazi Germany 1941–1944 (occupation)
Polish People's Republic 1944–1989
Poland 1989–present

== History ==
The Neolithic era ushered in the first settled agricultural communities in the area of present-day Poland, whose founders had migrated from the Danube River area beginning about 5500 BC. Later, the native post-Mesolithic populations adopted and further developed the agricultural way of life, between 4400 and about 2000 BC. During Polish antiquity and the Polish Early Middle Ages, the northeast corner of what is now Poland was populated by West Baltic tribes. They were at the outer limits of any substantial cultural influence from the Roman Empire.

=== Middle Ages ===
After the local Yotvingians were eradicated or Germanized by the Teutonic Order in the 14th century, their southern lands were repopulated by Poles, Belarusians, and Ukrainians. Their northern territories of Suvalkija remained largely void of settlement until the 16th century, when Lithuanians began to migrate into the area.

=== Early modern era ===
The region belonged, either fully or partially, to the Grand Duchy of Lithuania, within the Polish–Lithuanian union until 1569. Afterwards it was divided between the Grand Duchy and the Crown of the Kingdom of Poland, both forming the Polish–Lithuanian Commonwealth.^{[b]}

=== 19th century ===
Modern Lithuanian borders superimposed on the Suwałki Governorate, in yellow

Following the Third Partition of Poland, the whole region belonged to the Kingdom of Prussia from 1795 to 1807. It then belonged to the Duchy of Warsaw from 1808 to 1815.

In 1815, the Suwałki Region became part of Congress Poland, a state which was tied by personal union to Russia and absorbed by the Russian Empire in the aftermath of the 1830 November Uprising. The Suwałki Governorate, in a Russian census conducted during the 1880s, was about 58% Lithuanian. Most of its territory is now part of Lithuania, with only three uyezds, Augustów, Suwałki, and Sejny, partially located in Poland.

The 1897 Russian Census recorded the linguistic composition of local towns:

- Augustów – Polish (46.2%), Jewish (28.5%), Russian (18.7%), Lithuanian (0.2%);
- Suwałki – Polish (38.7% ), Jewish (32.9%), Russian, (21.6%), Lithuanian (0.5%);
- Sejny – Jewish (50.8%), Polish (40.4%), Lithuanian (4.2%), Russian (2.5%).

The three corresponding uyezds (counties) had the following population, by language:

- Augustów Uyezd – Polish (49.1%), Belarusian (32.5%), Jewish (11.6%), Russian (5.4%), Lithuanian (0.2%);
- Suwałki Uyezd – Polish (66.8%), Jewish (11.3%), Lithuanian (8.5%), Russian (7.9%), German (4.3%);
- Sejny Uyezd – Lithuanian (59.6%), Polish (22.9%), Jewish (11.8%), Russian (4.4%), German (1.2%).^{[c]}

The town of Sejny was located on the Polish-Lithuanian ethno-linguistic boundary.

=== World War I ===
During World War I, the region was captured by the German army and incorporated into Ober Ost. In the German census of 1916, Poles constituted 86.6% of the inhabitants in the Augustów Kreis (district) and 74.2% in the Suwałki Kreis. Lithuanians accounted for 0.3% and 9.6% respectively. The Sejny Kreis had a Lithuanian majority of 51%. Poles made up 43.3% of the population.

=== Interwar period ===
Poland's sovereignty was restored in the wake of World War I, but its eastern borders were not settled. The Suwałki Region was claimed by re-established independent Lithuania, based on cultural heritage and later 1920 peace treaty with Soviet Russia.

In November 1918, the German forces allowed the establishment of Polish civilian administration in the form of the Provisional Citizens' Council (Polish: Tymczasowa Rada Obywatelska Okręgu Suwalskiego, TROOS^{[d]}). They permitted elections to the Polish Legislative Sejm, which took place on 16 February 1919. Nevertheless, the German military saw further strengthening of Polish aspirations as disadvantageous and in March 1919 handed control over the area to the Lithuanian Taryba. In May 1919, units of the Lithuanian army joined German troops in Suwałki and Sejny.

In July 1919, the Entente ordered the German army to leave the Suwałki Region, and adopted the Foch Line as a temporary demarcation line between Poland and Lithuania. The line left on the Polish side: the counties of Suwałki and Augustów, the town of Sejny, and four communes^{[e]} (gminas) of the Sejny county: Krasnopol, Krasnowo, Berżniki, and Giby.

The Lithuanian army left the region in July–August 1919, after the Entente's decision and the Sejny Uprising. They returned a year later, during the Polish Army's retreat from advancing Soviets. In September 1920, the Poles forced the Lithuanians to withdraw behind the Foch Line.

The Foch line coincided approximately with the eastern ethnic boundary of Lithuania. It evolved into the future Polish–Lithuanian border, which was internationally recognized in 1923, while being rejected by the Lithuanian government. A small ethnically Lithuanian area (north of Sejny (Lithuanian: Seinai) and around Puńsk^{[f]} (Lithuanian: Punskas)) was left under Polish control. The Suwałki section of the Polish–Lithuanian border remained unchanged after World War II.

During the Interwar period, the Lithuanian authorities claimed that the region consisted of three counties (see administrative divisions of Lithuania), that were illegally occupied by Poland.

These included:

- Augustavo Apskritis based in the town of Augustów (Lithuanian: Augustavas);
- Suvalkų Apskritis formed around the city of Suwałki (Lithuanian: Suvalkai);
- Seinų Apskritis centered on the town of Sejny (Lithuanian: Seinai).

The aforementioned units roughly correspondended to the actual administrative division of the area into powiats of Augustów, Suwałki and Sejny of the Białystok Voivodeship of Poland, respectively. The region was the least economically developed part of Poland in the interwar period.

=== World War II ===
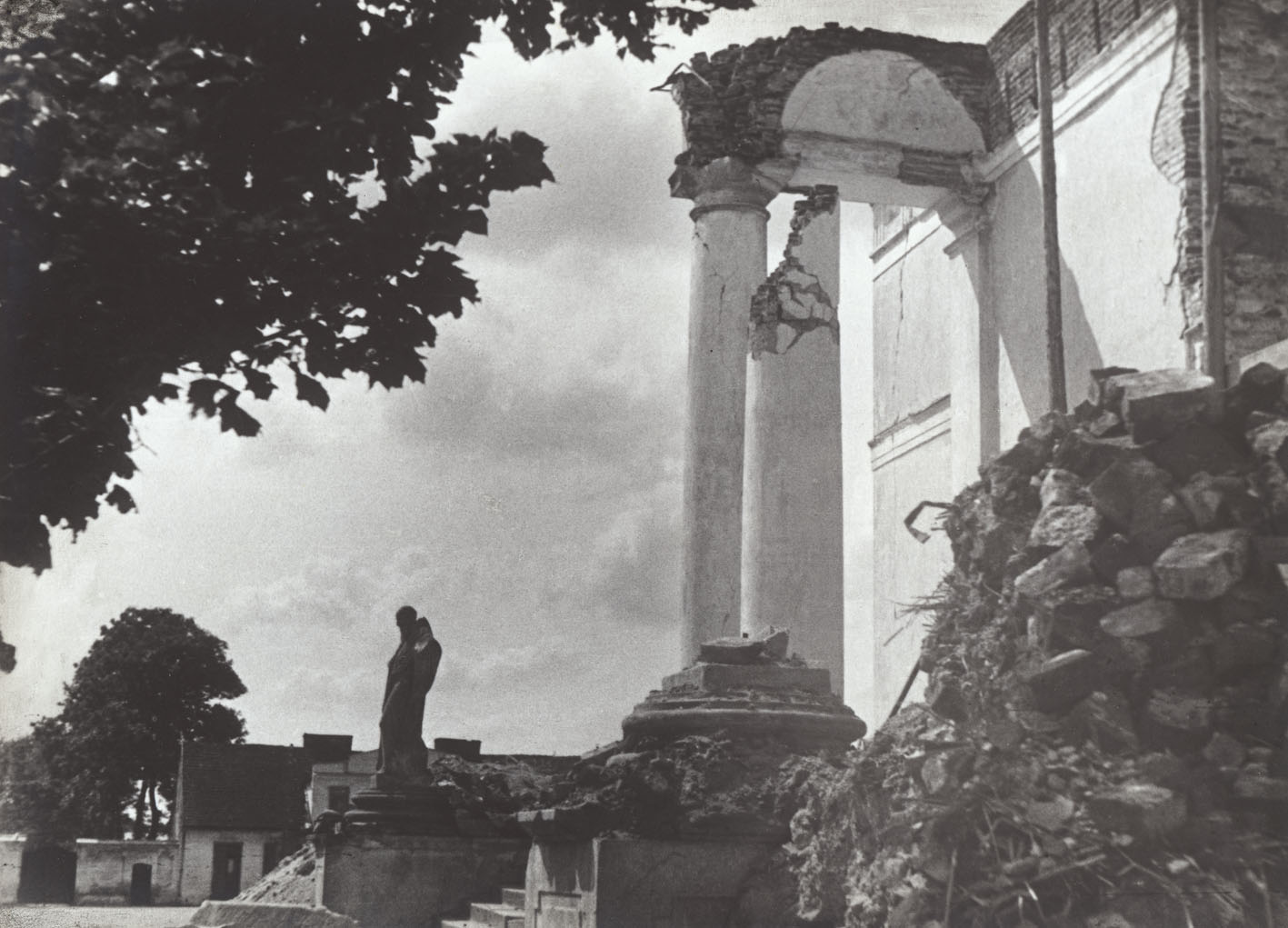
World War II destruction in Suwałki

Following the joint German-Soviet invasion of Poland, which started World War II in September 1939, most of the Suwałki Region was annexed by Nazi Germany and adjoined to the province of East Prussia. A small part, including the town of Lipsk was occupied by the Soviet Union until 1941. Under German occupation, the Polish population was subjected to the genocidal Intelligenzaktion campaign, which included mass arrests, massacres, deportations to forced labour and concentration camps, and expulsions, while in the Soviet-occupied part the Russians carried out deportations of Poles into the USSR. In April 1940, the Germans carried out mass deportations of local Polish intelligentsia to concentration camps, including Soldau, Sachsenhausen and Dachau.

=== Modern period ===
After World War II, Poland regained control over the territory. The area was administratively part of the Białystok Voivodeship until 1975, then the Suwałki Voivodeship until 1998, and since 1999 it is located in the Podlaskie Voivodeship.

The area is still inhabited by the Lithuanian minority. Lithuanians are concentrated in the Sejny County^{[g]} where they accounted for 20.2% of the population in 2011 and exceeded 10% of the inhabitants in two communes – Gmina Puńsk (73.4%) and Gmina Sejny (15.5%). There are Lithuanian schools and cultural societies present in the Suwałki region and the Lithuanian language is spoken in the offices in the commune of Puńsk.

== Countryside ==
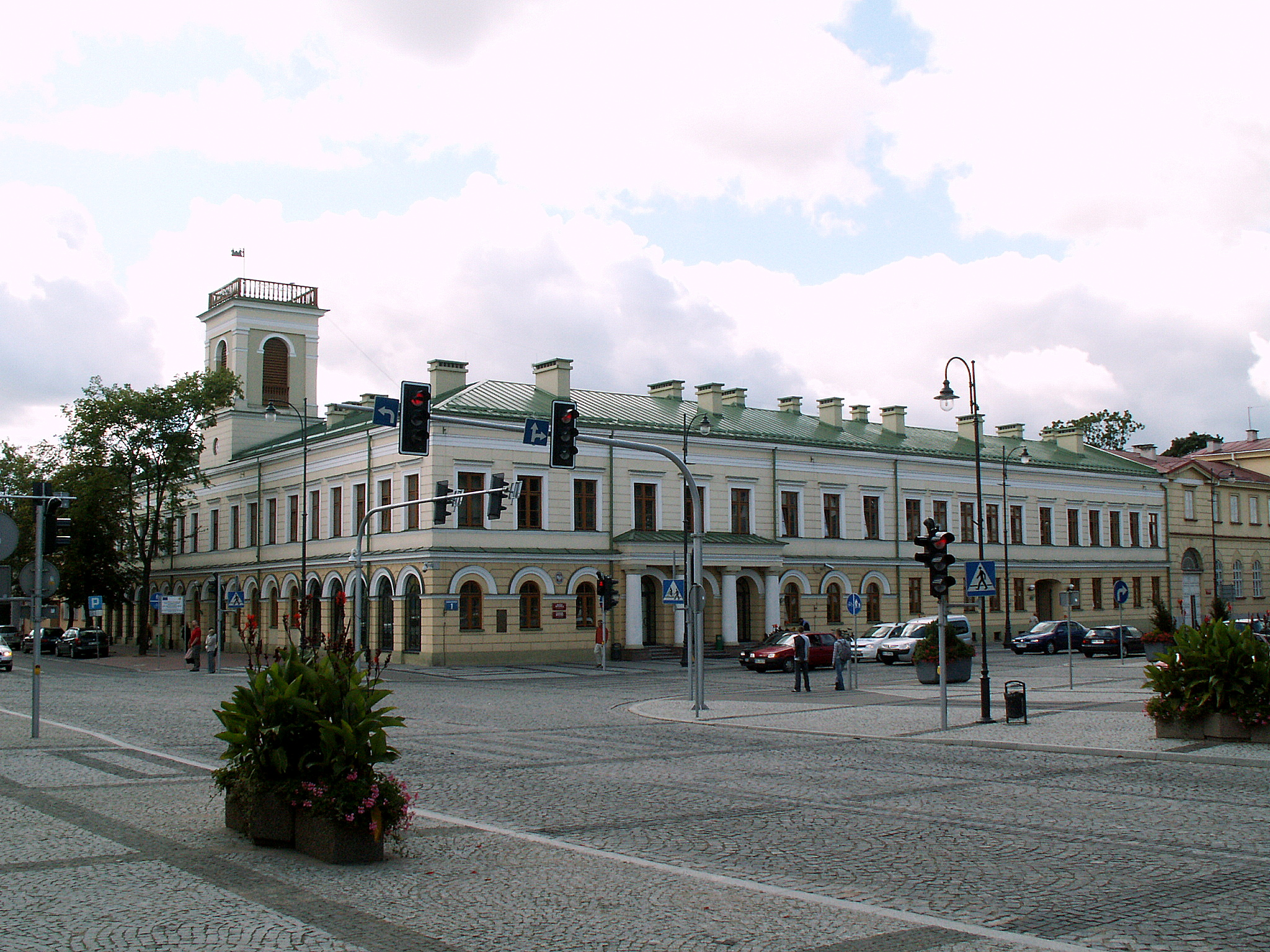
City Hall in Suwałki, the largest city and capital of the region

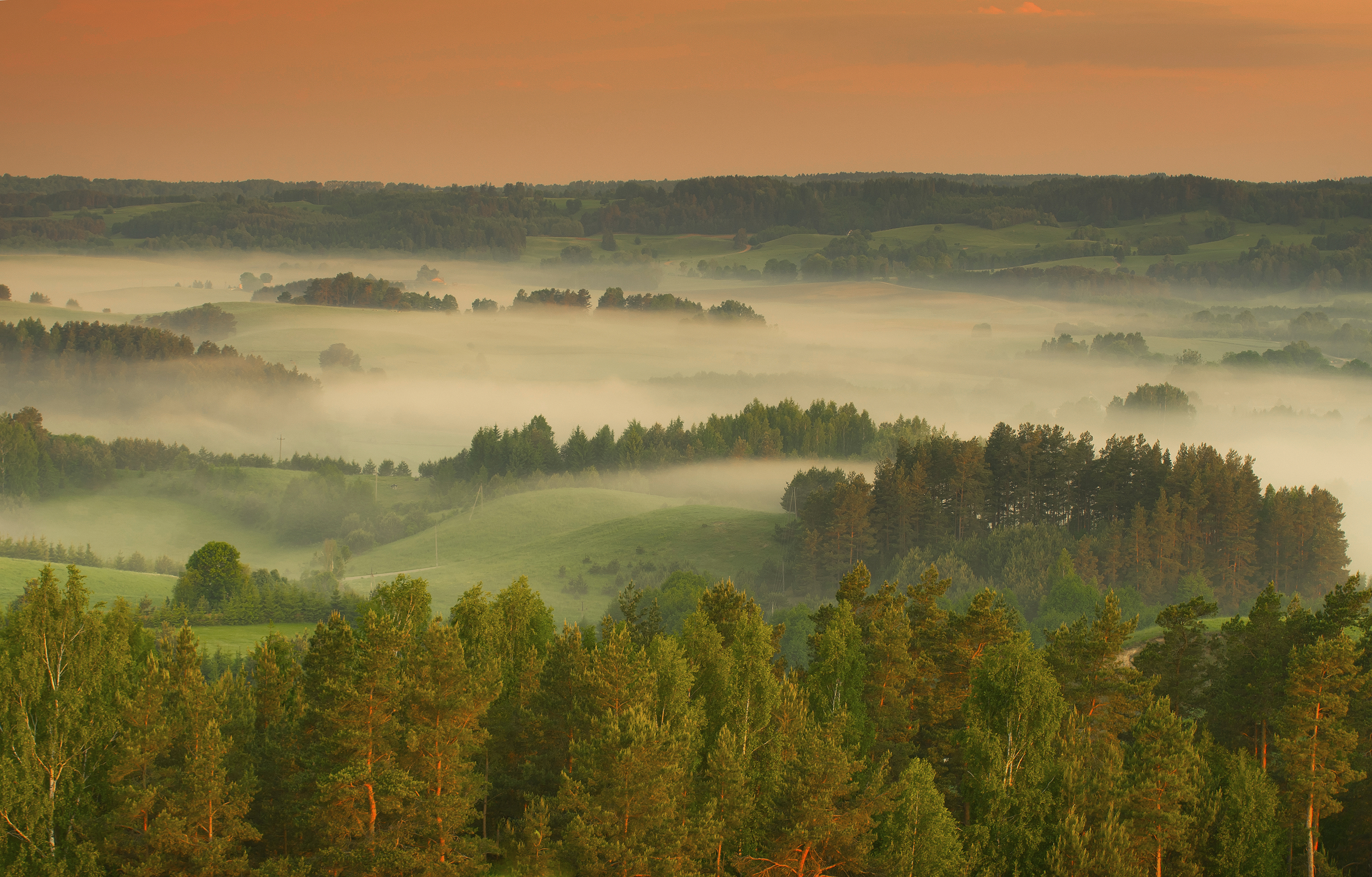
Suwałki Landscape Park

The Suwałki Region has many lakes and forests and is considered a relatively undeveloped region in Poland.

Towns:

- Suwałki
- Augustów
- Sejny
- Lipsk

Forests:

- Augustów Primeval Forest
- Romincka Forest

Lakes:

- Hańcza
- Wigry Lake
- Kojle

Parks:

- Biebrza National Park
- Puszcza Romincka Landscape Park
- Suwałki Landscape Park
- Wigry National Park

== See also ==
- Lithuanians in Poland
- Demographics of Poland
- Polish-Lithuanian War
- Suwałki County
- Vilnius Region
- Suwałki Gap

== Notes ==
a The Polish term Suwalszczyzna was formed in the second half of the 19th century to describe the territory of the Suwałki Governorate. In its narrowest sense, it may also refer to the area of the Suwałki powiat.

b Parts of the Augustów powiat (including the area of modern town of Augustów) belonged, with some breaks, to Mazovia (from the mid-13th c. to 1409). After 1569, Augustów was transferred to the Crown and absorbed by the Augustów starostwo (Polish: starostwo augustowskie).

c Buchowski gives the following data: Lithuanians – 60%, Poles – 20%, Jews – 16%, Germans – 3%, Russians – 1%.

d TROOS encompassed the counties of Augustów, Suwałki, and Sejny.

e Most of the Sejny county (10 out of 14 communes) remained on the Lithuanian side of the line.

f Puńsk had a Jewish majority in the late 19th century and was inhabited mainly by Jews in the interwar period. Today both Puńsk and Gmina Puńsk have Lithuanian majorities.

g According to the Polish census of 2002, 90% of Lithuanians lived in the areas close to the Polish-Lithuanian border and nearly 60% of them resided in Gmina Puńsk. The 2011 census, which allowed respondents to declare double national and ethnic identity, found that 49% of the people who declared Lithuanian nationality (either as their first or second identity) lived in Gmina Puńsk and Gmina Sejny (3,846 out of 7,863).

== Sources ==
- Simas Sužiedēlis, Encyclopedia Lituanica, J. Kapočius 1978
- Timothy Snyder, The Reconstruction of Nations: Poland, Ukraine, Lithuania, Belarus, 1569-1999, Yale University Press 2003, page 33
- United States Congress Select Committee on Communist Aggression, Baltic States: A Study of Their Origin and National Development, WS Hein 1972, page 71
