= Foch Line =

Border demarcation between Poland and Lithuania after World War I

Various proposals for the Polish-Lithuanian border after World War I. Foch Line in dark green, modern borders in pink.

The Foch Line was a temporary demarcation line between Poland and Lithuania proposed by the Entente in the aftermath of World War I. The line was proposed by Marshal of France Ferdinand Foch, which was discussed only with Polish side, was accepted by the Conference of Ambassadors in 1919. After the Polish–Lithuanian War, with small adjustments the line formed the basis of the inter-war Polish-Lithuanian border. The line left Vilnius on the Polish side. After World War II only its westernmost part, close to the town of Suwałki, follows the line.

== Bibliography ==
- Alfonsas Eidintas; Vytautas Tuskenis Zalys; Edvardas Tuskenis (1 October 1999). Lithuania in European Politics: The Years of the First Republic, 1918-1940. Palgrave Macmillan. p. 72. ISBN 978-0-312-22458-5.

== See also ==
- Curzon Line
- Polish-Lithuanian War
- Suwałki Agreement
- Sejny Uprising
