= Chana =

Chana, chhana, or chaná may refer to:

== Food ==
- Chickpea, known in South Asia as chana
- Chhana, a type of curds from South Asia

== Places ==
- Chana, Illinois, United States, an unincorporated community
- Chana District, Songkhla Province, southern Thailand

== Other uses ==
- Chang'an Motors commercial vehicles sub-brand known as Chana, a Chinese automaker
- Chaná people, an ethnic group of Uruguay
- Chaná language, an extinct language of Uruguay and Argentina
- Chana (Bible), alternate transliteration of Hannah, a Biblical character; sometimes spelled "Chane"
- Woman with seven sons, a character in 2 Maccabees, sometimes called Chana
- Rosanna Tavarez, an American singer who used Chana as a stage name

== People with the name ==
- Ameet Chana (born 1975), British-Indian actor
- Arjan Drayton Chana (born 1994), English field hockey player
- Chana Blaksztejn, a Polish-Jewish writer and journalist
- Chana Bloch (1940–2017), American poet, translator, and scholar
- Chana Eden (1932–2019), Israeli-American actress and singer
- Chana Joffe-Walt, radio journalist and producer
- Chana Katan (born 1958), American-born Israeli gynecologist, and public figure
- Chana Kowalska (1907–1942), Polish painter and journalist
- Chana Masson (born 1978), Brazilian handball player
- Chana Orloff (1888–1968), Ukraine-born sculptor
- Chana Pilane-Majake, South African politician
- Chana Porpaoin (born 1966), Thai boxer
- Chana Schneerson (1880–1964), wife of a Chabad Hasidic rabbi in Ukraine
- Chana Timoner (1951–1998), American rabbi
- Khuli Chana (born 1982), South African Motswako rapper
- Navjot Chana (born 1983), Indian martial artist
- Pindi Chana (born 1974), Tanzanian politician
- Tarlochan Singh Chana (born 1949), Kenyan field hockey player

== See also ==
- Hannah (name)
- Chanas (disambiguation)
- Chano (disambiguation)
- Channa (disambiguation)
- Chana School
