= 1922 Republic of Central Lithuania general election =

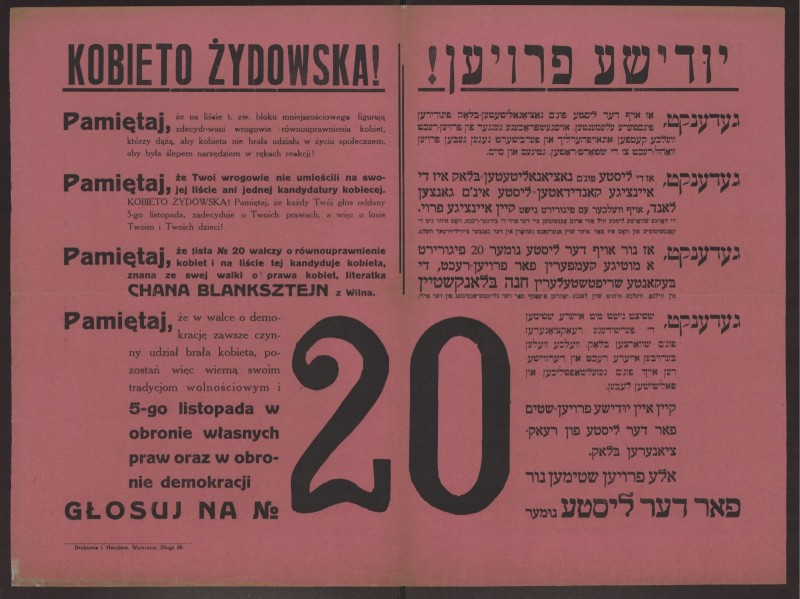
1922 poster promoting the Jewish Democratic People's Block and Chana Blaksztejn for member of parliament of Central Lithuania in the 1922 elections

An election to the Vilnius Sejm (parliament) of the Polish-dominated Republic of Central Lithuania was held on 8 January 1922. The new parliament was intended to formally legalize incorporation of Central Lithuania into Poland. Such measure was fiercely opposed by Lithuania, which claimed the territory for itself. The election was boycotted by non-Polish population and its results were unrecognized by either the Lithuanian government in Kaunas or the League of Nations. The elected parliament convened in February and, as expected, voted on 20 February 1922 to have the Republic incorporated into Poland. At the end of March 1922, Central Lithuania became Wilno Land of the Second Polish Republic.

== Background ==
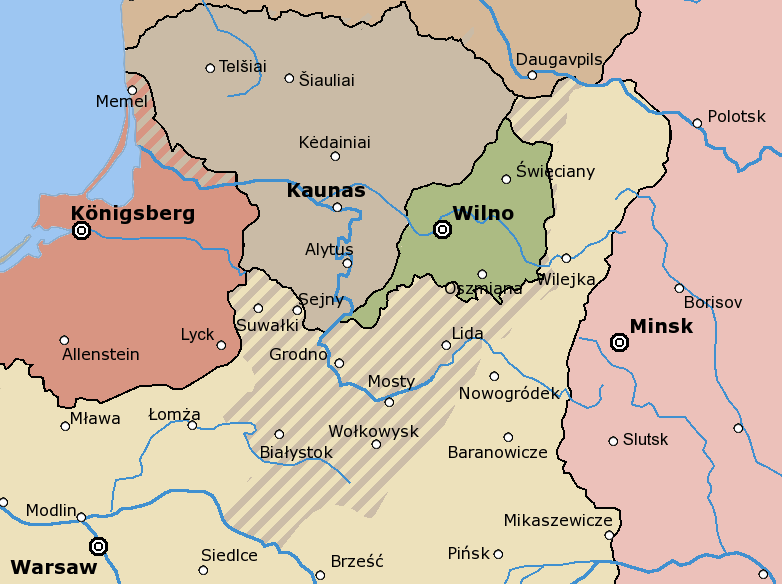
The Republic of Central Lithuania (shown in green)

In the aftermath of the Żeligowski's Mutiny aimed against Lithuania, a new state was created by general Lucjan Żeligowski in Vilnius Region in October 1920. The new Republic of Central Lithuania depended on Poland's economic and military support and was governed by Polish military. The territory was fiercely contested by Lithuania and Poland. In demographic terms the city of Vilnius was the least Lithuanian of Lithuanian cities, divided nearly evenly between Poles and Jews, with ethnic Lithuanians constituting a mere fraction of the total population (about 2–3% of the population, according to Russian 1897 and German 1916 censuses). The Lithuanians nonetheless believed that their historical claim to the city (former capital of the Grand Duchy of Lithuania) had precedence and refused to recognize any Polish claims to the city and the surrounding area.

The League of Nations mediated the dispute and strongly advocated a plebiscite where the local population would vote to be incorporated either into Poland or Lithuania. However, neither Poland nor Lithuania wanted the vote. Poland had control of the territory and saw no reason to jeopardize the status quo, especially since it had already lost two plebiscites against Germany (in East Prussia and Upper Silesia). Lithuania did not want to recognize that Poland had a legitimate claim to the region and was afraid to lose the vote, especially if Polish military remained in the region. As both sides stalled, the plebiscite idea was abandoned in March 1921. Poland and Lithuania entered direct negotiations under mediation of Paul Hymans. He prepared two projects that envisioned a Polish–Lithuanian union, but both of them were rejected by Poland and Lithuania by December 1921. In October 1921, after the failure of the negotiations, the Republic of Central Lithuania scheduled elections for 8 January 1922.

== Preparations ==
The territory, where elections were to take place, was carved out to maximize the number of Polish residents; for example, Polish-inhabited regions of Lida and Braslaw were included while Lithuanian-inhabited areas around Druskininkai were excluded. According to official Polish election reports, 735,089 people lived in the designated election territory. Of them 11.5% were Jews, 8.8% were Belarusians, and 7.2% were Lithuanians. Requirements for the candidates to the parliament included age (at least 25 years of age), education (at least primary school), and language (good knowledge of Polish). Polish authorities formally allowed freedoms of press and of assembly, but provided up to one year in prison for campaigning against the election. This provision was aimed at the Lithuanians, who decided to boycott the elections. The Lithuanian government protested the election and even attempted to revive the idea of the plebiscite under supervision of the League of Nations, but the League was done mediating the Polish–Lithuanian dispute.

Only Polish parties and groups proposed candidates for the election. The right-wing parties advocated for unconditional incorporation into Poland while left-wing sought a special autonomous status with Poland. There was a significant propaganda campaign before the elections. The Lithuanians attempted to win support from the Jewish and Belarusian communities. The Jews generally leaned towards Lithuania, which was seen as more tolerant and more willing to make concessions for the support. However, at the same time, Jews were afraid that support of the Lithuanian cause would be interpreted to be a hostile act against Poland and could worsen their position.

== Results ==
63.9% of the entire population took part in the voting, but among different ethnic groups the attendance was lower (41% of Belarusians, 15.3% of Jews and 8.2% of Lithuanians). Jewish turnout varied greatly from rural (37.8%) to urban areas (6.3%). In Vilnius, the Jewish turnout was only 1.4%. The two largest political groups in the new parliament were the Association of National Parties and Organizations with 43 seats and the Popular Councils with 34 seats. All the other groups gained 28 seats altogether.

Party	Seats
Association of National Parties and Organizations	43
Popular Councils	34
Polish People's Party of Wilno Land	13
Popular Association "Odrodzenie-Wyzwolenie"	6
Democratic Party	4
Popular Association "Odrodzenie"	3
Polish Socialist Party of Lithuania and Belarus	3
Total	106
Source: KPBC

These results were disputed by Col. Chardigny, the Chief of the Military Inter-Allied Commission of Control sent by League of Nations, who officially declared that results are not valid, as most of the Lithuanians, Jews and Belarusians boycotted the elections, and there was use of military force. As a result of electoral malpractice such as not asking for valid voter identification, noted by delegates from the League of Nations, the elections were not recognized. On 13 January 1922 the Council of the League of Nations issued a statement that the elected parliament was not a legal representative of the local population.

== Aftermath ==
The parliament gathered on 1 February 1922. On 20 February it voted for formal incorporation into Poland and dispatched a delegation to Poland. The Polish Sejm passed the law proposed by the Central Lithuanian parliament on 22 March 1922 and two days later the Republic of Central Lithuania ceased to exist. All of its territory was incorporated into the newly formed Wilno Voivodeship. The border changes were accepted by the Conference of Ambassadors of the Entente and the League of Nations. Lithuania declined to accept the Polish authority over the area and continued to treat the region as part of its own territory and Vilnius as its legitimate capital, with Kaunas designated only as a temporary seat of government. The Polish–Lithuanian diplomatic relations were not restored until the Polish ultimatum to Lithuania in 1938.
