= Sejm of Central Lithuania =

Short-lived legislature

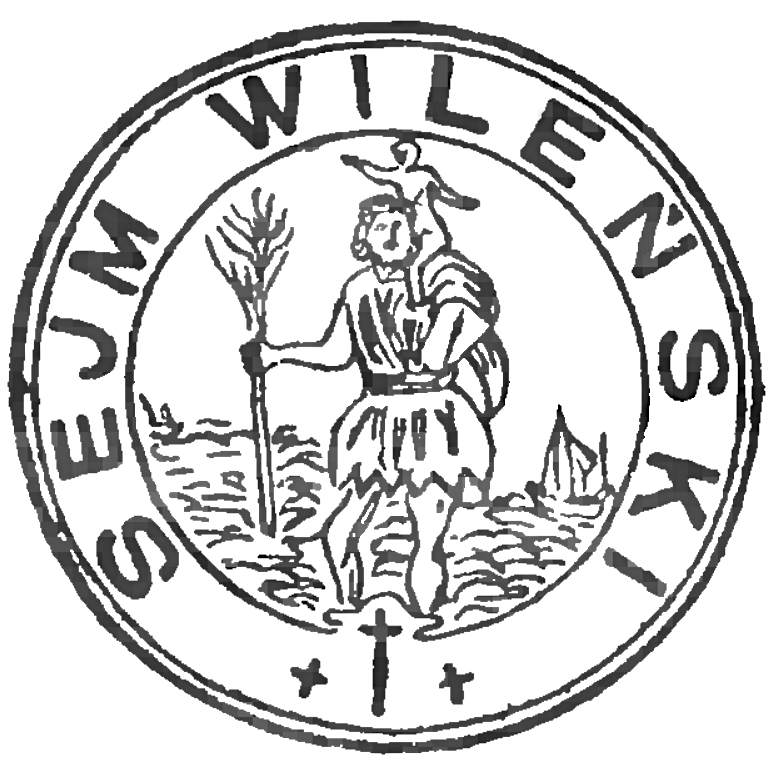
The 1922 seal of the Sejm of Central Lithuania.

The Sejm of Central Lithuania (Polish: Sejm Litwy Środkowej), also known as the Vilnius Sejm, or Wilno Sejm (Polish: Sejm Wileński; Lithuanian: Vilniaus seimas) or the Adjudicating Sejm (Polish: Sejm Orzekający), was the parliament of the short-lived state of Central Lithuania. Formed after the elections of 8 January 1922, it held its proceedings from 1 February to 1 March of that year. It had 106 deputies. Dominated by Polish representatives, it requested Central Lithuania's annexation by Poland and dissolved shortly afterward.

== Background ==
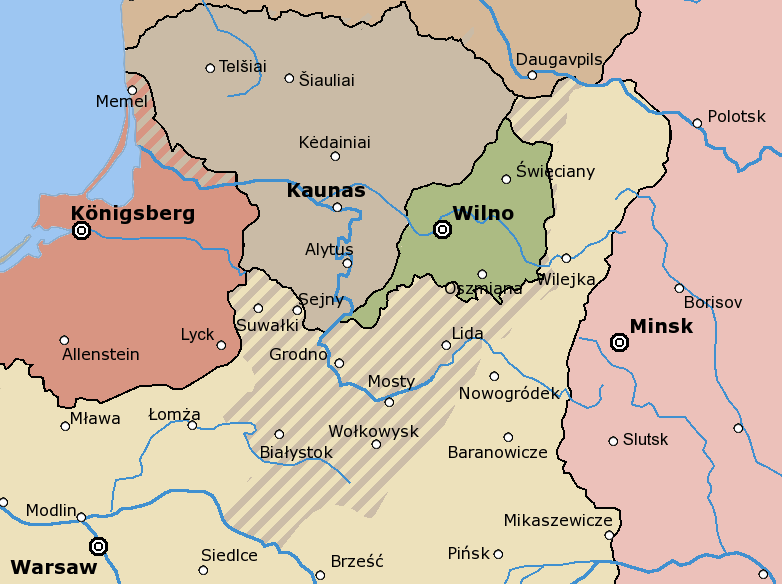
The Republic of Central Lithuania (shown in green)

In the aftermath of the Żeligowski's Mutiny aimed against Lithuania, a new state was created by general Lucjan Żeligowski in Vilnius Region in October 1920. The new Republic of Central Lithuania depended on Poland's economic and military support and was governed by Polish military representatives.

== Elections ==
The 1922 Republic of Central Lithuania general election of 8 January was mostly boycotted by non-Polish minorities (in particular, Lithuanians), although still saw an over 60% voters turnout. The two largest political groups in the new parliament were the Association of National Parties and Organizations with 43 seats and the Popular Councils with 34 seats. All the other groups gained 28 seats altogether. The list of all seats in parliament included:

- Association of National Parties and Organizations (43)
- Popular Councils (34)
- Polish People's Party of Wilno Land (13)
- Democratic Party (4)
- Popular Association "Odrodzenie-Wyzwolenie" (5)
- Popular Association "Odrodzenie" (3)
- Polish Socialist Party of Lithuania and Belarus (3)

The total number of deputies according to the majority of sources was 106.

Composition of the Sejm after the election of 1922 Association of National Parties and Organizations: 43 seats Popular Councils: 34 seats Polish People's Party of Wilno Land: 13 seats Democratic Party: 4 seats Popular Association "Odrodzenie-Wyzwolenie": 5 seats Popular Association "Odrodzenie": 3 seats Polish Socialist Party of Lithuania and Belarus: 3 seats Unknown: 1 seat

During the term, the Peasant Group of Popular Councils had broken away from the Popular Councils, forming a new party, and taking with it 7 seats.

== Proceedings ==
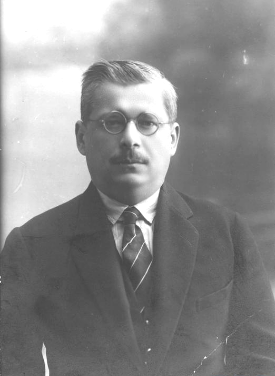
Antoni Łokuciewski, marshal of the Sejm of Central Lithuania

The Sejm held its proceedings from 1 February to 1 March of that year. The marshal of the Sejm, elected on 3 February, was Antoni Łokuciewski. Much of the parliament's time was taken with the discussions on the future of Central Lithuania in relation to its neighbour, Poland. After few weeks of debate, with only a minority supporting a federal solution, the most important decision of the Sejm was passed: a request for annexation by Poland, passed on 20 February (96 in favor, 6 opposed, 10 abstaining). It was executed by a delegation that was elected on the Sejm's last session on 1 March and departed to finish the negotiations in the Polish capital of Warsaw.

== Aftermath ==
The Polish Sejm passed the law proposed by the Central Lithuanian parliament on 22 March 1922 and two days later the Republic of Central Lithuania ceased to exist. 20 deputies from the Sejm of Central Lithuania were incorporated into the Polish Sejm. All of the Republic of Central Lithuania's territory was incorporated into the newly formed Wilno Voivodeship. The border changes were accepted by the Conference of Ambassadors of the Entente and the League of Nations. Lithuania declined to accept the Polish authority over the area and continued to treat the region as part of its own territory and Vilnius as its legitimate capital, with Kaunas designated only as a temporary seat of government. The Polish–Lithuanian diplomatic relations were not restored until the Polish ultimatum to Lithuania in 1938.

== See also ==
- Seimas of the Grand Duchy of Lithuania
- Constituent Assembly of Lithuania
