= Chana Katan =

American-born Israeli gynecologist

- חנה קטן
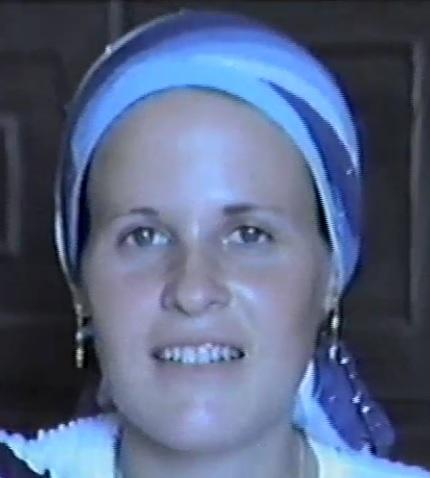
- Born: 9 September 1958 (age 67); Manhattan, New York
- Citizenship: United States of America, Israel
- Occupations: author, gynecologist
- Relatives: Max D. Raiskin (father); Barbara Elefant-Raiskin (mother)

Chana Katan (Hebrew: חנה קטן; born 9 September 1958) is an American-born Israeli gynecologist, teacher, author, and public figure.

== Biography ==
Katan established and directed the IVF unit at Laniado Hospital (Netanya, Israel). She founded the wellness center for women in Kiryat Sefer, and the sexology clinic at the Shaare Zedek Medical Center. Since 2012, she has written a regular column in the weekly magazine "B'Sheva" on the topics of Medical Ethics, Family and Judaism. She is married to Yoel Katan and they have 13 children.

== Selected works ==
- Chayei Isha – 2013
- Chayei Mishpacha – 2014
- Beyachad – 2016

== Awards ==
- "Woman of the Year" – Emunah – 2011
- "Katz Prize" – 2015
