= Barbara Elefant-Raiskin =

American writer

- ברברה אלפנט-רייסקין
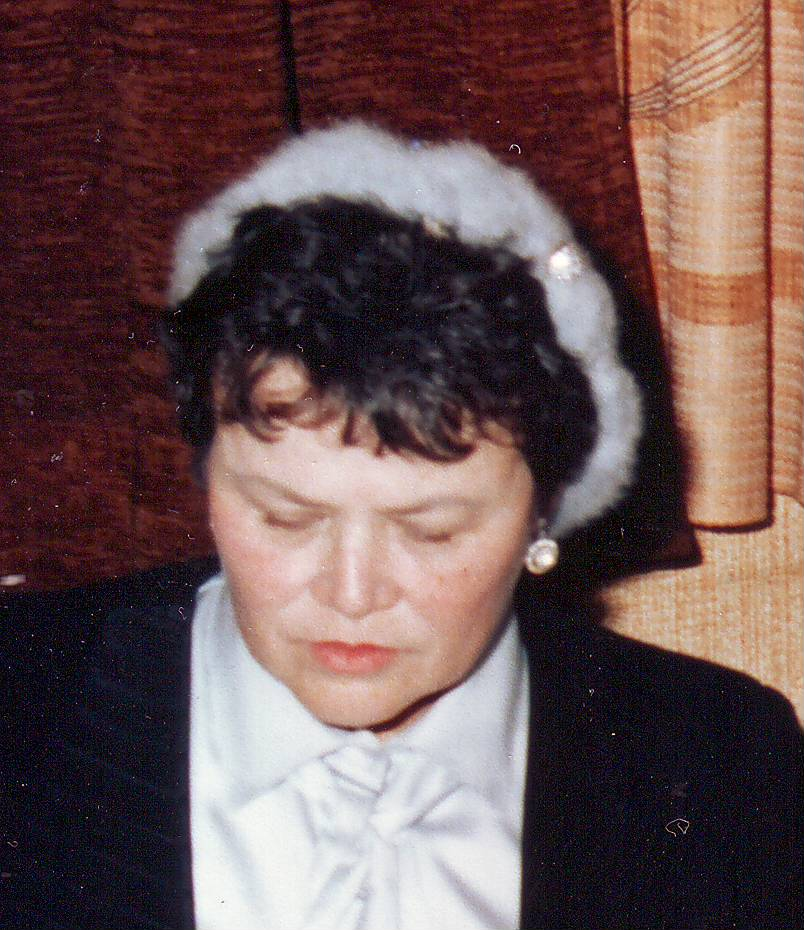
- Born: 11 October 1930; Mukachevo, Czechoslovakia
- Citizenship: Czechoslovakia, United States of America, Israel
- Occupations: University lecturer, author, artist
- Spouse: Max D. Raiskin
- Children: 8
- Writing career
- Genres: Poetry, children's books, educational textbooks

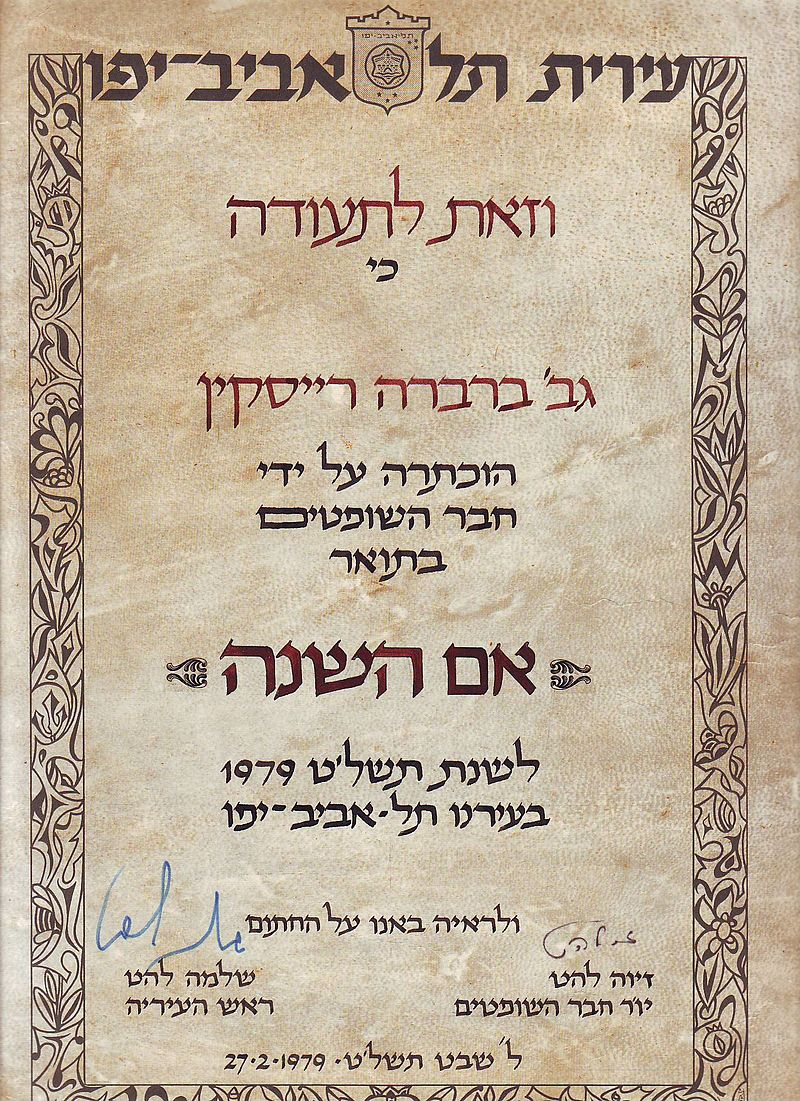
Mother of the Year Award, 1979

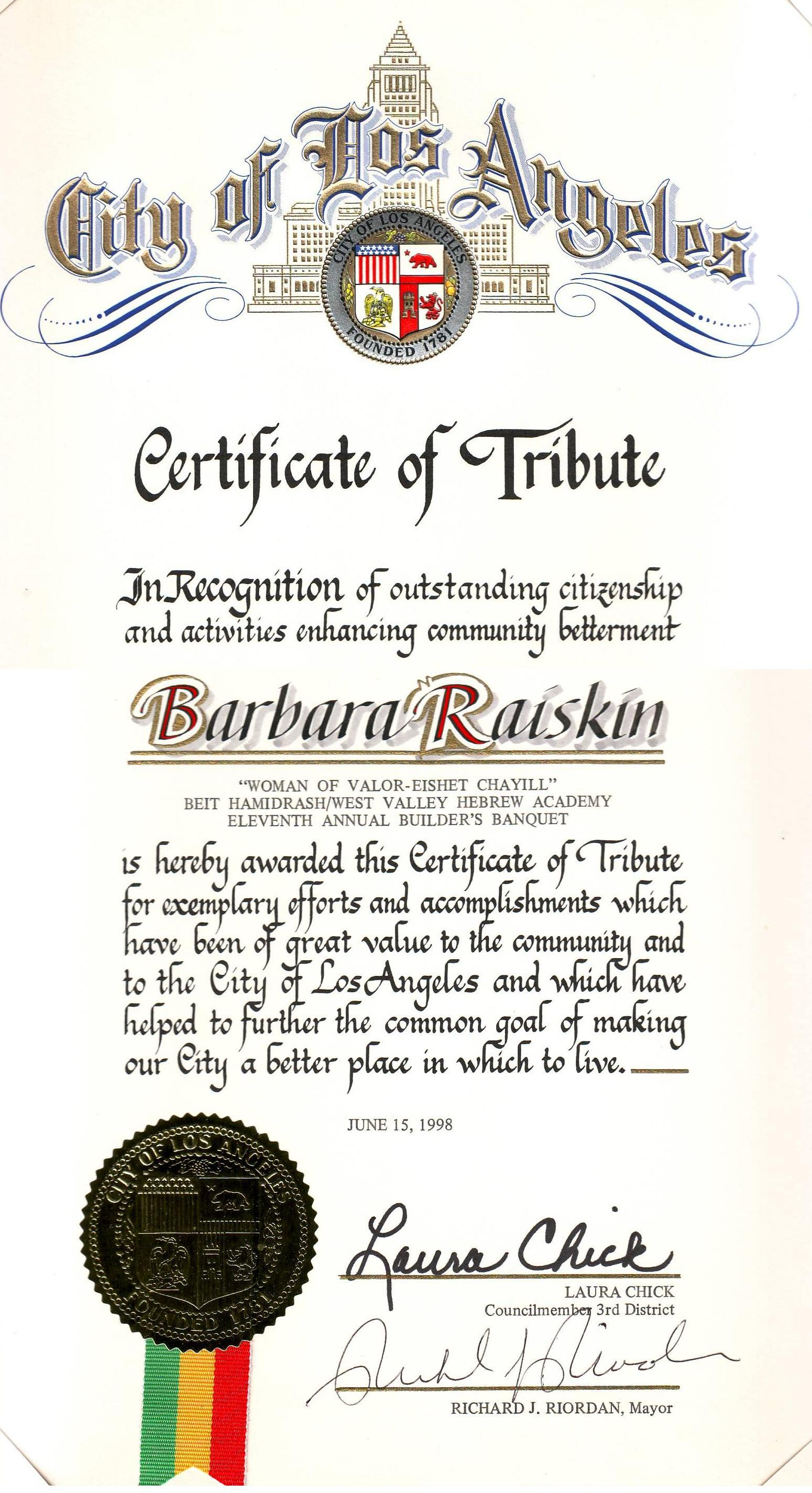
Eshet Chayil (Woman of Valor) Award, 1998

Barbara Elefant-Raiskin (Hebrew: ברברה אלפנט-רייסקין; October 11, 1930 – June 18, 2013) was a Jewish American-Israeli educator, university lecturer, poet, painter, author of children's literature and textbooks.

== Early life ==
Elefant-Raiskin was born in Mukachevo, then in Czechoslovakia, to Joseph-Meir and Sarah Elefant. Her father was an Orthodox Rabbi and teacher. In 1936 her family moved to Ada, Serbia. While staying there they became stateless, since the part of Czechoslovakia they had lived in had been taken over by Nazi allied Hungary. The family managed to emigrate to the U.S. in 1939, just before the outbreak of World War II. On the way to the U.S. they stayed in England for several months, and while in Liverpool, she had fallen asleep on a suitcase and was photographed by John Albok and the photo of a refugee child asleep on her luggage was printed in local newspapers as well as Jewish Newspapers in the U.S. After graduating from Brooklyn College and NYU she was a Kindergarten Teacher at several Jewish institutions, the last of which was the East Side Hebrew Institute. Her numerous academic degrees were in the fields of Education, Judaism, History, Art and Psychology. In 1957, she married Rabbi Max D. Raiskin, and then began teaching history in High Schools, while still maintaining the position of supervisor at the Kindergarten of the East Side Hebrew Institute. After taking several years off to raise her 8 children and complete her doctorate, Elefant-Raiskin emigrated to Israel in the 1970s, where she began teaching at Tel Aviv University, maintaining the position of lecturer for nearly 25 years. She authored two textbooks at the university.

== Selected works ==
- English Conversation Through Literature : intermediate level, Tel Aviv University*English Conversation Through Literature : Intermediate and Advanced Levels, Tel Aviv University (Textbook)
- Velvety Blackness (Selected poems & paintings)
- About the Wind (An illustrated Children's book, English)
- A Visit to The Pet Shop, (An illustrated Children's book, English)
- A Discussion About God (An illustrated Children's book, English)
- Jaffa's Little Red-Striped Lighthouse (An illustrated Children's book, English)
- Ma Osa HaRuach?, (An illustrated Children's book, Hebrew)
- Habikur Shel Gan Hayeladim Bachanut Lechayot Machmad, (An illustrated Children's book, Hebrew)
- Post Datal Depression LCCN 2005423665 (Illustrated by Elefant-Raiskin)
- Geva Eino Ro'e Kol Tzeva (Illustrated by Elefant-Raiskin)
- Sahar Hu Bachur Saharuri (Illustrated by Elefant-Raiskin)

== Awards ==
- Mother of the Year 1979 – A Tel Aviv Municipal Award.
- Woman of Valor Award 1998.
