= Popular Councils (political party) =

Popular Councils Rady Ludowe
- Leader: Józef Małowieski
- Dissolved: 1922
- Headquarters: Vilnius
- Ideology: Radicalism
- Political position: Centre-left

The Popular Councils (Note: Polish: Rady Ludowe) was a centre-left political party in the Republic of Central Lithuania. Following the 1922 general elections, it held 34 seats in the Sejm of Central Lithuania, being the second most popular party. After the Peasant Group of Popular Councils broke away from the party, its number of seats dropped to 27. Its ideology was moderate radicalism, and it supported the incorporation of Central Lithuania into Poland. Its leader was Józef Małowieski.
