= Peasant Group of Popular Councils =

Political party in Lithuania

Peasant Group of Popular Councils Grupa Włościańska Rad Ludowych
- Leader: Adam Uziembło
- Founded: 1922
- Dissolved: 1922
- Headquarters: Vilnius
- Ideology: Agrarianism; Agrarian socialism
- Political position: Left-wing

The Peasant Group of Popular Councils (Note: Polish: Grupa Włościańska Rad Ludowych) was a left-wing political party in the Republic of Central Lithuania. It was formed in 1922, by breaking off from the Popular Councils during the government cadency, and held seven seats in the Sejm of Central Lithuania. It supported the agrarianism and agrarian socialism. Its leader was Adam Uziembło.
