= Channa (disambiguation) =

Channa may refer to:

- Ahsaas Channa, an Indian actress
- Ameet Channa, a British-Indian actor
- Channa (Buddhist), a royal servant of Prince Siddhartha (Gautama Buddha) who later became an arahant
- Channa (tribe), a Sindhi tribe in Pakistan
- Channa masala, a South Asian dish consisting of chickpeas
- Channa, a genus of the snakehead fishes
- Humaira Channa, Pakistani singer
- Alam Channa, Pakistani farmer, one of the world's tallest people
- Channa, the formal Chinese name for the Chan or Zen school of Buddhism

== See also ==
- Chana (disambiguation)
- Channa Mereya (disambiguation)
