= Chanos =

Chanos may refer to:

- Chanos (fish), a genus of milkfish
- Chanos-Curson, a commune of the Drôme, a department in southeastern France
- Chanos, Zamora, a municipality in Spain
- George Chanos (born 1958), American attorney and politician
- James Chanos (born 1957), American investor

== See also ==
- Chano (disambiguation)
