= Popular Association "Odrodzenie-Wyzwolenie" =

Centre-left political party in Central Lithuania (1920s)

Popular Association "Odrodzenie-Wyzwolenie" Związek Ludowy „Odrodzenie-Wyzwolenie”
- Leader: Ludwik Chomiński
- Dissolved: 1922
- Headquarters: Vilnius
- Ideology: Agrarianism; Agrarian socialism
- Political position: Centre-left

The Popular Association "Odrodzenie-Wyzwolenie" (Note: Polish: Związek Ludowy „Odrodzenie-Wyzwolenie”) was a centre-left political party in the Republic of Central Lithuania. Following the 1922 general elections, it held 5 seats in the Sejm of Central Lithuania. Its political programme was identical to the one of Polish People's Party "Wyzwolenie" which operated in Poland, and was based on agrarianism and agrarian socialism. It supported the autonomy of Central Lithuania from Poland; however, it did not oppose the possible future federation with it, as proposed by Józef Piłsudski. Its leader was Ludwik Chomiński.
