= Chano =

Chano may refer to:

== People ==
- Chano (footballer, born 1961), Spanish footballer
- Chano (footballer, born 1965), Spanish footballer
- Sebastián Rodríguez Veloso (nickname Chano, born 1957), Spanish Paralympic swimmer
- Chance the Rapper (nickname Chano, born 1993), American hip hop recording artist

=== Given name ===
- Chano Domínguez (born 1960), Spanish jazz pianist
- Chano Lobato (1927-2009), Spanish flamenco singer
- Chano Pozo (1915-1948), Cuban jazz composer and percussionist
- Chano Urueta (1904-1979), Mexican film director

=== Surname ===
- Takayuki Chano (born 1976), Japanese retired footballer

== Places ==
- Chano (Peranzanes), a village in the municipality of Peranzanes, Spain

== See also ==
- Chanos (disambiguation)
- Chana (disambiguation)
