= Popular Association "Odrodzenie" =

Centre-left political party in Central Lithuania (1920s)

Popular Association "Odrodzenie" Związek Ludowy „Odrodzenie”
- Leader: Stefan Mickiewicz
- Dissolved: 1922
- Headquarters: Vilnius
- Ideology: Agrarianism; Agrarian socialism
- Political position: Centre-left

The Popular Association "Odrodzenie" (Note: Polish: Związek Ludowy „Odrodzenie”) was a centre-left political party in the Republic of Central Lithuania. Following the 1922 general elections, it held 3 seats in the Sejm of Central Lithuania. Its political programme was based on agrarianism and agrarian socialism, and was similar to the one of Polish People's Party "Wyzwolenie" that operated in Poland. It supported the federation of Central Lithuania with Lithuania. Its leader was Stefan Mickiewicz.
