= Chanas =

Chanas may refer to:

- the Nadar caste, one of the South Indian, Tamil castes
- Chanas, Isère, a commune of the Isère département, in France
- Chanas, Iran, a village in Markazi Province, Iran

== See also ==
- Chana (disambiguation)
