= Channa Mereya (disambiguation) =

"Channa Mereya" (lit. 'O Moon of Mine') is a song by Pritam and Arijit Singh from the 2016 Indian film Ae Dil Hai Mushkil.

It may also refer to:

- Channa Mereya (film), a 2017 Indian romance film
- Channa Mereya (TV series), a 2022 Indian television series

== See also ==
- Channa (disambiguation)
