= Association of National Parties and Organisations =

Association of National Parties and Organisations Zespół Stronnictw i Ugrupowań Narodowych
- Leader: Witold Bańkowski
- Dissolved: 1922
- Headquarters: Vilnius
- Political position: Centre-right politics; Centrism; Christian democracy; National conservatism; Polish nationalism
- Sejm of Central Lithuania (1922): 43 / 106

The Association of National Parties and Organisations (Polish: Zespół Stronnictw i Ugrupowań Narodowych, ZUiSN) was a right-wing and centre-right electoral alliance of the political parties in the Republic of Central Lithuania, a short-lived break away state in Eastern and Nothern Europe, and a puppet state of Poland. Following the 1922 general elections, it held 43 out of 106 seats in the Sejm of Central Lithuania. The Association of National Parties and Organisations consisted of the Popular National Union, National People's Union, Christian National Labour Party, and Polish Nonpartisan Organisation. It supported the full incorporation of the state into Poland, and the transfer of the executive powers of the parliament to the Legislative Sejm of Poland. Witold Bańkowski served as its leader.

== History ==
The Association of National Parties and Organisations was a right-wing electoral alliance of the political parties with Polish national-conservative, Christian-democratic, and centrist views. It operated in the Republic of Central Lithuania, a short-lived break away state in Eastern Europe, and a puppet state of Poland, which existed from 1920 to 1922. The alliance consisted of the Popular National Union, National People's Union, Christian National Labour Party, and Polish Nonpartisan Organisation. It was founded in the preparations for the 1922 general elections, following which, it held 43 of the 106 seats in the Sejm of Central Lithuania, the most of all the parties. The party members supported the full incorporation of the Republic of Central Lithuania into Poland, and the transfer of the executive powers of the parliament to the Legislative Sejm of Poland, leaving the former as an adjudicator body under the name of the Adjudicating Sejm (Polish: Sejm Orzekający). Witold Bańkowski served as the leader of the Association of National Parties and Organisations, and it had its headquarters in the city of Vilnius. The Republic of Central Lithuania was incorporated into Poland on 18 April 1922, with its parliamant being dissolved on the same day, with the electoral alliance also being disbanded.
