= Polish People's Party of Wilno Land =

Left-wing political party in Central Lithuania (1920s)

Polish People's Party of Wilno Land Polskie Stronnictwo Ludowe Ziemi Wileńskiej
- Leader: Bronisław Krzyżanowski
- Dissolved: 1922
- Headquarters: Vilnius
- Ideology: Agrarianism; Agrarian socialism
- Political position: Left-wing

The Polish People's Party of Wilno Land (Note: Polish: Polskie Stronnictwo Ludowe Ziemi Wileńskiej, abbriv.: PSL Ziemi Wileńskiej) was a left-wing political party in the Republic of Central Lithuania. Following the 1922 general elections, it held 13 seats in the Sejm of Central Lithuania. Its ideology consisted of agrarianism and agrarian socialism, and it supported the autonomy of Central Lithuania within a federation with Poland. Its leader was Bronisław Krzyżanowski.
