= Polish Socialist Party of Lithuania and Belarus =

Socialist party in Lithuania and Belarus (1910s–1922)

Polish Socialist Party of Lithuania and Belarus Polska Partia Socjalistyczna Litwy i Białorusi
- Leader: Aleksander Zasztowt
- Headquarters: Vilnius
- Ideology: Left-wing nationalism Revolutionary socialism
- Political position: Left-wing

Polish Socialist Party of Lithuania and Belarus (Note: Polish: Polska Partia Socjalistyczna Litwy i Białorusi, abbriv.: PPSLiB) was a left-wing political party, that was an autonomous branch of Polish Socialist Party, and which operated in Lithuania and Belarus in the late 1910s and early 1920s. Its political programme was identical with the one of Polish Socialist Party, and was based around left-wing nationalism and revolutionary socialism.

== History ==
In the late 1910s, it operated in the area of Lithuania and Belarus, as an autonomous branch of Polish Socialist Party, which operated in Poland. Its political programme was identical with the one of Polish Socialist Party, and was based around left-wing nationalism and revolutionary socialism. In 1918, Aleksander Zasztowt became its leader and remained as such until 1923. Since 1920, it was active in the Republic of Central Lithuania, and following the 1922 general elections, it held 3 seats in the Sejm of Central Lithuania. It was present in the Sejm until March 1922, when it was disbanded, and Central Lithuania incorporated into Poland shortly after that.
