= John Albok =

John Albok (1894–1982) was a Hungarian photographer who immigrated to the United States and documented street scenes in New York City during the Great Depression and later.

== Youth ==
John Albok was born in Munkacs, Hungary, in what is now Ukraine. After apprenticing to a tailor from the ages of 13 to 17, he was drafted into the Hungarian army. He began photographing life in the hospital and prison where he worked. During the war, Albok's father killed himself and two of his sisters died of starvation. In 1921, Albok immigrated to the United States.

== New York City ==
John Albok worked as a tailor in a shop at 96th Street and Madison Avenue. He lived above the shop with his wife, fellow Hungarian Ilona Kiss, and their daughter, also named Ilona. He photographed street life primarily in his immediate neighborhood for sixty years, until his death in 1982.

== Photography ==
After winning a weekly photo contest held by the New York Herald Tribune in 1937, he captured the attention of Grace Mayer, photography curator at the Museum of the City of New York. His first solo show, Faces of the City, was held at the Museum in 1938.

Today, Albok's work may be found in collections at the Museum of the City of New York, the Metropolitan Museum of Art, the Getty Museum, and many other institutions. John Albok's estate is represented by Photographs Do Not Bend (PDNB) Gallery in Dallas, Texas.

== Sources and further reading ==
=== Books of Photographs by John Albok ===
- John Albok, 1894-1982 : through the eye of the needle = Albók János : keresztül a tű fokán. Budapest: Budapest Galéria; Hungarian Multicultural Center, Inc., 1998.
- John Albok, for the children : September 15 to October 14, 1995. Dallas: Photographic Archives Gallery, 1995.
