= Max D. Raiskin =

Rabbi Prof. Max D. Raiskin מרדכי רייסקין
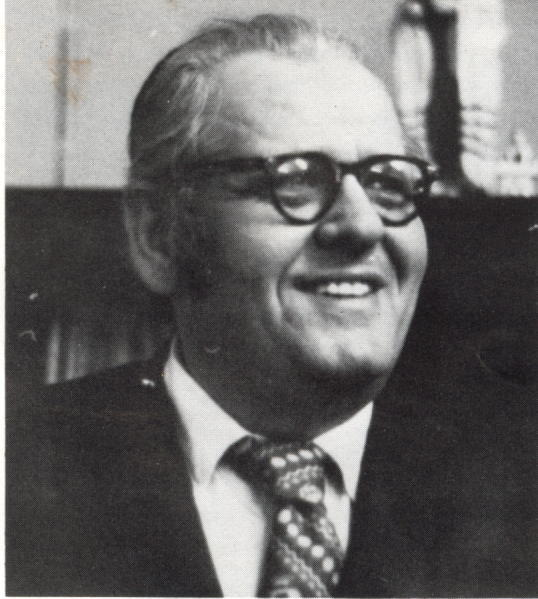

Personal life
- Born: Mordecai Eliyahu Tzvi Raiskin; June 3, 1919 New York City
- Died: December 29, 1978 (aged 59) Tel Aviv, Israel
- Buried: Kiryat Shaul cemetery, Tel Aviv, Israel
- Spouse: Barbara Elefant-Raiskin
- Children: 8
- Parent(s): Leib and Henia Raiskin

Religious life
- Religion: Judaism
- Denomination: Orthodox
- Position: Founder of Day School, Principal and Executive Director, Author of children's books and textbooks.
- Organisation: East Side Hebrew Institute

Max D. Raiskin (Hebrew: מרדכי רייסקין; June 3, 1919, New York City – December 29, 1978, Tel Aviv, Israel), was a rabbi, Professor of Hebrew Literature, licensed Certified Public Accountant, author of educational textbooks, and the principal and executive director of the East Side Hebrew Institute.

== Life and work ==
Max Raiskin was born in New York City on June 3, 1919 to Louis (Leib) and Anna (Henia) Raiskin, immigrants from Russia. The Middle initial of his name (the letter D) stands for his mother's maiden name, Dubnoff. In December 1947, the principal of the East Side Hebrew Institute, David R. Zaslowsky, died, and Raiskin was asked by the board to take over the school. Rabbi Raiskin served as the principal and executive director of the East Side Hebrew Institute for over 25 years, and was a professor of Hebrew literature at Brooklyn College and Hunter College. Aside from that he was a well-known educator in NYC. His stated goal was to bring Jews closer to Judaism, with the motto that "Every Jewish child deserves a Jewish education". He was the first in the U.S. to initiate and establish a program for preparing mentally challenged and blind children for their bar mitzvahs. He also established the program for the master's degree in Modern Hebrew Literature at Brooklyn College in the early 1950s. Rabbi Raiskin authored several educational books, edited a multitude of others (uncredited), and was Ktav Publishing's educational advisor. In 1974 Rabbi Raiskin emigrated to Israel with his wife and eight children, where he died in 1978.

In 1981, the 6th street Synagogue and community center in New York City, where many of his students were members, was named in his honor "The Rabbi Max D. Raiskin Center". In 1997, one of his former students, actor Paul Reiser, named a Day School after him in Los Angeles, following his educational philosophy.

== Bibliography ==
=== Books ===
- Sefer Ha'avot I : Haver LaHistoria (1954)
- Torati (1956)
- Chumashi I: Genesis (1956)
- Chumashi I (Color Edition) (1956-1957)
- Chumashi II: With Rashi Readings (1959)
- Sefer Ha'avot I Targilon (Workbook) (1960)
- Sefer Ha'avot II : Toledot Hashvatim (1965)
- Sefer Ha'avot II Workbook (1967)
- Mitzvot and Values (1977)
- Mishnah Tractate Ta'anit with the commentary of Rabbi Ovadya of Bartinura : translated into English, punctuated and annotated (1996)
