= East Side Hebrew Institute =

Location
- East Village, Manhattan; United States; 40°46′2.32″N 73°57′47.56″W

Information
- Type: Jewish day school
- Religious affiliation: Jewish
- Established: 1910
- Founder: A group of immigrants
- Closed: 1980s

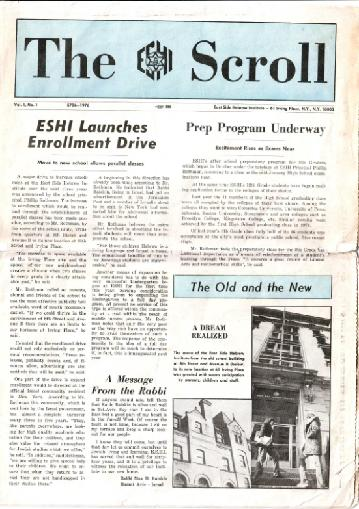
The ESHI Scroll (1976), school newspaper

The East Side Hebrew Institute was a traditional Jewish day school, in the East Village/Alphabet City area of Manhattan, New York City. It was "once one of the major institutions of the Jewish East Side".

== History ==
The East Side Hebrew Institute (or as it was called: ESHI) was founded in 1910 by a group of immigrants from the town of Zhitomir in Russia (present day Ukraine). David R. Zaslowsky was its first principal and founder. The school spent the bulk of its years, 1928–1974, in a large red brick building at the corner of 8th Street and Avenue B (295 East 8th Street).

At first, ESHI was a Talmud Torah. Children attended the school at the close of public school and on Sunday mornings. They received two hours of instruction each session. On Saturday the children conducted their own service in the building’s synagogue.

In 1948, after Rabbi Max D. Raiskin’s appointment as Principal, a nursery-kindergarten was opened to serve the Peter Cooper Village—Stuyvesant Town area. Soon after that, a Day School was established which grew grade by grade through High School. In 1975 the first High School Graduation was held at the Waldorf-Astoria Hotel.

One of the major reasons for establishing the Day School was the need for a quality Jewish day school in lower Manhattan serving the general Jewish public, not only the religious population.

Alphabet City had been in rapid transition. The Jewish population moved out of the crowded tenements for new middle-class neighborhoods. The numbers that remained behind dwindled rapidly, and the student body of the Talmud Torah diminished. The Day School, however, was meeting a radically different need; it grew and grew. Parents would not send their children into the increasingly dangerous East Side for an hour and a half of Jewish after-school instruction, which could have frequently been conducted closer to the student’s home. But a quality Day School education, valuing Judaism and academic excellence, and offered at a rate lower-middle income people could afford, was something worth traveling to obtain. There was, however, a limit to parental interest in searching out the special values offered by the ESHI Day School. If the area around the school became so blighted that parents feared to send their children, the school would cease to be effective. It became increasingly clear that a move would be necessary. For years, taking note of the increasing pressures, the school’s leadership and friends searched for an alternative that would keep the tuition levels of the school within reason. The location had to be physically close to the existing parent body in order to allow for continuity. In July, 1975, the move was made to 61 Irving Place, in Manhattan.

In the early 1980s, the East Side Hebrew Institute merged with the Park East Synagogue, the latter having only a pre-school until the merger. The new merged school was named "Park East ESHI". Several years later, the name “ESHI” was removed by the new school board, which gave it the old-new name, “Park East” (the Park East Day School). The old school had still been alive through the veins of these remaining students, but under a new name; and in a way, ESHI continues to exist through the Park East Day School and its students today as well.

== Notable alumni ==
- Shelley Ackerman
- Maurice Berger
- Kevin S. Bright
- Julius Rosenberg
- Paul Reiser
- Sharon Lebewohl
- Ron Silver

There is a lively ESHI Alumni Group on Facebook with nearly 200 ESHI alumni posting stories, photographs and opportunities to reconnect.

== Extracurricular activities ==
There were class newspapers, while the upper classes were also instructed to read and use The New York Times as a basis. Science fairs were held several times a year. Every class had to present some science experiment and the best one would be chosen as the winner. On Lag Ba'omer, the school used to go to Randalls Island for a picnic, or to the Palisades Park. The school also held the first program in the U.S. for preparing mentally challenged and blind children for their Bar Mitzvah, initiated and directed by Rabbi Raiskin. ESHI also had its own youth movement named “Shimshon" and "Shimshona”, for the boys and girls, respectively, which was founded by Mordecai Wucher of Bridgeport Connecticut.
