= Chana Kowalska =

Jewish Polish painter

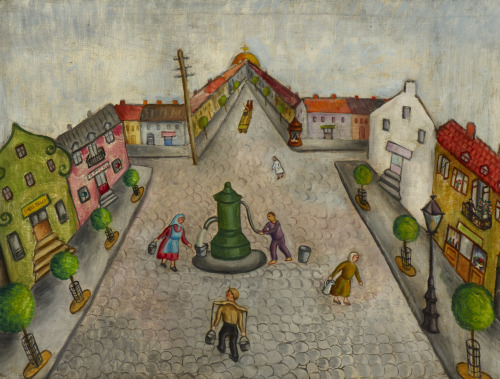
Chana Kowalska's "Shtetl" (The Village, 1934)

Chana (Anna) Kowalska Winogora (1899–c.1942) was a Polish Jewish painter and journalist whose artworks reflect her rural origins. While in Paris during the German occupation, she was active in Jewish Communist organizations and wrote about art in local journals. Active in the French Resistance, she was arrested by the Gestapo and deported to Auschwitz in July 1942.

== Biography ==
Born in Włocławek on 4 November 1899, Chana Kowalska was the daughter of Jehuda Lejb Kowalski (1862–1925), a Zionist rabbi and politician. After turning to drawing when she was 16, from 1922 she studied painting in Berlin. It was there she met her future husband, the writer Baruch Winogóra.

The couple moved to Paris where they lived at 171 Avenue de Clichy. Unable to afford her own studio, Kowalski painted in those of her friends. She became active in Jewish communist organizations, participating in the Jewish cultural event at the 1937 Paris World Exhibition. She also contributed articles on art to Yiddish journals. Her artwork is appreciated as representative of a female artist living in Paris as a Jewish communist during the German occupation. Of particular interest is her painting Shtetl depicting one of the many small Jewish towns in eastern Europe which were destroyed by the Nazis in the 1940s.

After being arrested by the Gestapo for her involvement in communist activities, Kowalska was first interned at the Caserne des Tourelles internment camp. She was deported on 19 July 1942 to Auschwitz-Birkenau where she was murdered by the Nazis.
