= Lithuania–Poland relations =

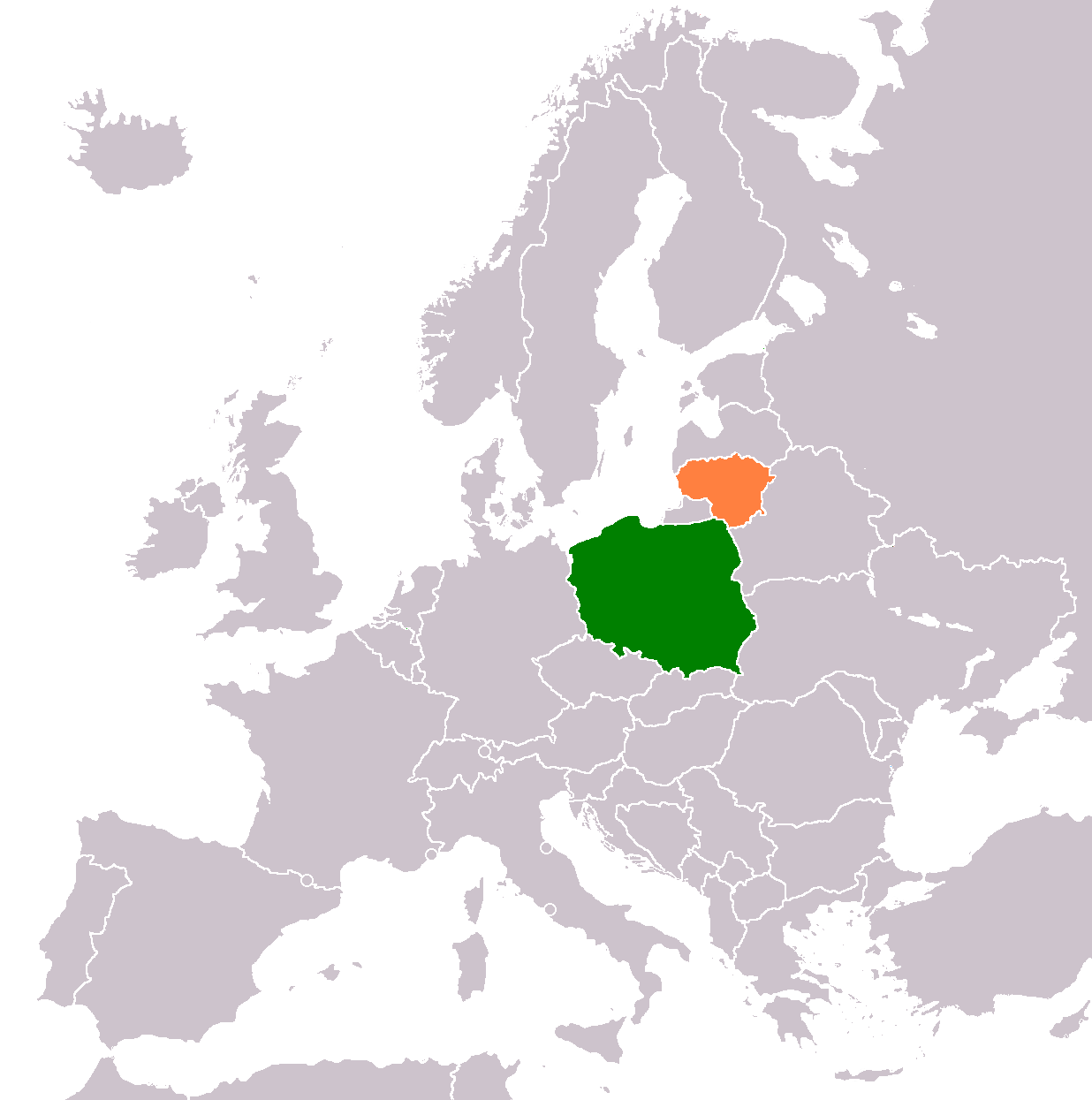

- Poland: Lithuania

Poland and Lithuania established diplomatic relations from the 13th century, after the Grand Duchy of Lithuania under king Mindaugas acquired some of the territory of Rus' and thus established a border with the then-fragmented Kingdom of Poland. Polish–Lithuanian relations subsequently improved, ultimately leading to a personal union between the two states. From the mid-16th to the late 18th century Poland and Lithuania merged to form the Polish–Lithuanian Commonwealth, a state that was dissolved following their partition by Austria, Prussia and Russia. After the two states regained independence following the First World War, Polish–Lithuanian relations steadily worsened due to rising nationalist sentiments. Competing claims to the Vilnius region led to armed conflict and deteriorating relations in the interwar period. During the Second World War Polish and Lithuanian territories were occupied by both the Soviet Union and Nazi Germany, but relations between Poles and Lithuanians remained hostile. Following the end of World War II, both Poland and Lithuania found themselves in the Eastern Bloc, Poland as a Soviet satellite state, Lithuania as a Soviet republic. With the fall of communism relations between the two countries were reestablished. Since then relations have been friendly and akin to strategic partnership in defence and security.

The two countries became members of the European Union in 2004. Both countries are members of the Council of the Baltic Sea States, Council of Europe and NATO. Both countries share a common border of 103 km. Because both are part of the Schengen Area, there are no border controls between the countries.

== Borders ==
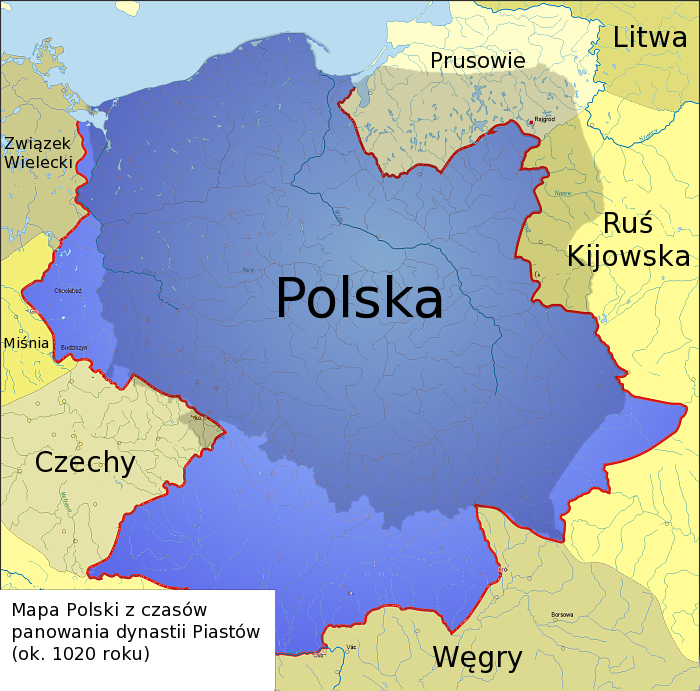
Map of Poland from the early 11th century shows Polish and Lithuanian lands separated by Old Prussian and Kyivan Rus’ territories

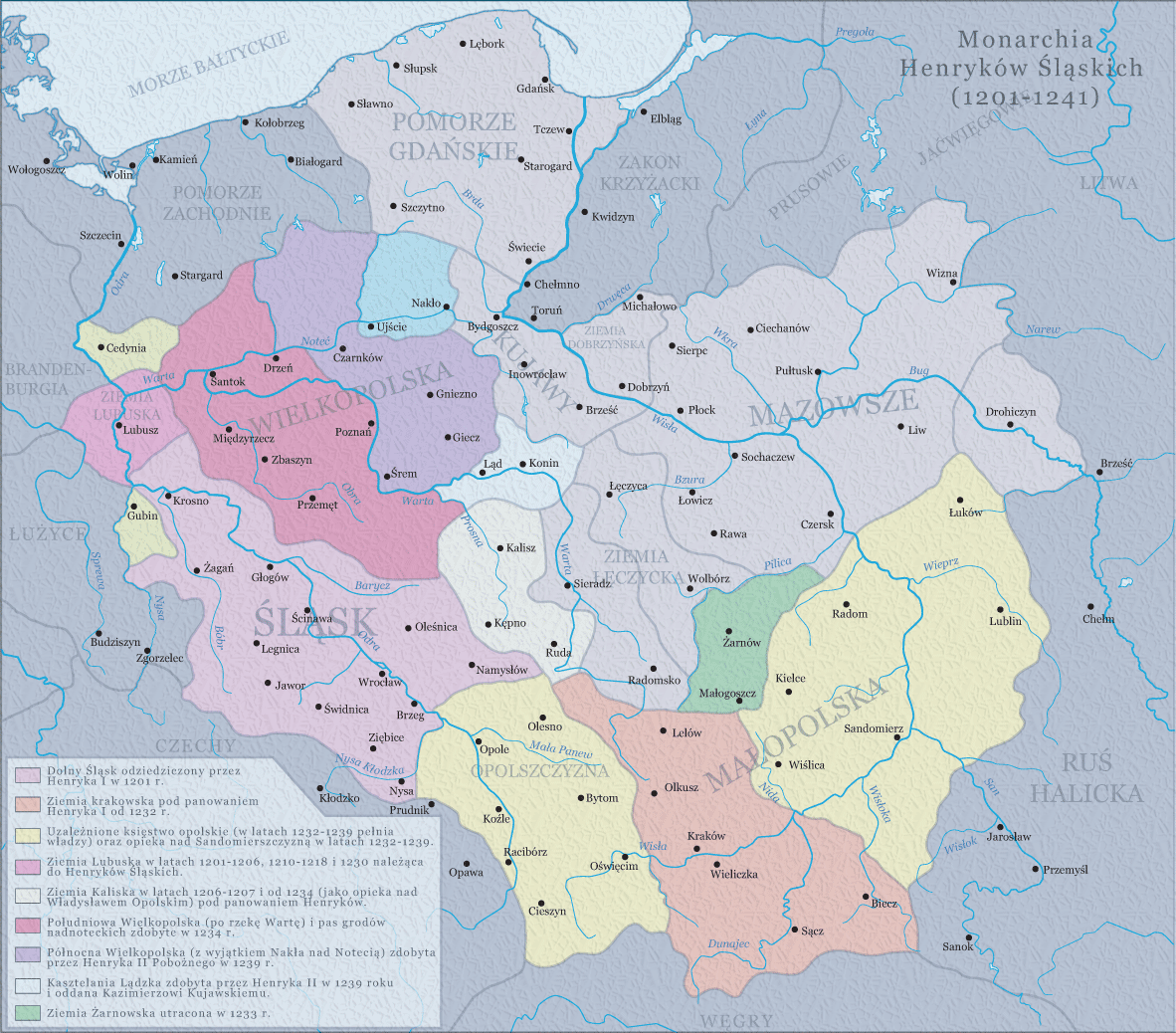
Map of Poland in the first half of the 13th century, shows a border between Duchy of Masovia and Lithuania

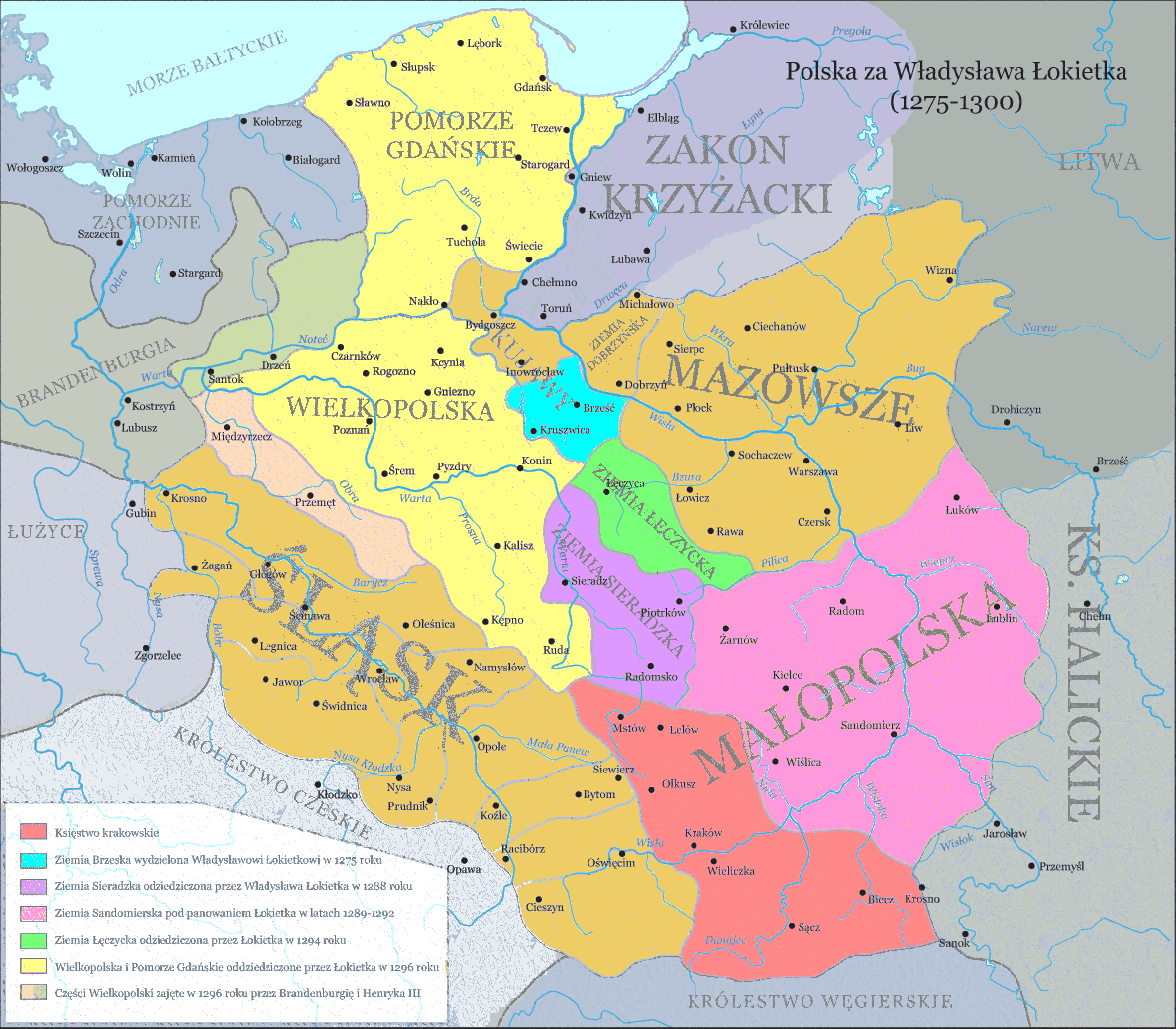
Map of Poland and Lithuania around 1275–1300, with visible Polish–Lithuanian border

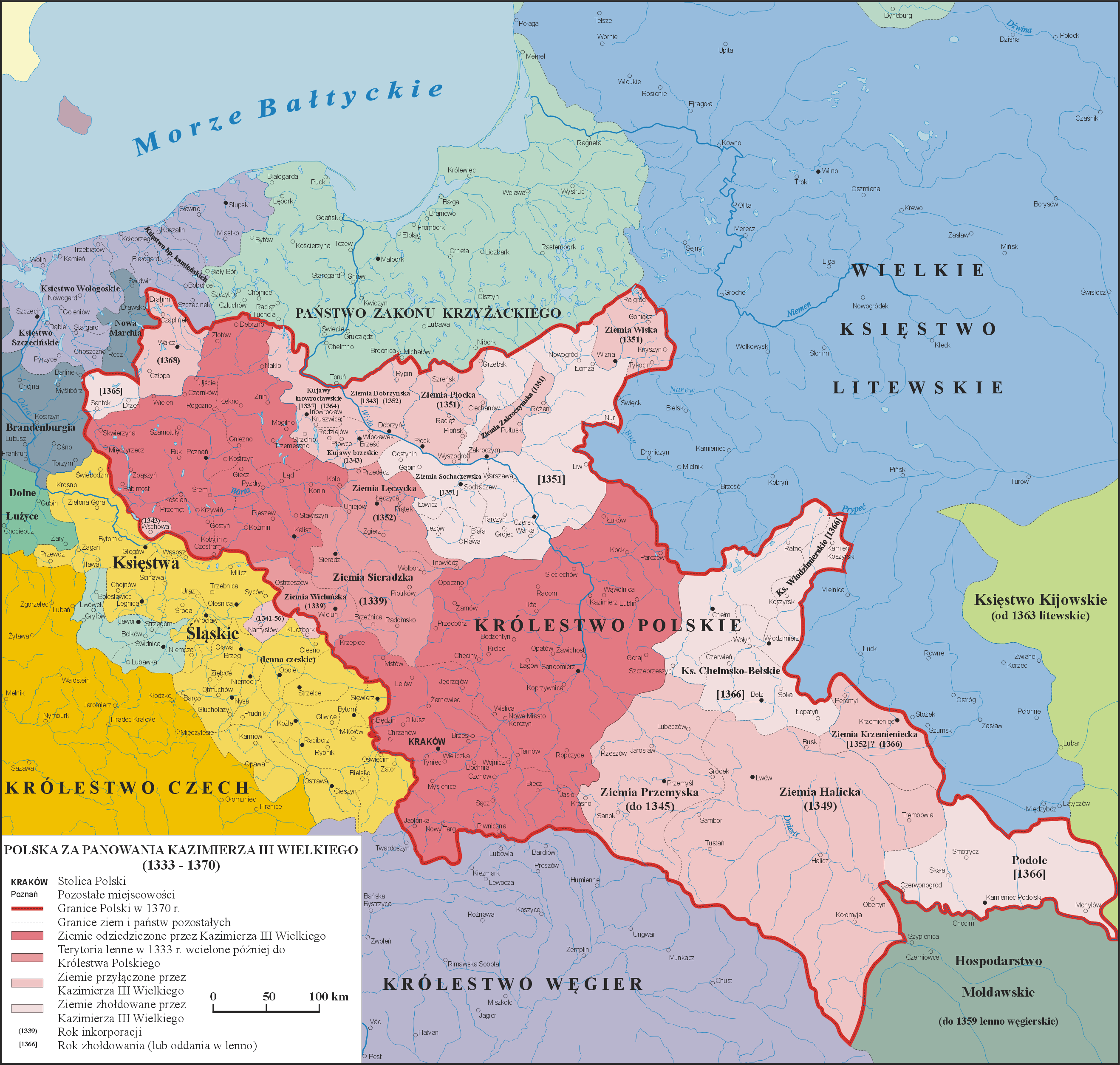
Map of Poland and Lithuania around 1333–1370, with visible Polish–Lithuanian border

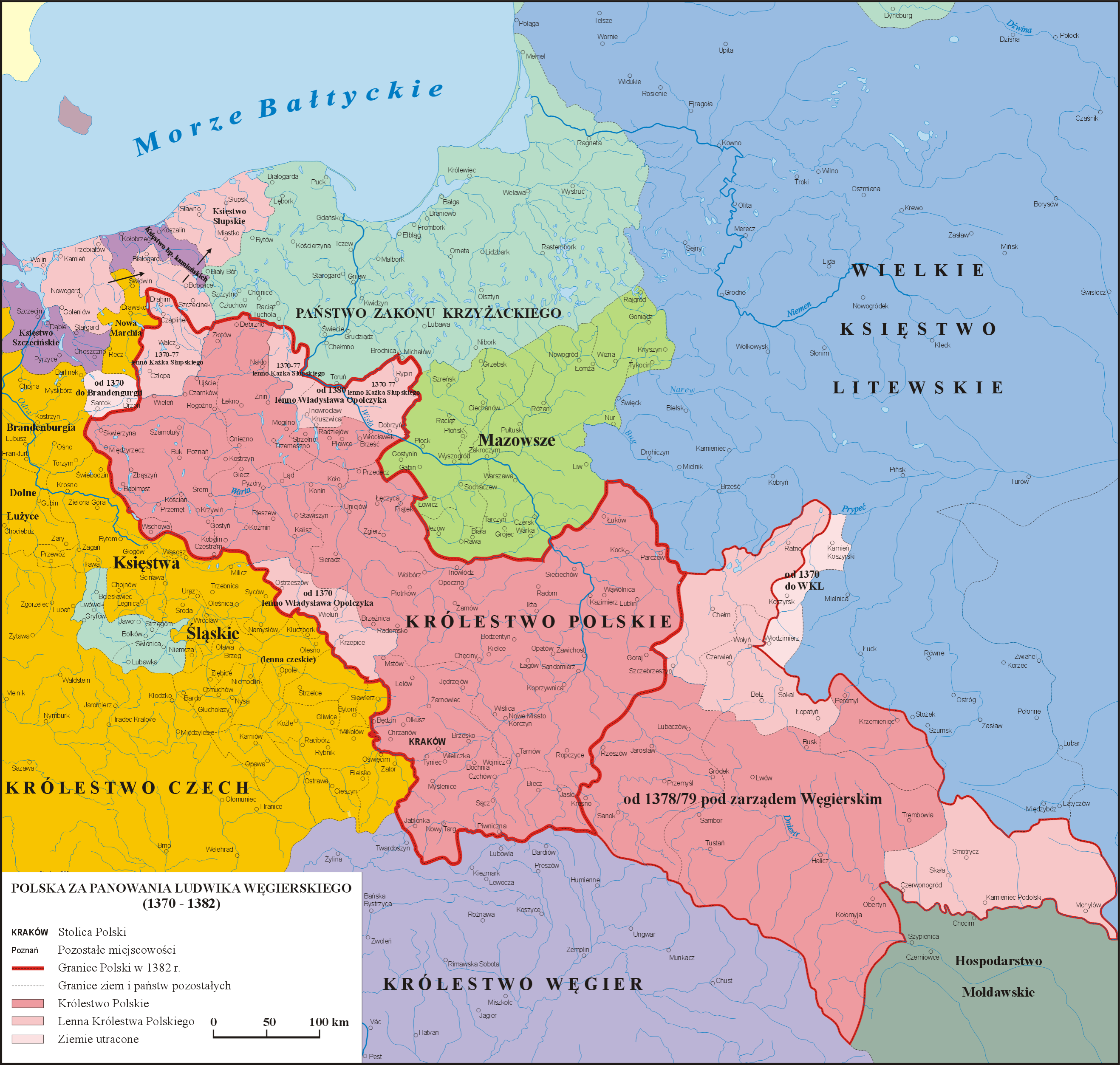
Map of Poland and Lithuania around 1370–1382, with visible Polish–Lithuanian border

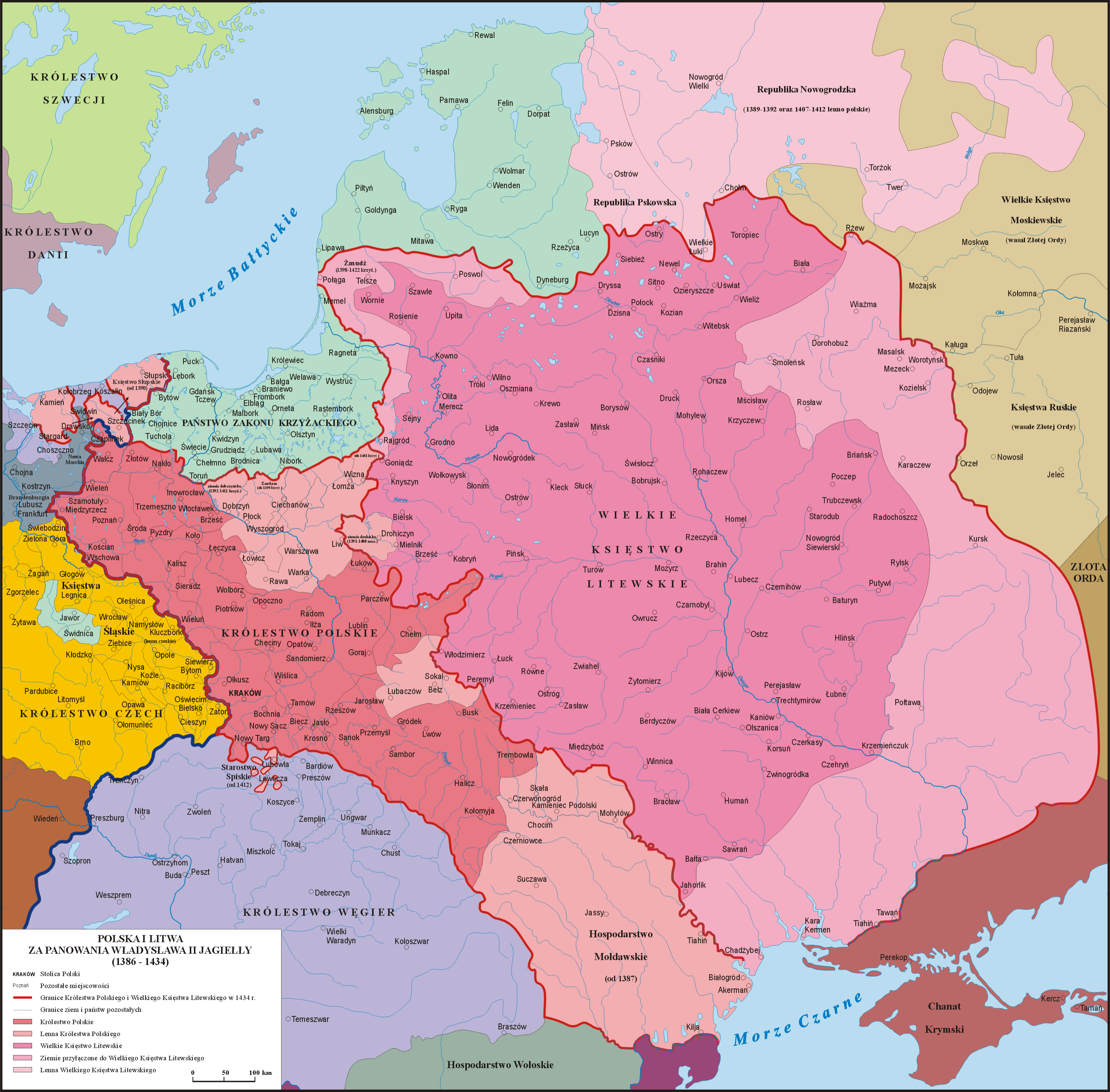
Map of Poland and Lithuania around 1386–1434, with visible Polish–Lithuanian border

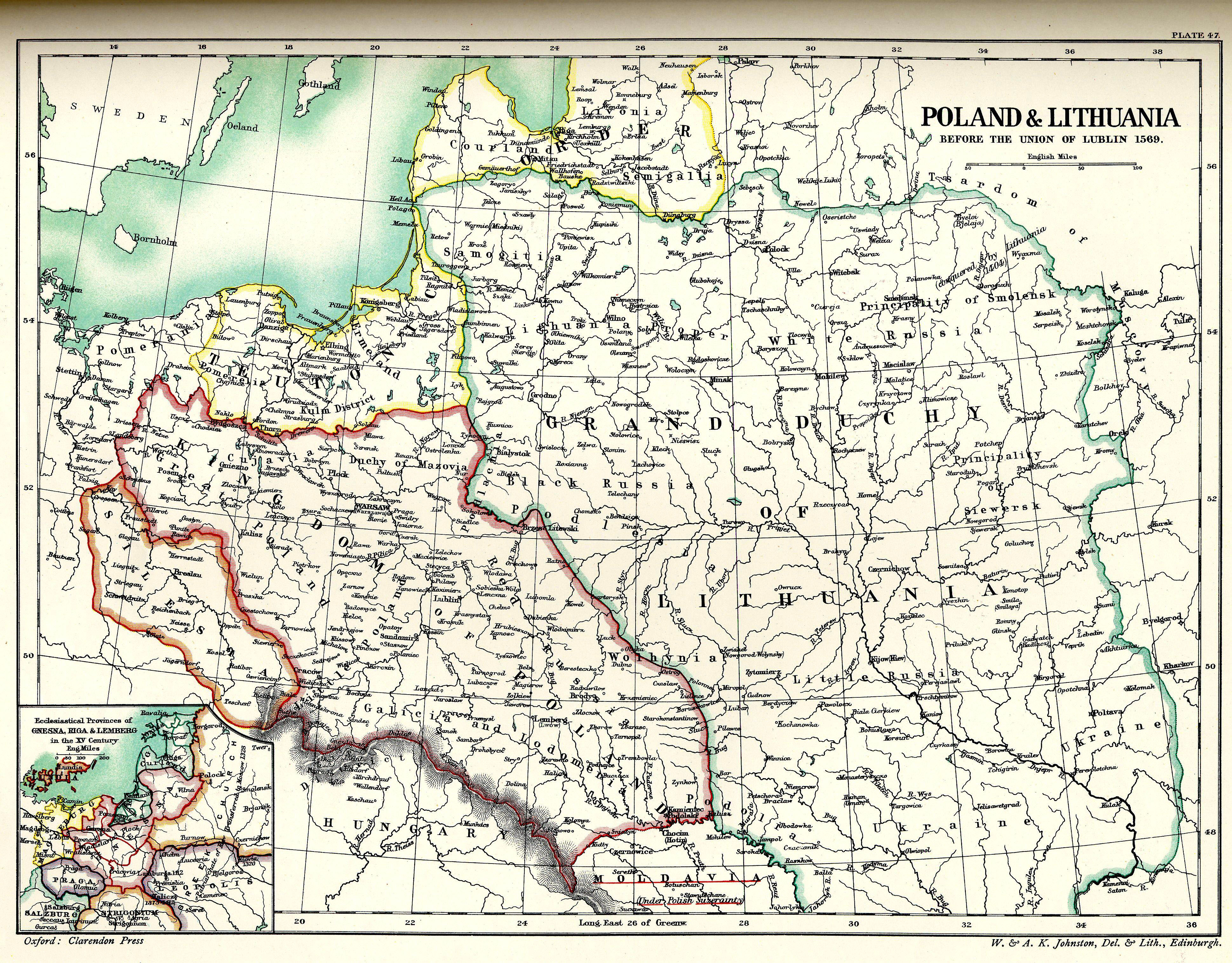
1888 English map of Poland and Lithuania before the Union of Lublin (1569)

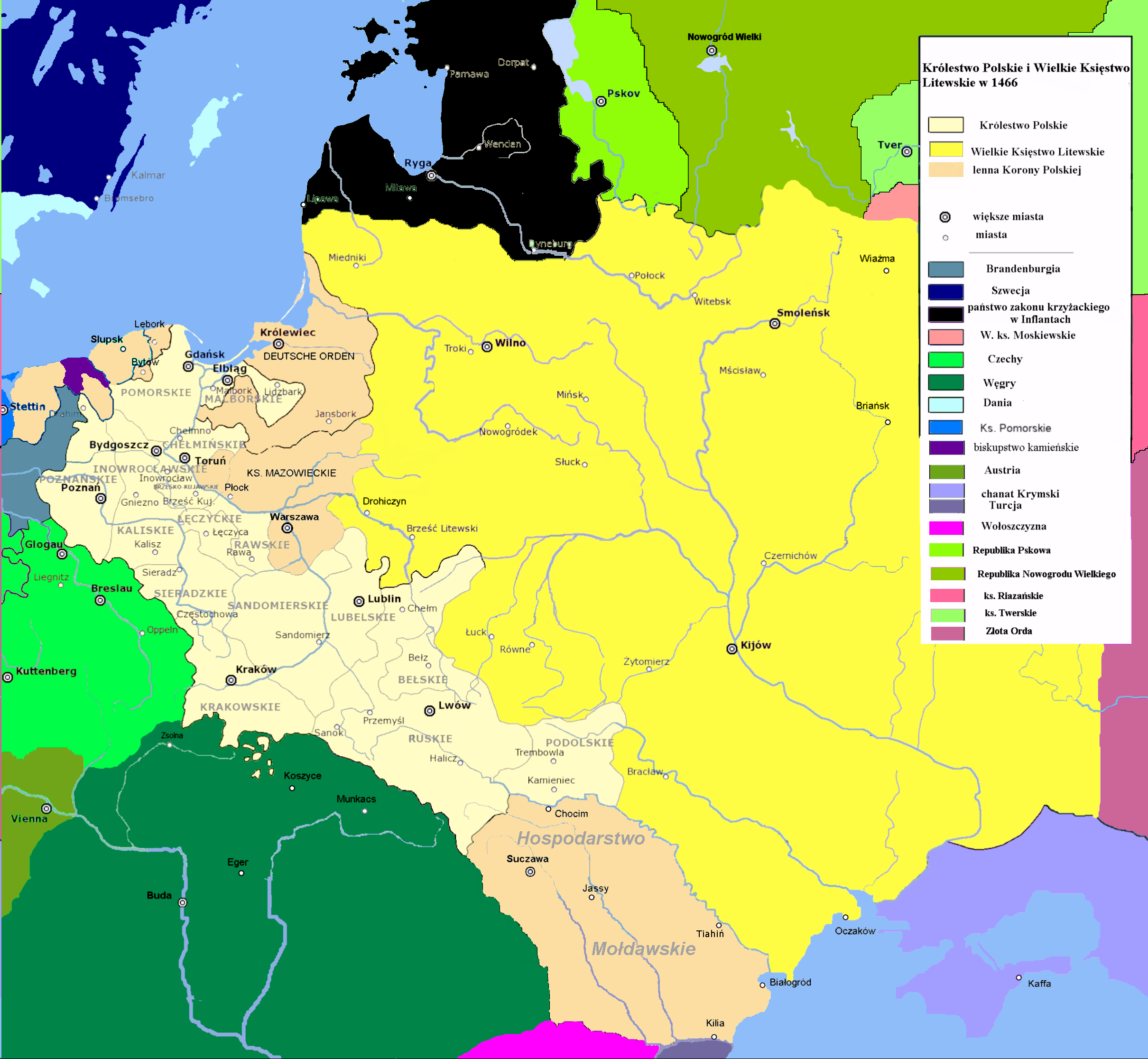
Map of Poland and Lithuania around 1466, with visible Polish–Lithuanian border

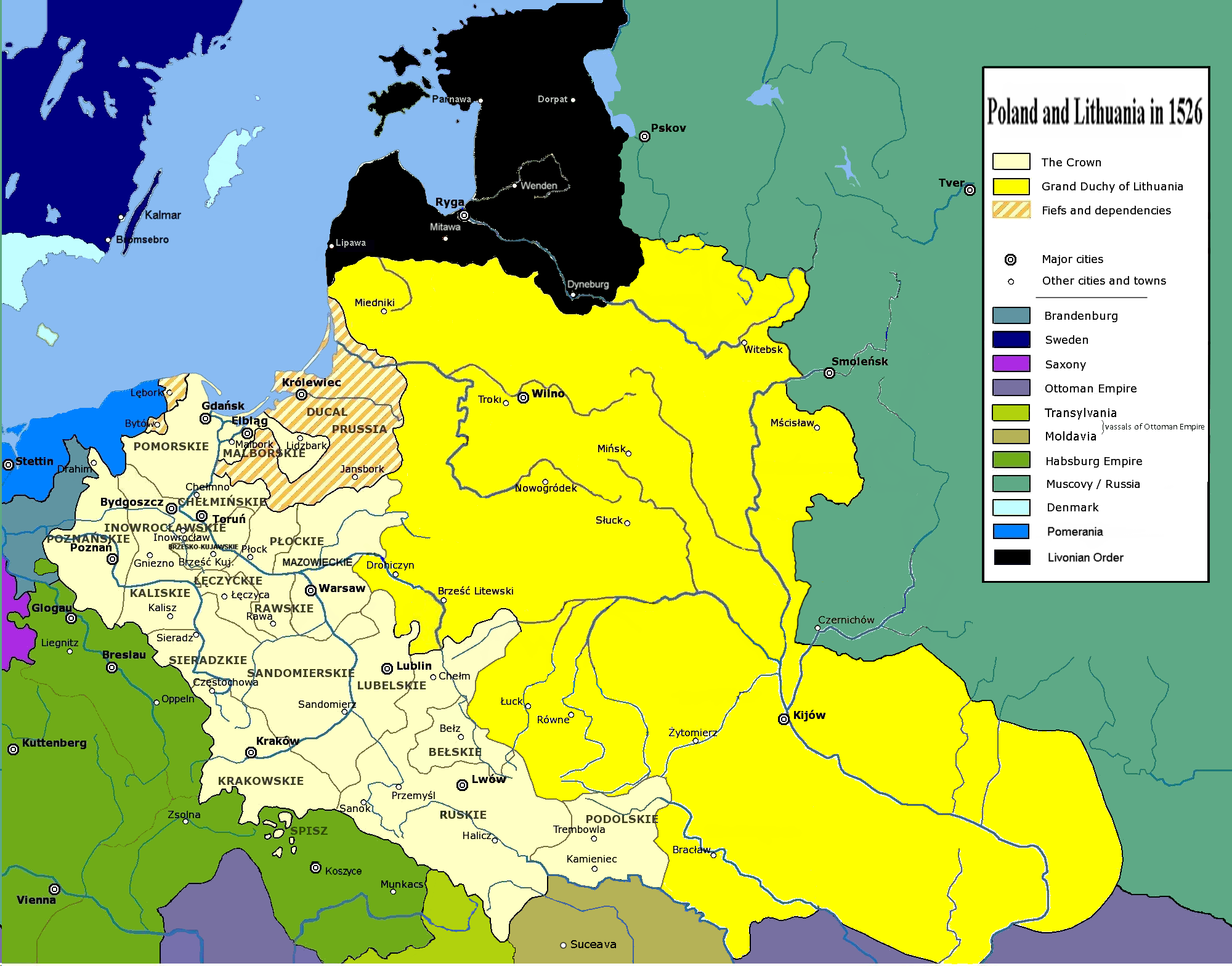
Map of Poland and Lithuania around 1526, with visible Polish–Lithuanian border

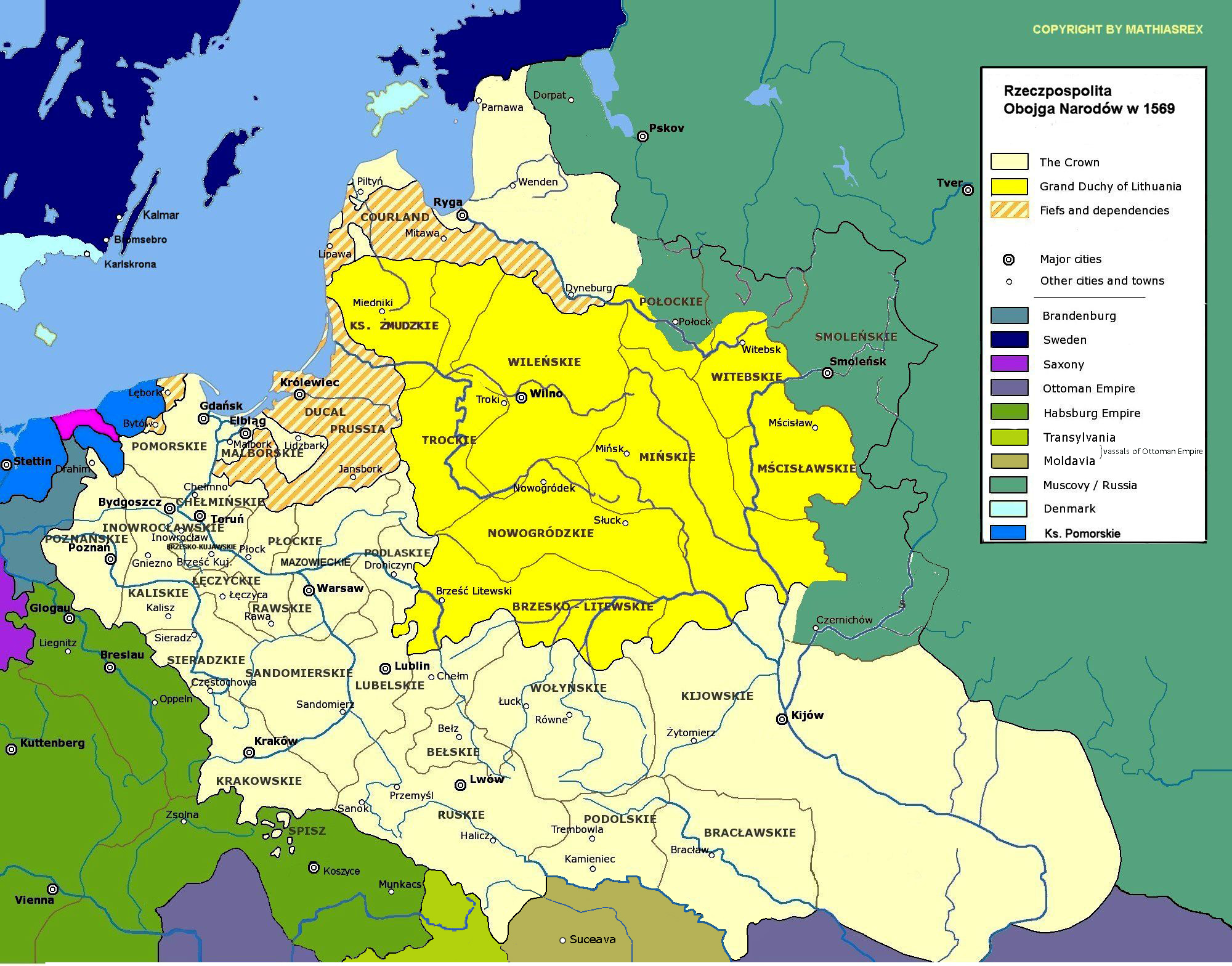
Map of the Polish–Lithuanian Commonwealth after its formation in 1569, with visible Polish–Lithuanian border. Ukrainian territories were transferred under the administrative control of the Crown of Poland.

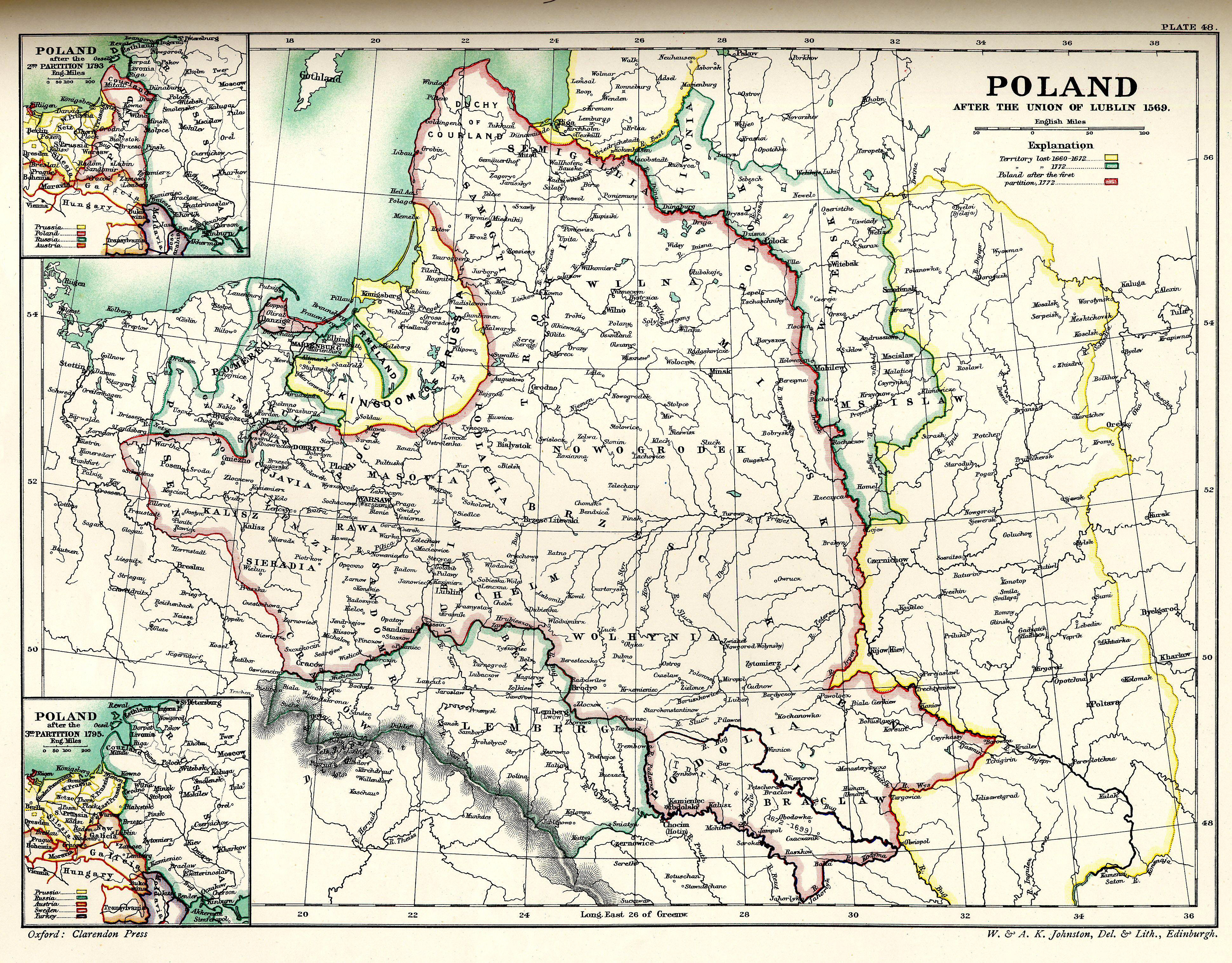
1888 English map of Poland and Lithuania circa 1795 CE, showing changes from 1569-1795

Map of Lithuania around 1867–1914, with visible Polish–Russian border (Lithuania did not exist at that time)

Polish–Lithuanian border around 1918–1939

== Middle ages ==
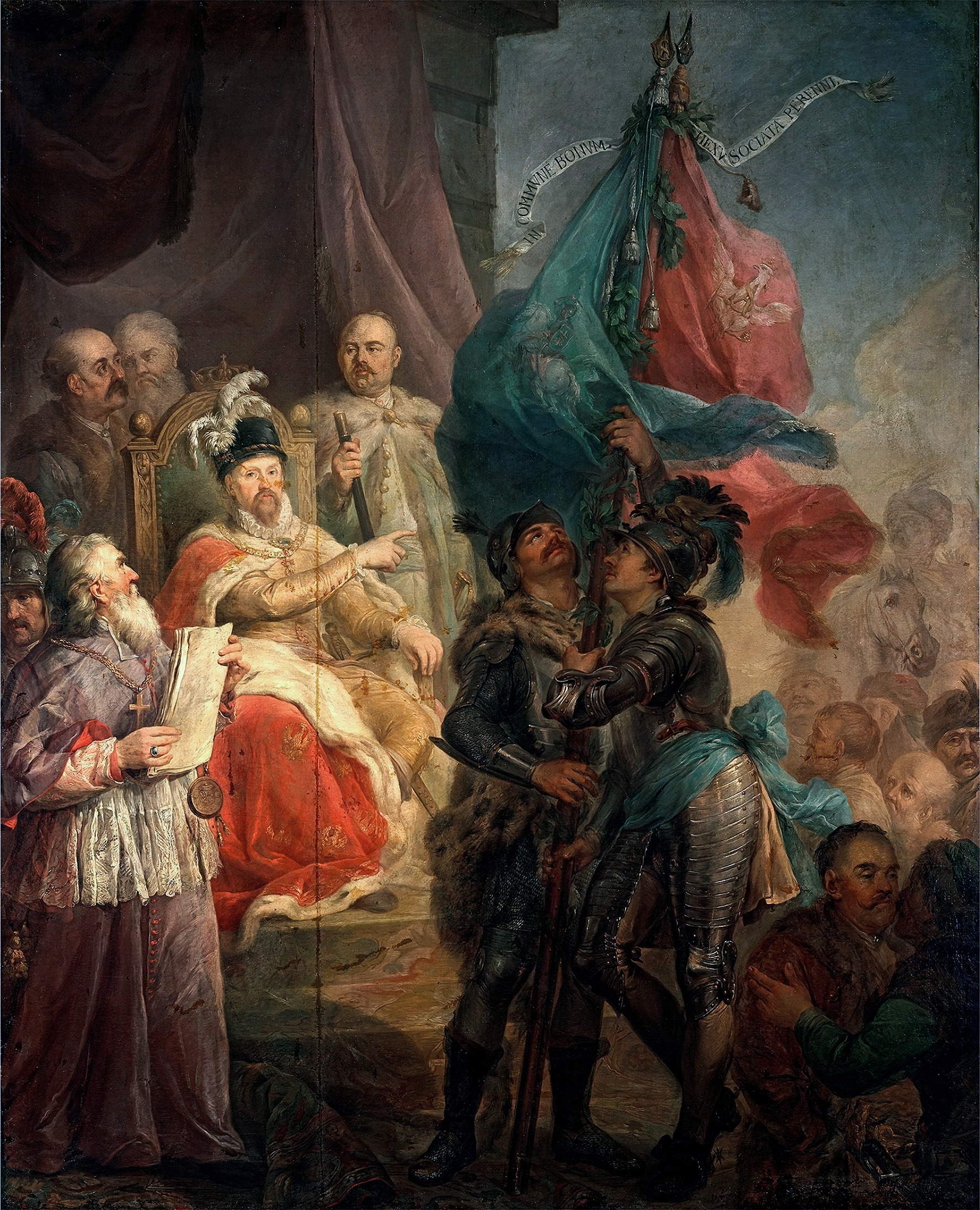
The Lublin Union of 1569, painted by Marcello Bacciarelli between 1785 and 1786

Lithuanian state dates to the 13th century, and it first established a border with Polish territories around the 14th century, after the destruction of the Old Prussian and Yotvingians tribes. Until that time most of contact between the two countries was limited to border military conflicts, such as Lithuanian raid on Duchy of Masovia in 1262, which killed Siemowit I of Masovia. This changed with a mid-1320s alliance between king of Poland, Władysław Łokietek, and Grand Duke of Lithuania, Gediminas. Gediminas daughter Aldona married Władysław Łokietek's son and future successor, Casimir III of Poland, in 1325, which led to improved relations. In 1358 a treaty between Duchy of Masovia and Grand Duchy of Lithuania outlined a border between the two for the first time. In 1385 the growing threat of the Teutonic Order to both countries led to a firmer alliance, the Union of Krewo, which signaled the beginning of a centuries-long Polish–Lithuanian union. This alliance was strengthened by the Polish-Lithuanian victory of the Teutonic Knights in the 1410 battle of Grunwald.

As Lithuania was increasingly threatened by the Muscovy (see Muscovite–Lithuanian Wars), it sought to strengthen its ties with Poland. The union reached an important milestone in 1569, when the Union of Lublin created a new federal state, the Polish–Lithuanian Commonwealth, which lasted until the Constitution of May 3, 1791 and partitions. The period of the partitions saw the reversal of the previous process of polonization, with the Lithuanian National Revival, giving new prominence to the Lithuanian language and culture.

== Interbellum ==
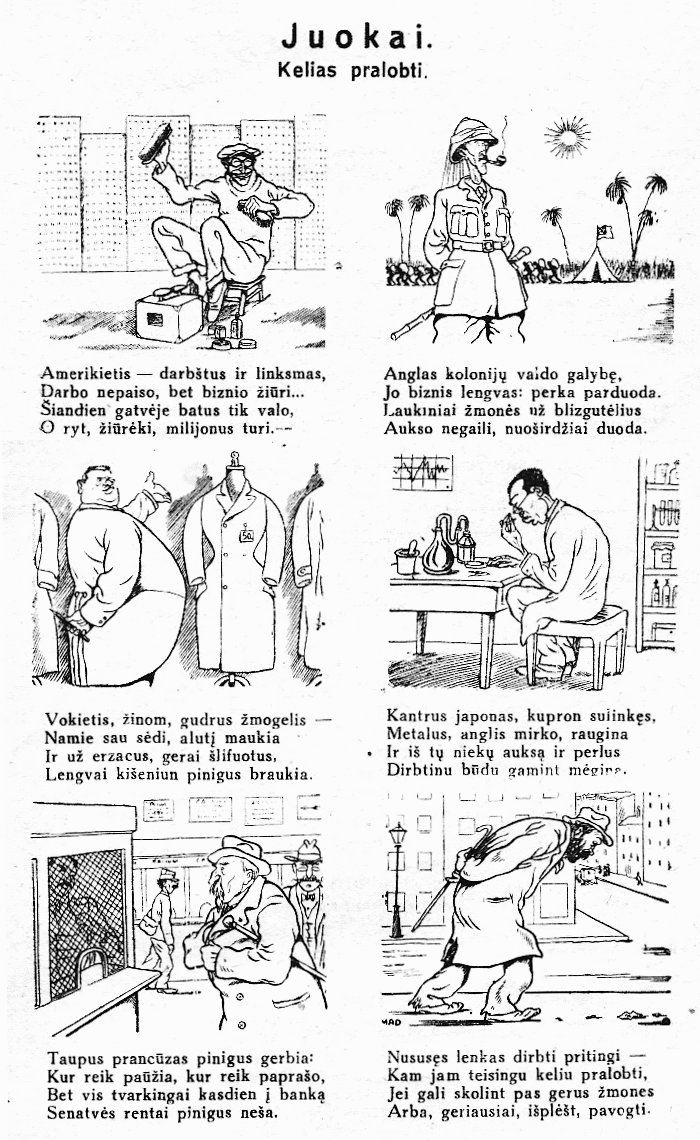
Anti-Polish cartoons were published in Lithuania during interbellum ...

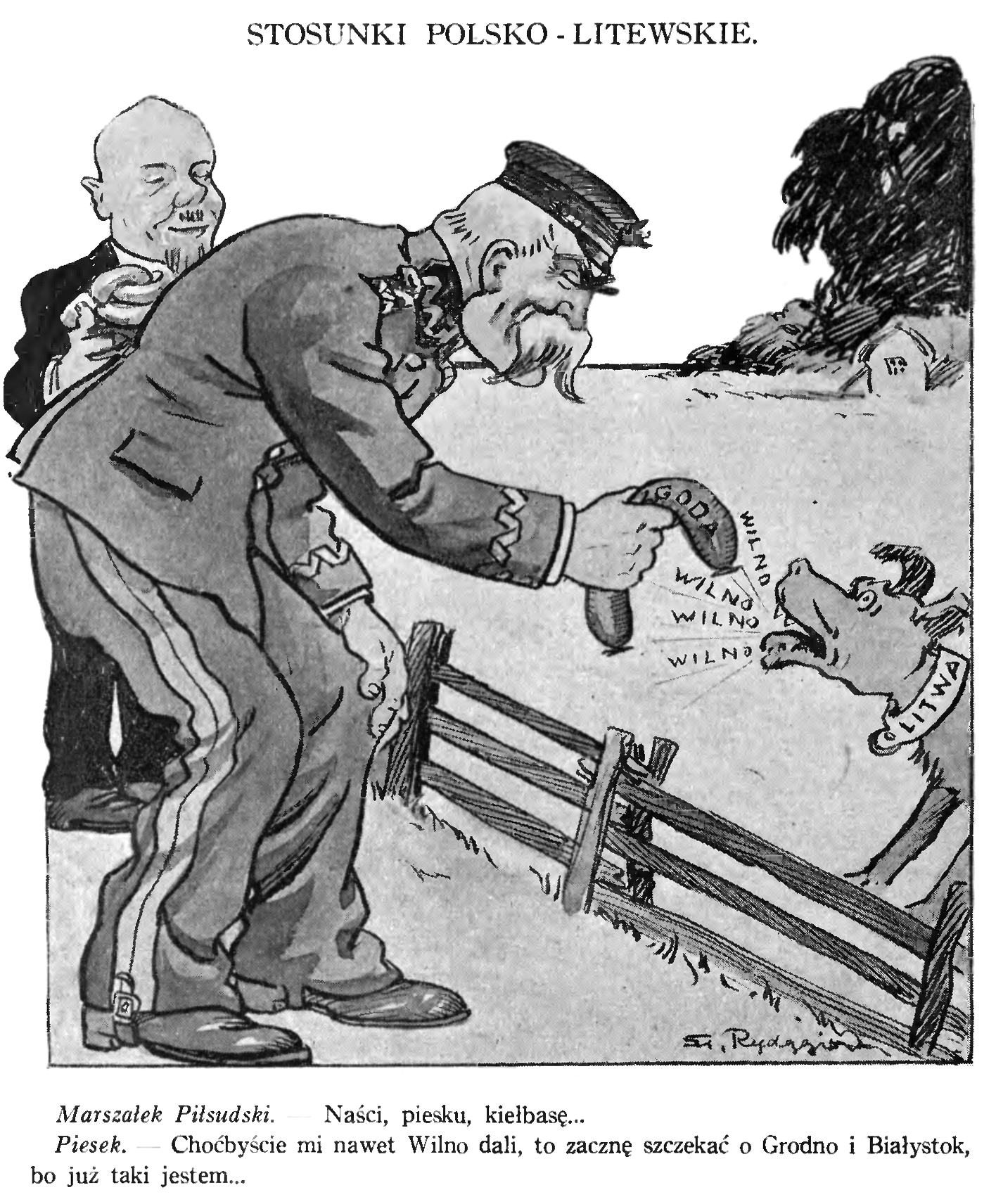
... and anti-Lithuanian cartoons were published in Poland.

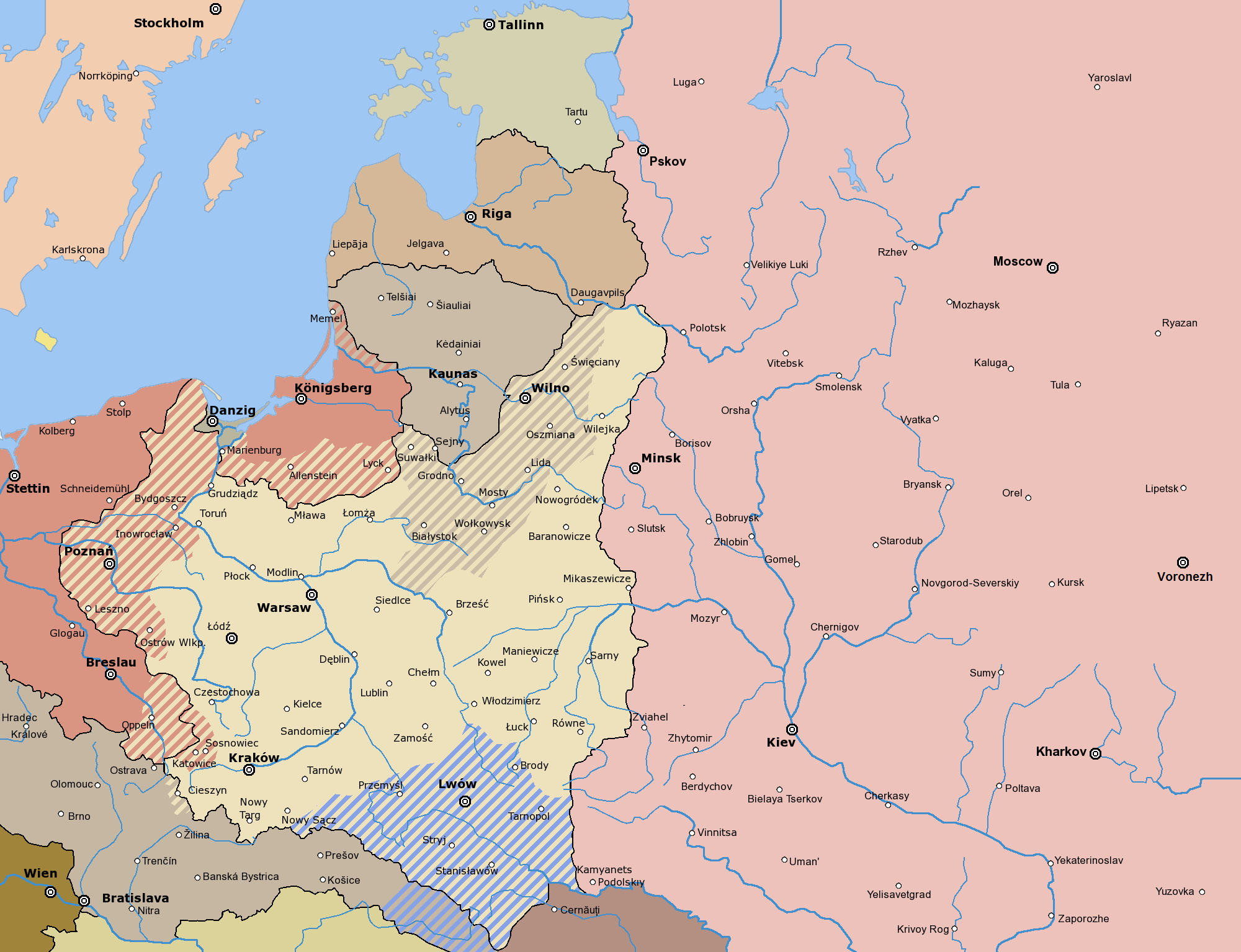
Map showing disputed territories between Lithuania, Poland and Germany after World War I

Despite federation proposals such as Międzymorze, after the First World War Lithuania chose to pursue independent statehood instead of recreating a previous union. Differences on border issues, particularly over the cities of Vilnius (Wilno) and Sejny (Seinai) led to the Polish–Lithuanian War and worsened relations for most of the interwar period.

Lithuanian–Polish relations continued to deteriorate, as Polish and Lithuanian forces skirmished in the background of the Polish–Soviet War (and Lithuanian–Soviet War). Polish Military Organization staged Sejny Uprising was met with massive outrage in Lithuania. Furthermore, the image of Poles deteriorated because of the uncovered plot to overthrow sovereign Lithuanian government by the Polish Military Organization, supported by the local Polish minority. The relations worsened further still as the Polish–Lithuanian War erupted, and Józef Piłsudski ordered Żeligowski's Mutiny. In the aftermath of the Polish annexation of the Republic of Central Lithuania, Lithuania severed diplomatic relations with Poland. Poland and Lithuania experienced notable crises in their relationship in 1927 (where a threat of renewed hostilities led to partial restoration of the diplomatic relations) and 1938 (when the 1938 Polish ultimatum to Lithuania forced Lithuania to agree to full restoration of the diplomatic relations). The League of Nations was involved in smoothing over the conflicts in 1919–20 and 1927.

After the events of 1919–20, Polish actions and the Poles themselves were viewed with a high level of suspicion in Lithuania, and vice versa. Both governments—in the era nationalism swept through Europe—treated their respective minorities harshly. In Lithuania, people declaring Polish ethnicity were officially described as Lithuanians who merely needed to be re-Lithuanianized, Polish-owned land were confiscated, Polish religious services, schools, publications, and voting rights were restricted. After Piłsudski's death, between 1935 and 1939, the Lithuanian minority in Poland was an object of Polonisation, with the government encouraging settlement of Polish army veterans in disputed regions. Almost all Lithuanian schools were closed (266) and almost all Lithuanian organizations were banned.

== World War II ==
The issue of Polish and Lithuanian relations during the Second World War is a controversial one, and some modern Lithuanian and Polish historians still differ in their interpretations of the related events, many of which are related to the treatment of Poles by the Lithuanian Nazi-collaborationist government and security forces, and the operations of Polish resistance organization of Armia Krajowa on territories inhabited by Lithuanians and Poles. In recent years a number of common academic conferences have started to bridge the gap between Lithuanian and Polish interpretations, but significant differences still remain.

== Communist era ==
The Second World War put an end to independent Polish and Lithuanian states. After the war, both former states fell under the domination of the Soviet Union. Poland was shifted westwards, thus giving up most of the disputed territories previously containing significant Lithuanian minority in the Second Polish Republic, those territories were incorporated into the Soviet Union as the Lithuanian and Belarusian Soviet Republics. At the same time many Poles from Kresy were allowed to leave the Soviet Union, and mostly were transferred west to Recovered Territories, and the Polish minority in Lithuania (or Lithuanian SSR) was also significantly downsized. The remaining Polish minority in Lithuania became subject to Lithuanization and Sovietization policies.

Under the eye of the Soviet Union, the various ethnic groups in the Eastern Bloc were to cooperate peacefully. To prevent creation or recreation of historical alliances that could weaken the Soviet regime, Soviet policy was aimed at minimizing the role of the historical ties between those nations, and there were few contacts of any significance between Poland and Lithuania during that period.

The Polish government-in-exile and Lithuanian Diplomatic Service in-exile also had no relations or contact during the same time period.

== Modern times ==
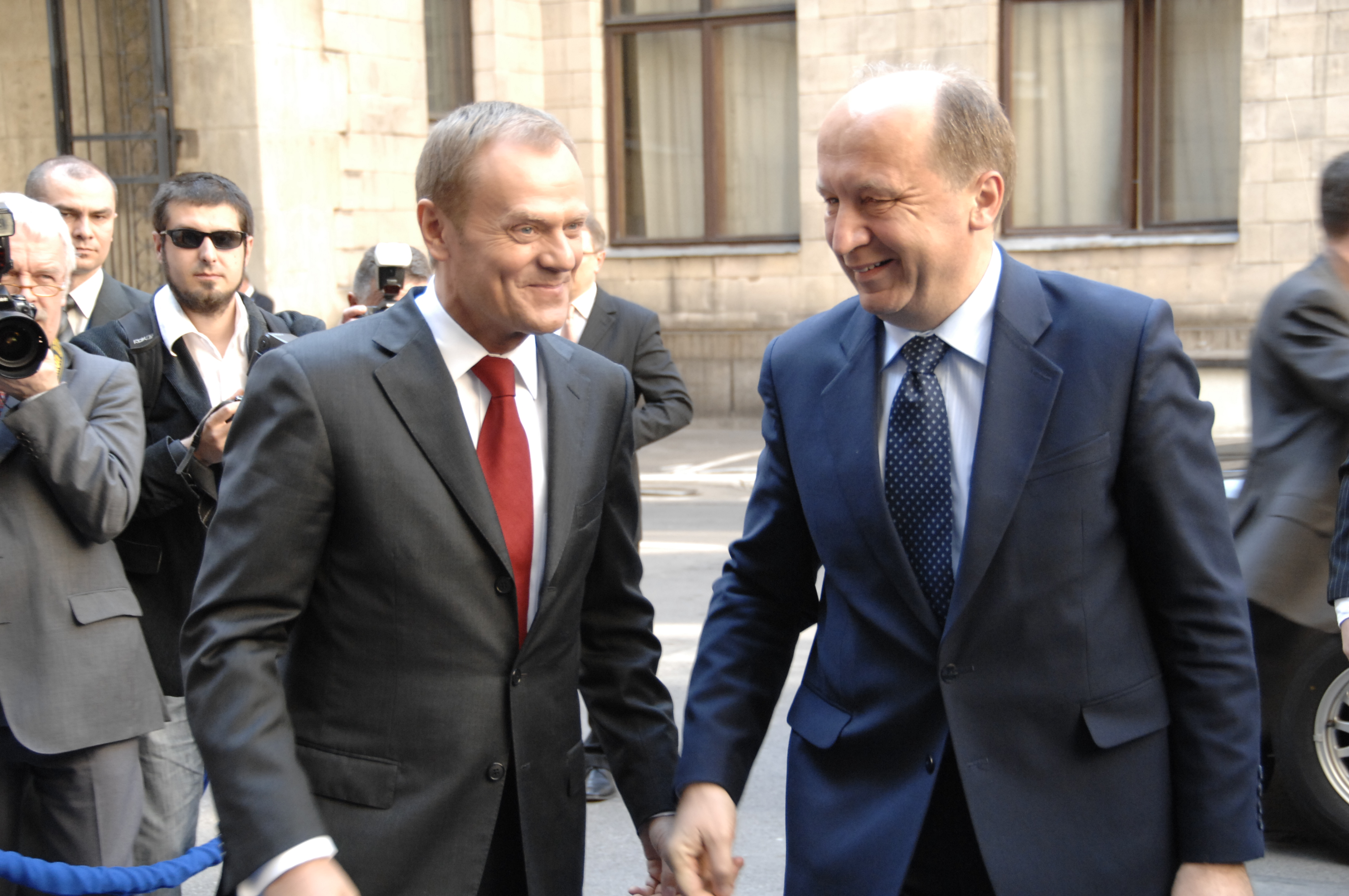
Polish and Lithuanian leaders: Donald Tusk and Andrius Kubilius in Warsaw, 2009

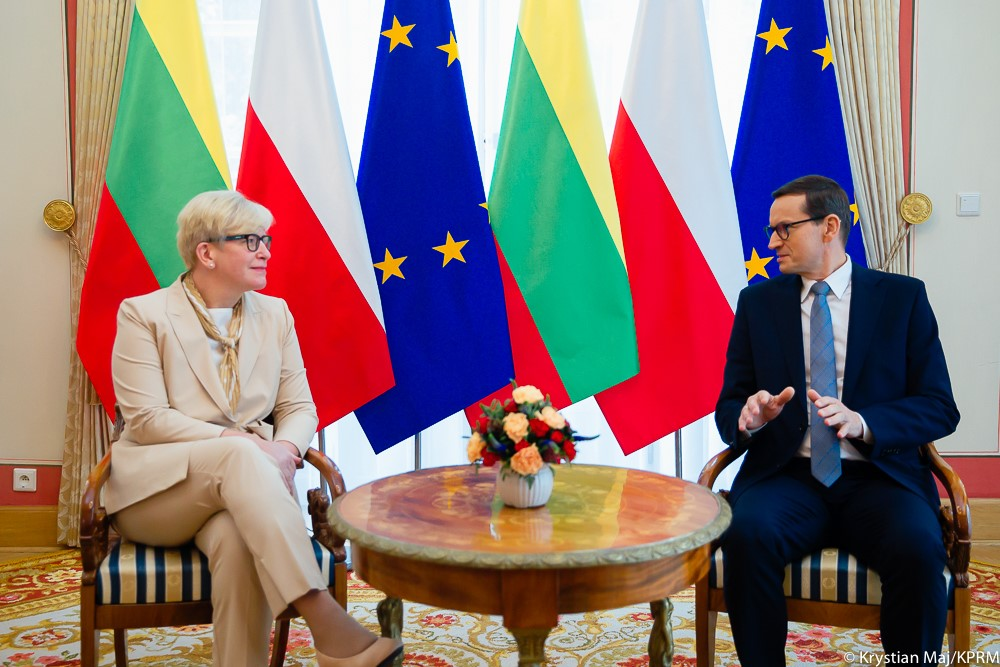
Polish prime minister Mateusz Morawiecki and Lithuanian prime minister Ingrida Šimonytė at the KPRM in 2021

The fall of communism in the years between 1989 and 1991 led to a formal reestablishment of relations by the Polish and Lithuanian states. Poland was highly supportive of Lithuanian independence, and became one of the first countries to recognize independent Lithuania (on 26 August 1991). Despite that, there was a relative crisis in the early 1990s, due to alleged Lithuanian mistreatment of its Polish minority, and Lithuanian concerns that Poland sought again to put Lithuania under its sphere of influence, or even issue territorial claims. After a few years, the situation normalized, and relations improved. On 28 September 1992 the foreign ministers of both nations signed a declaration of friendship and neighborly relations and a consular convention, rejecting any territorial claims and promising to respect the rights of their corresponding minorities. On 26 April 1994 during the meeting of presidents of both countries in Vilnius they concluded the mutual Friendship Treaty. Both countries have since joined NATO (Poland in 1999, Lithuania in 2004, with Poland being a vocal supporter of Lithuania's accession) and the European Union (both in 2004).

However, in the late 2000s, disagreements over Lithuania's implementation of the Friendship Treaty have soured relations and cooperation on energy issues. The electricity grids of Poland and Lithuania are inter-connected but the gas pipelines of the two countries are only connected through a Russian-controlled gas pipeline. Previously stated intentions have been stalled by the row over the Friendship Treaty. Polish president Bronisław Komorowski during a visit to Lithuania in February 2011 expressed concerns over the deterioration of relations, and noted that the full implementation of the Friendship Treaty should allow Poles in Lithuania to use the original forms of their surnames and to access education in Polish. In case C-391/09 – Runevič-Vardyn and Wardyn the European Court of Justice ruled that the Lithuanian policy on surnames conforms to the EU law.

In 2019, newly elected President of Lithuania Gitanas Nausėda exclusively made his first official foreign visit to Warsaw, Poland where he met with the President of Poland Andrzej Duda. Invited by Nausėda, Duda, his wife First Lady of Poland Agata Kornhauser-Duda and the Representative Honor Guard Regiment of the Polish Armed Forces participated in the 1863–1864 uprising against Tsarist rule commanders and participants state funeral in Vilnius on 22 November 2019. During his visit to Vilnius, Duda highlighted the Central European nations' unity importance for their independence.

On 15 July 2020, a large stone with engraved Vytis was erected by the Lithuanians near the monument site of Grunwald in order to commemorate the 610th year of the Battle of Grunwald and to celebrate the united victory of both nations against the Teutonic knights. That years commemoration ceremony was marked by the meeting of Lithuanian and Polish presidents Gitanas Nausėda and Andrzej Duda.

On 28 July 2020, Poland, Lithuania and Ukraine entered into a new international collaboration format known as the "Lublin Triangle". It was signed in the city of Lublin, eastern Poland, by the Foreign Ministers of Poland, Lithuania and Ukraine: Jacek Czaputowicz, Linas Linkevičius and Dmytro Kuleba respectively. The cooperation will not only concern defense issues but will also involve strengthening economic cooperation, trade, and tourism between the three countries. A joint declaration on the creation of the Lublin triangle stressed the importance of intensifying the cooperation between the EU, NATO, and the Eastern Partnership and paying special attention to the development of the Three Seas Initiative.

On 17 September 2021, Polish and Lithuanian Prime Ministers Mateusz Morawiecki and Ingrida Šimonytė signed an agreement on bilateral cooperation after attending an intergovernmental meeting in Warsaw. The Polish PM stated that "This is a further step towards closer economic, commercial, business and investment ties" between Poland and Lithuania which is very important considering the current geopolitical challenges faced by the two nations. The talks also covered such key areas as energy, climate, culture, science and education.

On 26 November 2022, a Lublin Triangle format meeting between the Prime Ministers of Poland, Lithuania and Ukraine was held in Kyiv. In a joint statement the leaders stressed the role of the Lublin Triangle in "consolidating international support for Ukraine in countering Russia's armed aggression", "confirmed their readiness to continue active cooperation in restoring the territorial integrity and sovereignty of Ukraine within its internationally recognized borders", "condemned systemic war crimes committed by Russia's forces in regions of Ukraine" and "confirmed the further importance of trilateral cooperation in such areas as: military and defense cooperation using NATO and the EU potential".

== Diaspora ==
According to census data from 2011, there were 200,317 Poles living in Lithuania and 7,863 Lithuanians living in Poland, however, according to the Lithuanian embassy in Poland, the estimated number of Lithuanian inhabitants in Poland is about 15,000.

== The European Union and NATO ==
Both countries became members of the European Union in 2004. Poland joined NATO in 1999. Lithuania joined NATO in 2004.

== Diplomatic missions ==
- Lithuania has an embassy in Warsaw and a consulate in Sejny.
- Poland has an embassy in Vilnius.
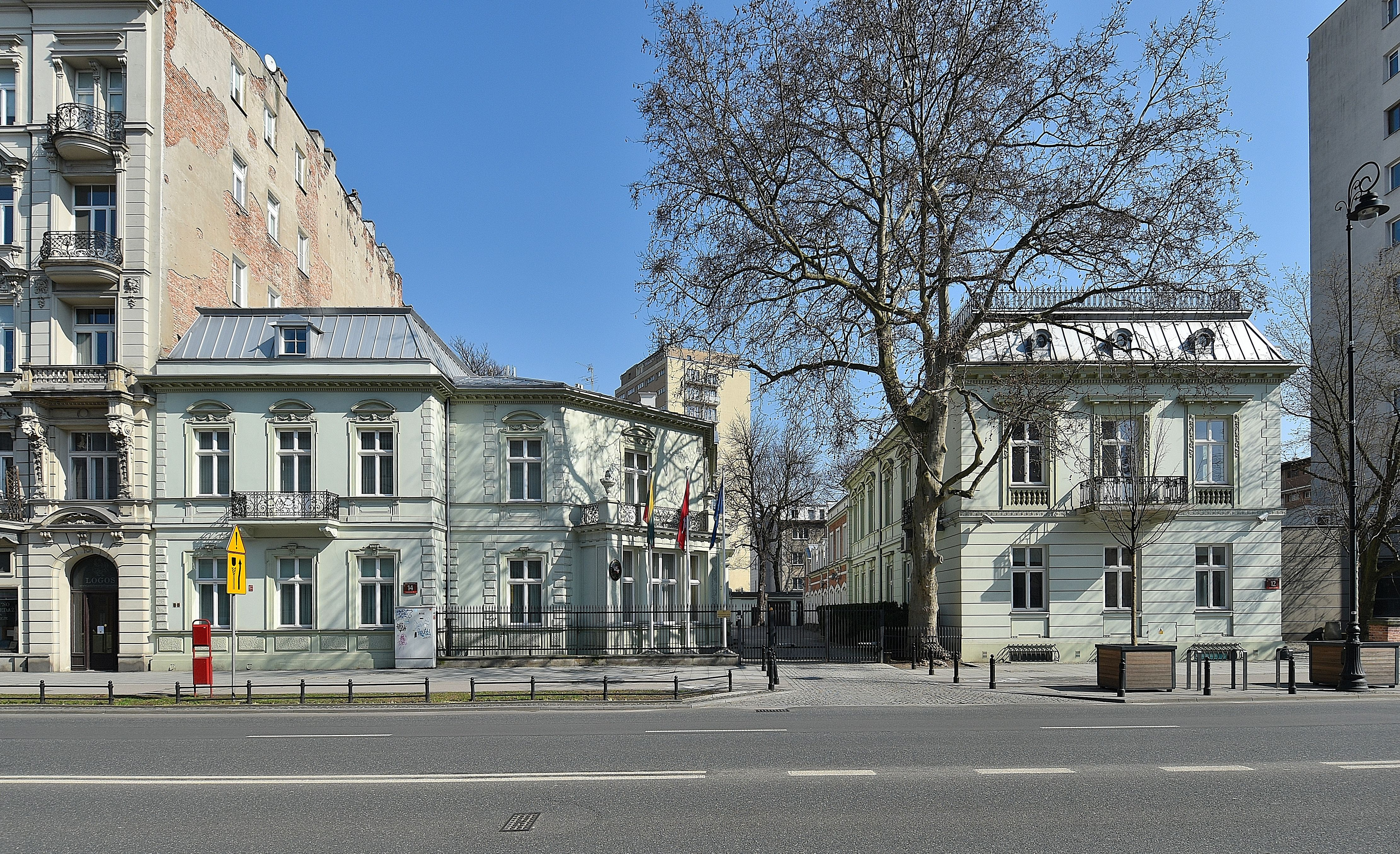
Embassy of Lithuania in Warsaw

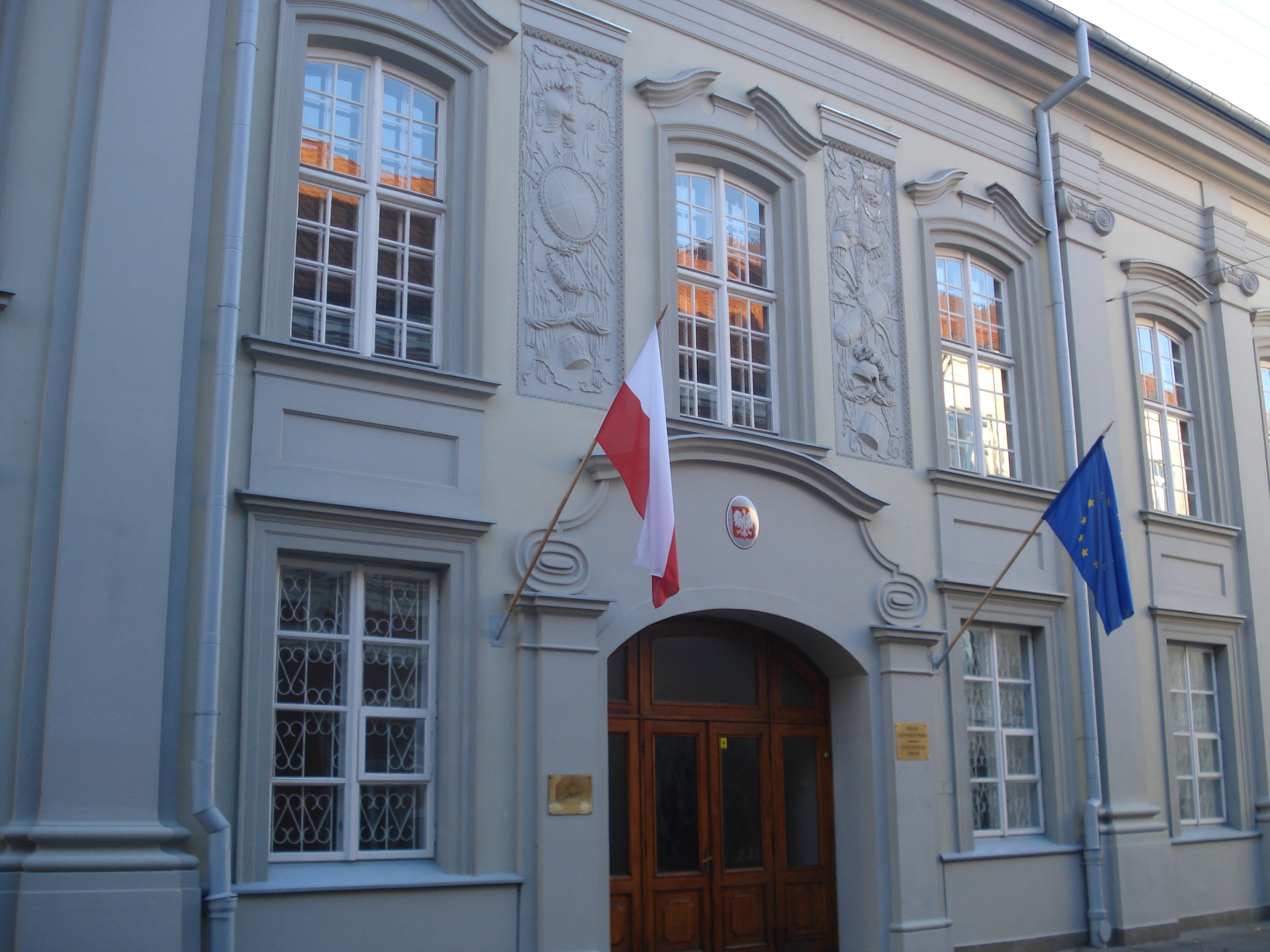
Embassy of Poland in Vilnius

== See also ==
- Lithuanian–Polish–Ukrainian Brigade
- 1938 Polish ultimatum to Lithuania
- Polish–Lithuanian Commonwealth
- Foreign relations of Lithuania
- Foreign relations of Poland
- Lithuanian minority in Poland
- Polish minority in Lithuania
