= Chana Blanksztejn =

Polish-Jewish writer and journalist

- Born: Chana Shur c. 1860 Vilna, Russian Empire
- Died: 1939
- Occupation: Short story writer

Chana Blanksztejn (born c. 1860 in Vilna; died 1939) was a Polish-Jewish writer and journalist, predominantly active in Vilna (now Vilnius, Lithuania). Noted for her significant contributions in literature and journalism, Blanksztejn was also recognised for her zealous advocacy of women's suffrage. In the 1922 Polish legislative election, she entered as a candidate from the Jewish Democratic People's Bloc, a wing of the Folkspartei, although she did not secure a win.

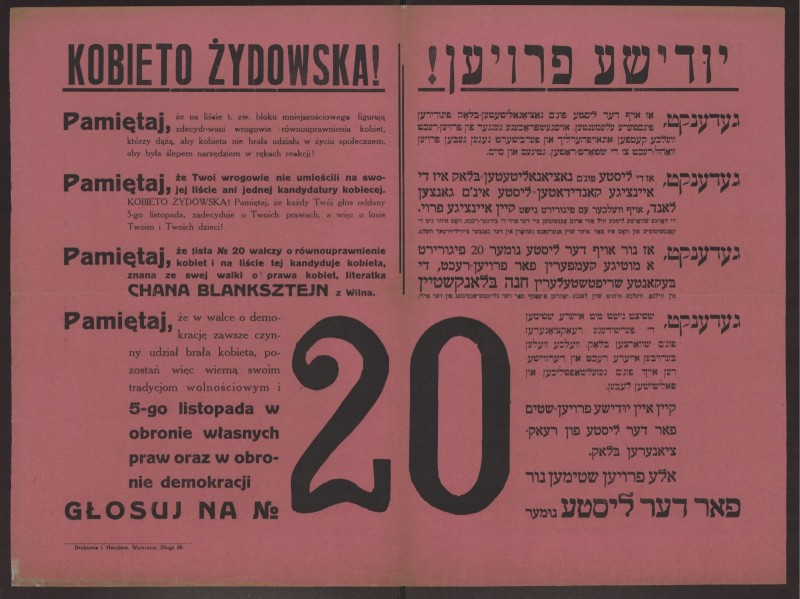
1922 poster promoting Chana Blanksztejn for member of parliament of the Second Polish Republic

== Literary work ==
Blanksztejn's literary work includes a posthumous collection of short stories titled Fear and Other Stories, initially written in Yiddish and published in 1939. These tales provide a glimpse into the waning period of Eastern European Jewish culture and portray a modern outlook on the world, with the primary settings in Vilna and several locations across Europe, often against the backdrop of World War I and the Russian Civil War. The stories explore themes of female independence, equality, and fulfilling work, among others.

In 2022, Wayne University Press published Fear and Other Stories translated into English by Anita Norich.

== Sources ==
- Ellen Kellman (2007). Piotr Paziński (ed.). "Feminizm i literatura. Rola Chany Blanksztejn w międzywojennym Wilnie" [Feminism and Literature: The role of Chana Blanksztejn in inter-war Wilno]. Midrasz (in Polish) (10). Warsaw: Stowarzyszenie Midrasz: 27–36. ISSN 1428-121X.
