= Ulaniv-style potatoes =

Ukrainian fried potato dish

Картопля по-уланівськи
- Type: side dish
- Place of origin: Ukraine, USSR
- Region or state: Vinnytsia Oblast
- Created by: Glafira Vasylivna Dorosh
- Serving temperature: hot
- Main ingredients: potato, oil, salt

Ulaniv-style potatoes (Ukrainian: Картопля по-уланівськи) is a potato dish with garlic sauce, invented in 1947 by Ukrainian chef Glafira Dorosh, from the village Ulaniv in the Vinnytsia Oblast.

== History ==
Glafira Dorosh worked as a cook at the local café Українка. She cut up small potatoes and put them in a pot of butter and poured garlic sauce over it.

On November 11, 1965, Dorosh was awarded the Order of the Red Banner of Labor in Moscow. The day before, the cook from village prepared her famous dish for journalists at a Moscow restaurant. Glafira Vasylivna Dorosh is the only one recipient of the Order of the Red Banner of Labor in the USSR for a culinary invention. Since 1966, Glafira Vasylivna has been a member of the Vinnytsia Regional Council of People's Deputies..

A mini-museum of Dorosh opened in Ulaniv, and on August 21, 2021, the “Ulanivsky Potatoes” festival was held.
