= Ivan Gevorkyan =

Armenian surgeon and scientist

Ivan Khristoforovich Gevorkyan
- Born: Hovannes Gevorkyan; March 28, 1907; Karmir, Gavar, Russian Empire
- Died: October 19, 1989 (aged 82); Yerevan, Armenian SSR, USSR
- Awards: Order of the Red Star (1); Order of the Red Banner of Labour (1)

Academic background
- Education: Leningrad Medical University

Academic work
- Discipline: Medicine, Surgery, Science
- Institutions: Yerevan Medical Institute

Ivan Khristoforovich Gevorkyan, born Hovannes Khachaturi Gevorkyan (Armenian: Հովհաննես Խաչատուրի Գևորգյան; Russian: Иван Христофорович Геворкян; March 28, 1907 – October 19, 1989), was a Soviet Armenian surgeon and scientist who published 10 monographs and more than 230 scientific papers. His main research was dedicated to anesthesia, blood transfusion, the treatment of endarteritis of extremities and other surgical illnesses.

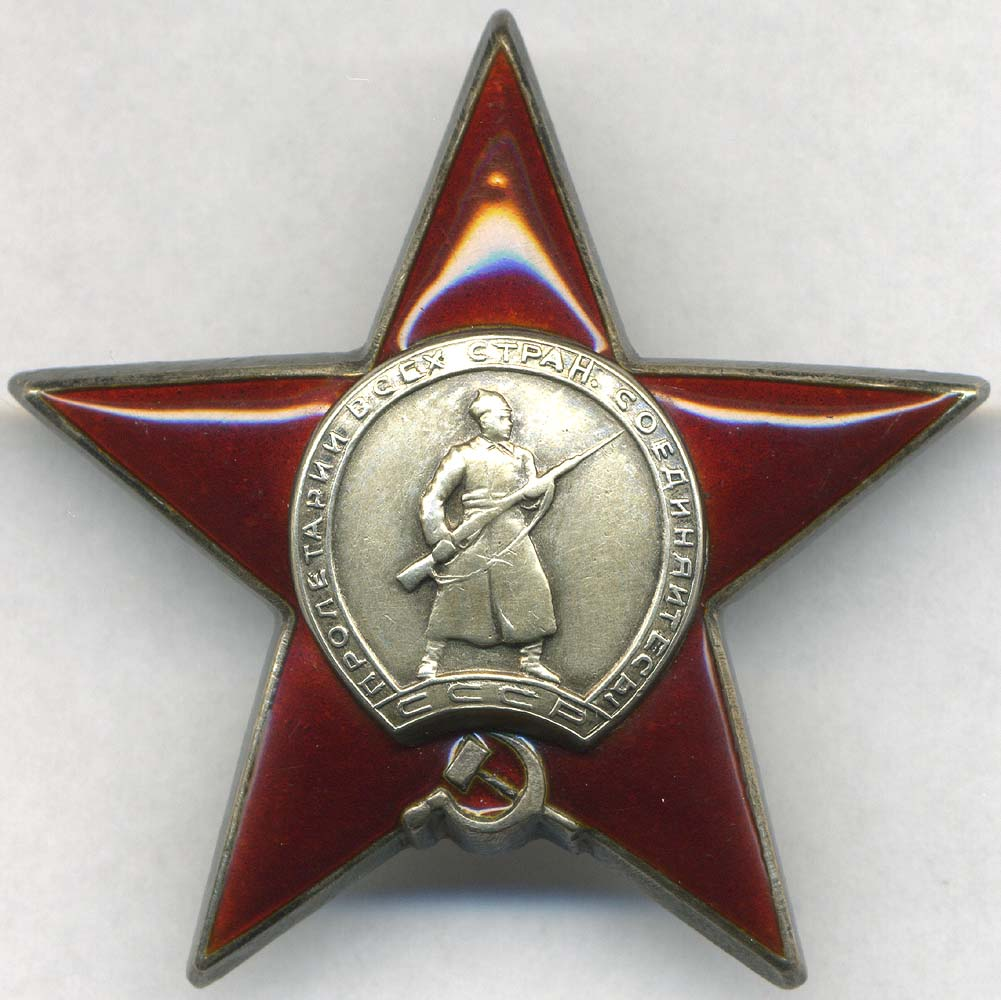
Ivan Gevorkyan was awarded the Order of the Red Star.

== Personal life ==
Ivan Gevorkyan was born in the village Karmir, near the city of Gavar in Armenia. He graduated from medical school in Leningrad in 1930. During World War II he was a military surgeon, and from 1943, he served as the Chief Surgeon of Yerevan Military Hospital.

== Achievements ==
From 1952-1979 Gevorkyan was the chairman of the Department of Surgery of Yerevan State Medical Institute. Under his leadership 10 doctoral and 30 master's theses were completed. In 1961 he was named an honored scientist of the Armenian SSR. In 1962 Professor Gevorkyan was elected to the ASSR Academy of Sciences as a Corresponding Member, and in 1963 he was elected a member of the Surgeon's International Society in Rome. For many years Gevorkyan performed the duties of chief surgeon of Armenia and was a founder of the Armenian Surgical Association. He was awarded the Order of the Red Banner, the Order of the Red Star, and a number of other medals.

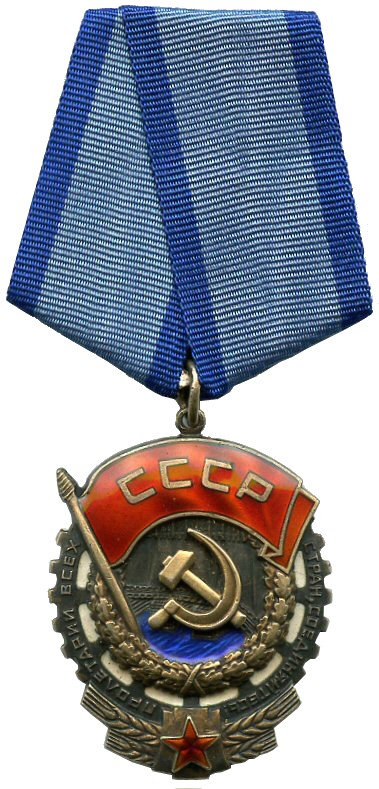
Ivan Gevorkyan was awarded the Order of the Red Banner of Labor.

== Honors and achievements ==
- Honored Scientist of the Armenian SSR (1961)
- Doctor of Medicine (1952)
- Member of the Academy of Sciences of the Armenian SSR (1962).
- Member of International Academy of Surgeons (1963).
- Order of the Red Star
- Order of the Red Banner

== List of main works ==
- Intra-arterial Medication Use in Surgery (1958), Published in Moscow, Russia
- Blood Flow Velocity in the Pathology of Limb Vessels (1976)
- Obliterating Endarteritis of Extremities, 152 c. silt. 26 cm, Yerevan Publishing House of the Armenian SSR in 1978
- Handbook for the management of patients with certain acute surgical diseases of the abdomen: (Students of Art. Courses and doctors) / Gevorkyan IH, 140 p. 20 cm, Yerevan Scientific-method. Room. Ministry of Higher Education of the Armenian SSR in 1981
- Peritoneal Mesothelioma (1984)
- Regional Infusion of drugs in the prevention and treatment of complex surgical infection / I. H. Gevorkyan, 136, [1] p. silt. Yerevan Hayastan 1987
- Postoperative Adhesive Small Bowel Obstruction, Its Detection, Treatment, and Prevention / IH Gevorkyan, Armenian SSR Academy of Sciences, Institute of Physiology. Orbeli, 103. silt. 20 cm, Yerevan Academy of Sciences of Armenian SSR, 1990
