= Nicolay Paskevich =

American painter (1907–2003)

- Mykolas Paškevičius
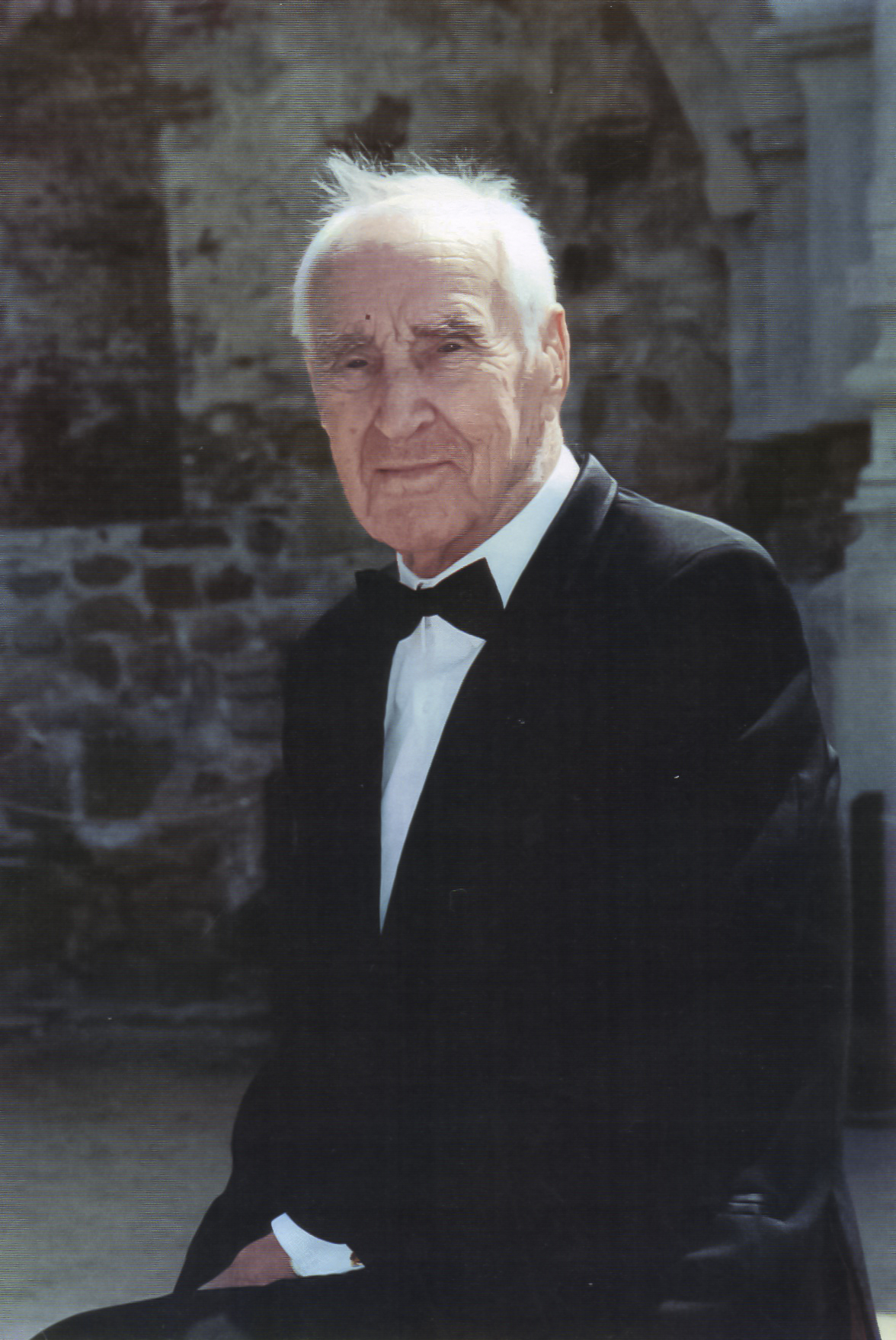
- Born: August 18, 1907; Riga, Latvia
- Died: May 19, 2003 (aged 95); Anaheim, Orange County, California
- Education: Vitebsk Art School; Academy of Arts, Leningrad
- Awards: Order of the Red Banner of Labour; 1940

Nicolay Paskevich (Russian: Nikolai Aleksandrovich Paskevich, Lithuanian: Mykolas Paškevičius, born: 18 August 1907 in Riga, Latvia, died: 19 May 2003) was a Russian painter working mostly in ink, acrylic, and pastel, exhibiting an interest in action, power, music, and western motifs. Paskevich was the recipient of the Order of the Red Banner of Labour.

== Biography ==
Paskevich was born in Riga, Latvia in 1907. His father was from Belarus, his mother was from Vilnius. In 1914, his family moved to Vitebsk, Belarus where he received his primary education. In 1922, Paskevich began studying at the Vitebsk Art School under the mentoring of Kazimir Malevich, V. Volkov and T. Ende. Upon graduation Paskevich was accepted by the Academy of Arts in Leningrad where he studied under artists Arkady Rylov and Kuzma Petrov-Vodkin. Having finished his studies at the Academy, he returned to Minsk and worked independently as an artist. Here he had his work exhibited in Moscow's Tretyakov Gallery. In 1933 he married artist Ona Dokalskaitė, then known as Galina Alfonsovna Dokalskaya.

When the Germans occupied Minsk at the beginning of World War II, the Paskevichs managed to escape to Kaunas, Lithuania, where they participated in the artistic life of the city for a few years. In 1940, prior to the German invasion during WW II, Paskevich received the Red Banner Badge as an artist in the socialist realism movement in the USSR and dined at the Kremlin with Joseph Stalin. In 1944, he fled the war again and arrived in Bavaria, where he and his family were given shelter by the Americans in a Displaced Persons' Camp. In 1949 the Paskevich family emigrated to the United States. He settled in New York City and started working for the City Services. Later Paskevich moved in the field of commercial art.

In 1994, Paskevich published his autobiography Mykolas Paškevičius.

== Exhibitions ==
- Tretyakov Gallery, 1938
- Moscow, Industry of Socialism, 1939
- Kaunas, Lithuania, 1943
- Hammer Galleries, 1957
- The Shoeneman Gallery, 1959
- Southampton City Art Gallery, 1971
- Belarusian National Arts Museum, May 1993
- Anaheim Museum, January - March 1998
- Mission San Juan Capistrano Soldier's Barracks Gallery, February - March 2000

== Notable works ==
- Kaminkrėtys, 1945
- Liberation, 1947
- Portrait of a Young Woman, 1954
- Swan Lake, 1965
- Indian attack, 1975, 1988
- Be content, 1991
