= Ona Dokalskaitė-Paškevičienė =

American painter

Ona Dokalskaitė-Paškevičienė (1912 – October 14, 2007, a.k.a. Galina Alfonsovna Dokalskaya) was a Lithuanian-American painter.

== Biography ==
Ona Dokalskaitė was born in Sejny, Congress Poland, Russian Empire (now in Poland). She studied drawing under Juozas Zikaras at the Panevėžys gymnasium. In 1928 she moved with her widowed mother to what is now Belarus. After the graduation from Vitebsk Arts Tekhnikum in 1932 she earned her living by drawing caricatures for Belarusian magazines and newspapers. In 1938 she took part in an exhibition at the Tretyakov Gallery in Moscow.

In 1933 she met in Minsk and married artist Nicolay Paskevich When the advancing Nazi German army took Minsk, the family had to flee. With them they had Ona's sister's baby daughter Birutė (now Birute Zuyovich; who was eventually adopted by Ona's family, because both Ona and her sister, also named Birutė, an actress, thought of each other that they perished, and had reunion only 50 years later). In 1942 she eventually reached Lithuania and settled in Kaunas. Here they had their own daughter Alyja (Alyna) (Alyja has become an artist as well, a costume designer at Walt Disney theme parks known under the name Alyja Kalinich.)

With the advance of Red Army, the family tried to flee to Switzerland, but they were placed into the displaced persons camp in the American Zone of Germany in 1944. In 1949 they moved to the United States. After living in New York, in 1982 the family moved to Santa Monica.

== Work ==
Danas Lapkus, and art editor of the Lituanus magazine, describes her artistic style as based on both realism and romanticism, "a supple new growth upon the trunk of Socialist Realism".
