= Olga Avilova =

Ukrainian surgeon

- Born: 10 September 1918; Bezhitsa, Bryansk, RSFSR
- Died: 27 December 2009 (aged 91); Kyiv, Ukraine
- Burial place: Berkovets Cemetery, Kyiv
- Education: Smolensk State Medical Institute
- Occupation: Surgeon

Olga Matveyevna Avilova (10 September 1918, Bezhitsa, Bryansk – 27 December 2009, Kyiv) was a Soviet Russian and Ukrainian surgeon, medical researcher in the area of cardiothoracic surgery and pulmonology, pedagogue, Doctor of Medical Sciences (1974), professor (1975), and the head of the department of cardiothoracic surgery and pulmonology at the Kiev Institute of Advanced Training for Physicians (1975–1988). She was a laureate of the State Prize of the USSR in the areas of science and technology (1974), an Honored Scientist of the USSR (1982), and an Honored Doctor of the USSR (1962).

== Biography ==
Avilova was born in Bezhitsa (now the administrative division of Bryansk).

She was a graduate of Smolensk State Medical Institute (1941). She participated in the Great Patriotic War. She worked as a surgeon for the active front of the army and later as head of the surgical department at the Bryansk regional hospital.

Since 1957, she was head of the department at Kyiv Medical Institute.

In 1974, she defended her doctoral dissertation "Resection of the bronchi and mediastinal trachea." She was a student of academician Nikolai Amosov.

== Scientific activities ==
Under the leadership of O. M. Avilova an emergency service was created for victims of chest trauma, spontaneous pneumothorax, foreign bodies in the lungs and the esophagus. She was the founder of the department of polytrauma.

She was the author of about 300 scientific works, including 2 monographs. She was an inventor (with at least 34 inventions), and patent holder (in particular, "Method for the treatment of expiratory stenosis of the trachea and bronchi").

Under her leadership one Doctor of Science dissertation and nineteen Candidates of Sciences dissertations were completed.

=== Selected works ===
- Transpleural resections for esophageal and cardial tumors (1960)
- Resection of the bronchi and mediastinal trachea (1971)
- Thoracoscopy in emergency thoracic surgery (1986)
- Chronic esophageal fistulas (1987)

== Awards ==
- Order of the Patriotic War
- Lenin Prize
- Order of the Red Star
- Red Banner of Labor
- USSR State Prize (1974)

== Memorial ==
She died on 27 December 2009 in Kyiv. She was buried in the capitol at Berkovets Cemetery.

On the eve of the 100th anniversary of the birth of Olga Avilova, the National Bank of Ukraine in September 2018 issued a commemorative coin dedicated to her from the series "Outstanding Figures of Ukraine." On the obverse of the coin, a stylized composition is placed on a mirrored background, symbolizing thoracic surgery. On the reverse there is a portrait of Olga Avilova with a signature under it. It also contains the dates of her birth and death: 1918–2009.
