= Andrei Frost =

Soviet chemist and professor

- Андрей Фрост
- Born: September 21 [O.S. September 8] ,1906; Oryol, Russian Empire
- Died: 4 August 1952 (aged 45); Baku, Soviet Union
- Education: Moscow State University
- Awards: Order of the Red Banner of Labor
- Scientific career
- Fields: Physical chemistry
- Workplaces: Leningrad State University, Leningrad State Institute of Technology, Mendeleev University

Andrei Vladimirovich Frost (Russian: Андрей Владимирович Фрост; September 21 [O.S. September 8] ,1906 - August 4, 1952) was a Soviet chemist, Doctor of Sciences in Chemistry, and Professor (1940) specializing in physical chemistry. He established one of the largest schools of thought in physical chemistry in the USSR. His research into olefins and catalytic transformations had significant implications for the development of catalytic cracking in the oil refinery industry in the Soviet Union.

== Biography ==
Frost was born in Oryol on September 21, 1906. He started working as a sample preparation technician at a pharmaceutical facility when he was 13 years old; later, he served as a laboratory assistant at a governorate laboratory of the Supreme Soviet of National Economics. Concurrently, he was attending Rabfak, from which he graduated with an external degree. After obtaining a document comparable to a middle school diploma, he moved to Moscow and enrolled in Moscow State University’s Department of Chemistry, from which he graduated in 1927. After moving from Moscow to Leningrad in 1928, he secured a position at the high‑pressure laboratory of the Research Institute of Applied Chemistry.

Up until 1936, he had held a senior chemist position and headed one of the institute’s sections. In addition, he had begun actively teaching, and starting in 1929, he read lectures at Leningrad State University and Leningrad State Institute of Technology on thermodynamics and physical chemistry. Frost obtained a Grand PhD in Chemistry from the state commission in 1936 without having to defend a doctoral dissertation, and in 1940 he was elevated to the rank of professor.

Frost had actively contributed to the advancement of petrochemical refining technology since 1936, when he headed a laboratory at the “Himgaz” facility in Leningrad. Additionally, he continued to work at the Fossil Fuel Institute of the Academy of Sciences of the Soviet Union. His activities at the time were primarily focused on designing industrial petrochemical installations and assisting the Soviet petrochemical industry in its growth, especially in the Azerbaijan Soviet Socialist Republic. He carried on with his scientific studies at the Institute of Petroleum and the Fossil Fuel Institute after moving to Moscow in 1941. He had served as the head of the Division of Kinetics and Catalysis at the Oil and Gas Research Institute of the Academy of Sciences and the Division of Physical Chemistry at Moscow State University since 1942.

From 1946 through 1947, he was a part‑time professor at Mendeleev University in the Division of Physical Chemistry.

== Scientific activity ==
Frost actively participated in phosphorus research in the late 1920s. He investigated the oxidation of phosphorus and its derivatives (such as phosphine and phosphonium salts) with water under various pressure and temperature conditions to create a contemporary technology for the industrial production of phosphoric acid. Later, his interests in science changed. Frost’s scientific interests are divided into two areas:

1. Development of a mathematical framework to investigate the kinetics of heterogeneously catalyzed flow processes. This has led to the Frost equation for first‑order reactions in an integral flow reactor and the Frost‑Dintses equation for catalytic processes complicated by self‑braking effects.
2. A theoretical justification for the formation of oil from organic substances containing oxygen and the variations in its chemical composition.

Frost focused on the physical thermodynamics of organic reactions when he started his initial research in the new field in 1930. The studies at the time focused on the chemical equilibrium of reactions, including the isomerization of higher aliphatic alkanes, as well as the hydration and dehydration of different alkenes and aromatic compounds. Furthermore, the capacity of olefins to inhibit the decomposition of aliphatic hydrocarbons was first observed and examined theoretically. According to Frost’s theoretical explanation, olefins are able to deactivate free radicals of saturated alkanes by forming stable complexes. That discovery was important for the oil industry, since unsaturated hydrocarbons are among the products of the cracking process. Frost used spectroscopic methods to measure the heats of hydration of ethylene, aliphatic olefins, and the formation of various saturated alcohols.

Frost conducted extensive research on palladium catalysts for the hydrogenation of benzene and toluene under various pressure conditions. That work established the reaction mechanism, which is the dissolution of hydrogen followed by a reaction with benzene molecules adsorbed on the surface. He actively investigated various nonmetallic catalysts, such as alumina, chromia, and silica, in addition to palladium, since his research was centered on figuring out the mechanism of more complex reactions on different mixed catalysts. Alongside A.V. Nikolaev, he worked on the sulfide catalyst‑based decyclization of cyclohexane.

Frost, A.F. Nikolaeva, and A.A. Minhovski conducted research on the catalytic properties of aluminosilicates and found that these catalysts have a unique characteristic: the disproportionation of aliphatic hydrocarbons. While metal catalysis is characterized by the irreversibility of hydrogen distribution within the molecule, the new type of catalyst allows for the production of high‑quality gasoline.

Several reviews and monographs on statistical and thermodynamic approaches to calculating chemical equilibria are among more than 150 published works.

== Teaching ==
He was involved in both scientific and teaching endeavors. He focused heavily on training aspiring researchers and giving students internships at chemical facilities while serving as the head of the Division of Physical Chemistry at Moscow State University. Frost’s greatest accomplishment is that he established the largest school of thought in physical chemistry in the Soviet Union. Among his pupils are Professor K.V. Topchieva, Academician of the Russian Academy of Sciences A.M. Gryaznov, and others.

== Final years ==
Frost was formulating a theory in his final years to explain the origin of oil, which enabled him to explain chemical composition differences between oil grades. That study had a significant impact on the oil refining industry as well as geological research. He died on August 4, 1952, while on a business trip in Baku, when he was 45 years old, and in the words of one obituary, at the peak of his creativity. He is interred in Section 15 of the Vagankovo Cemetery. He received medals including the Order of the Red Banner of Labor.

== Literature ==
- Герасимов Я. И. (1952). "Андрей Владимирович Фрост (некролог)" [Andrei Frost (Obituary)]. Успехи Химии (in Russian). 21 (10): 1272–1278.
- Фрост А. В. (1960). Избранные научные труды [Selected Scientific Works] (in Russian). М.: Изд-во Московского университета. p. 512.
