= Sejny Synagogue =

Former Orthodox synagogue in Sejny, Poland

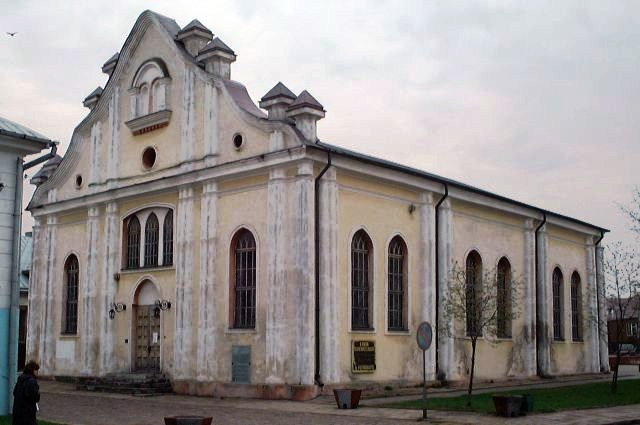
- The former synagogue in c. 2005

- Location of the former synagogue in Podlaskie Voivodeship

Religion
- Affiliation: Orthodox Judaism (former)
- Rite: Nusach Ashkenaz
- Ecclesiastical or organizational status: Synagogue (1885–1939); Profane use (1940–c. 1980s); Jewish museum (since 1987)
- Status: Abandoned; Repurposed

Location
- Location: 41 Piłsudskieo Street, Sejny, Podlaskie Voivodeship
- Country: Poland
- Interactive map of Sejny Synagogue
- Coordinates: 54°06′22″N 23°20′56″E

Architecture
- Type: Synagogue architecture
- Style: Baroque Revival
- Founder: Moses Becalel Luria
- Completed: 1885

Specifications
- Length: 25.5 m (84 ft)
- Width: 19 m (62 ft)
- Materials: Brick

The Sejny Synagogue, also called the White Synagogue in Sejny, is a former Orthodox Jewish congregation and synagogue, located at 41 Piłsudskiego Street, in Sejny, in the Podlaskie Voivodeship of Poland. Designed in the Baroque Revival style and completed in 1885, the former synagogue was desecrated by Nazis during World War II and has been used as a Jewish museum and cultural center since 1987.

== History ==
The large, Neo-Baroque style building on Pilsudskiego Street was erected in the 1860s, replacing an older building. It was used by the Nazis as a fire station, the interior was gutted and all furnishings were destroyed. In 1987 the building was restored with a plain, modern interior and now serves as a cultural center, theater, and museum.

Called the Borderland Foundation (Fundacja Pogranicze), the foundation and its cultural center are dedicated to the cultures of the region: Polish, Lithuanian, Belarusian, Jewish, Ukrainian and Russian. A Klezmer band is based at the cultural center. Located adjacent to the former synagogue, the nineteenth century yeshiva building also survives, and is also used by the Borderland Foundation.

== See also ==
- Chronology of Jewish Polish history
- History of the Jews in Poland
- List of active synagogues in Poland
