= Ilya Devin =

Mordvin writer (1922–1998)

Ilya Maksimovich Devin (Russian cyrillic: Илья́ Макси́мович Де́вин; July 20, 1922, Sire Теrizmorga – November 13, 1998, Saransk) was a Mordvin writer.

== Life ==
He was born in a family of farmers, and after being a soldier in the World War II with the Red Army, he worked in radio and press. He started writing when he was very young and he published several poetry books and the novel «Нардише» in 1969.

He was awarded with Order of the Red Banner of Labour, Order of the Red Star and Order of Friendship of Peoples.
