= Glafira Dorosh =

- Born: January 5, 1921
- Died: September 17, 2015 (aged 94)

Glafira Vasilyevna Dorosh (Ukrainian: Глафіра Василівна Дорош; Russian: Глафира Васильевна Дорош; 5 January 1921 – 17 September 2015) was a Ukrainian chef from the village of Ulanov, Vinnytsia Oblast, who invented Potato Ulanov. She is the only recipient of a Soviet Order for a culinary recipe.

Glafira Dorosh started to work at age 14. As her mother was a cook she found work in a local eatery as well. Later she graduated from a culinary school in Kiev. During World War II Ukraine was occupied by Nazi Germany, and Dorosh was sent to work in Germany in a weapons factory in Nuremberg. Sometimes the women obtained raw potatoes and tried to invent new ways to prepare them.

After the war she returned to Ukraine and worked in a restaurant in the village of Ulanov, Vinnytsia Oblast. There they made twenty different dishes out of potatoes. The Ulanov potatoes were invented accidentally from a batch of small leftover potatoes that restaurant management allowed the cooks to use for themselves (in 1947 food was precious). She fried the potatoes in leftover oil (from potatoes stuffed with meat) and put garlic sauce on them. The dish was considered tasty enough to include on the menu of the restaurant.

In the beginning of the 1960s kolkhoz "Druzhba" ("friendship"), in which Ulanov was included, the village was visited by a reporter of a popular Izvestia newspaper from Moscow. The administration of the kolkhoz was afraid of negative publicity, so as a form of a bribe they produced a feast in the Ulanov restaurant for the visiting correspondent. Among the many dishes served, the potato with garlic sauce stood out for the journalist. Soon, instead of the expected negative article, Izvestia published a lengthy article praising the "Ulanov potato" and its inventors. Soon the new recipe was widely reported throughout the Soviet print media and the recipe became popular through the Soviet Union. It was sold in many restaurants for the price of only six kopeks a portion (approximately 7 cents by the official exchange rate, significantly less by the black market rate); very inexpensive even by Soviet standards. On 11 November 1965 Glafira Dorosh was awarded the Order of the Red Banner of Labour. Dorosh was the only recipient of a Soviet Order for a culinary recipe.

Dorosh continued to live in Ukraine as a pensioner. In her latter years, it was reported that she still loved to cook potato dishes, though she did not prepare her "Ulanov potato" often. She died on 17 September 2015, at the age of 94.
