= Asher Baer =

Russian Jewish mathematician and engraver

- אשר בער
- Born: Early 19th century Seiny, Suwałki Region
- Died: 1897; Jerusalem, Ottoman Empire

Asher Baer (Hebrew: אשר בער; early 19th century, Seiny – 1897, Jerusalem) was a Russian Jewish mathematician and engraver.

He made many important discoveries in mathematics and especially in mechanics. He discovered a method by which the same force causes two different movements of two equal cog-wheels to dovetail with each other. His engravings were awarded a prize at the Königsberg Exhibition of 1858. The German press of that time devoted many articles to Baer's valuable inventions, and Ossip Rabbinovich and O. Wohl in the Russo-Jewish periodicals Razsvyet and Ha-Karmel spoke highly of his talent. In the later part of the 1860s Baer went to Jerusalem, whence he wrote correspondence for many years for Ha-Maggid and other Hebrew periodicals.
