= Takey Esetov =

Soviet Kazakh political figure

- Тәкей Есетов

First Secretary of the Kyzyl-Orda Regional Committee of the Communist Party of Kazakhstan
- In office December 1978 – 22 January 1985
- Preceded by: Isatai Abdikarimov
- Succeeded by: Erkin Auelbekov

First Secretary of the Aral District Committee of the Communist Party of Kazakhstan
- In office ?–?

Personal details
- Born: Takey Esetovich Esetov; 15 January 1923 Kazaly, Kazakh ASSR, Soviet Union
- Died: 30 October 2003 (aged 80) Kzyl-Orda, Kazakh SSR
- Political party: Communist
- Occupation: Economist

Takey Esetovich Esetov (Kazakh: Такей Есетович Есетов; 15 January 1923 – 30 October 2003) was a Soviet Kazakh politician who served as the First Secretary of the Kyzyl-Orda Regional Committee of the Communist Party of Kazakhstan from 1978 to 1985. He also held office as the First Secretary of the Aral District Committee of the Communist Party of Kazakhstan.

== Biography ==
Takey Esetov was born on 15 January 1923, in Kazaly, Kazakh ASSR.

He began his career as a teacher in literacy elimination courses. Before the war, he worked as a secretary of the people's court. He attended a six-month aviation course at the Alma-Ata School (1941) and graduated from the Leningrad Financial-Economic Institute in 1955.

In 1941–1942, he served on the front. Due to severe injuries, he was demobilized and returned to his homeland. He was the secretary in the district court and served in the State Security Committee. From 1950, he worked in the district financial department and became the head of the financial department of the Aral District in 1955. From 1957 to 1985, he held various positions: the Second Secretary of the Aral District Committee, head of the department in the Kyzylorda Regional Committee, the First Secretary of the Aral District Committee, and ultimately served as the First Secretary of the Kyzyl-Orda Regional Committee. He was repeatedly elected as a deputy of the Supreme Soviet of the Kazakh SSR and the Supreme Soviet of the Soviet Union.

Esetov retired at the age of 62. Esetov died on the morning of 30 October 2003.

== Legacy ==
In 2023, the government of Kazakhstan announced plans to celebrate the 100th anniversary of his birthday. Before the start of the conference, a ceremony was held to plant flowers at the monument of the entrepreneur in front of the school-lyceum No. 264 named after Takey Esetov.

== Awards ==
Order of the Red Banner of Labour, three times
Order of the October Revolution
Order of the Patriotic War of the 2nd degree
Order of the Badge of Honour
Medal "For Courage" (Russia)
Jubilee Medal "In Commemoration of the 100th Anniversary of the Birth of Vladimir Ilyich Lenin"
Medal "For the Victory over Germany in the Great Patriotic War 1941–1945"
Jubilee Medal "Twenty Years of Victory in the Great Patriotic War 1941–1945"
Jubilee Medal "Forty Years of Victory in the Great Patriotic War 1941–1945"
Jubilee Medal "50 Years of Victory in the Great Patriotic War 1941–1945"
Jubilee Medal "50 Years of the Armed Forces of the USSR"
Jubilee Medal "60 Years of the Armed Forces of the USSR"
Jubilee Medal "70 Years of the Armed Forces of the USSR"
Medal "25 Years of Victory in the Great Patriotic War"
