= Sejny =

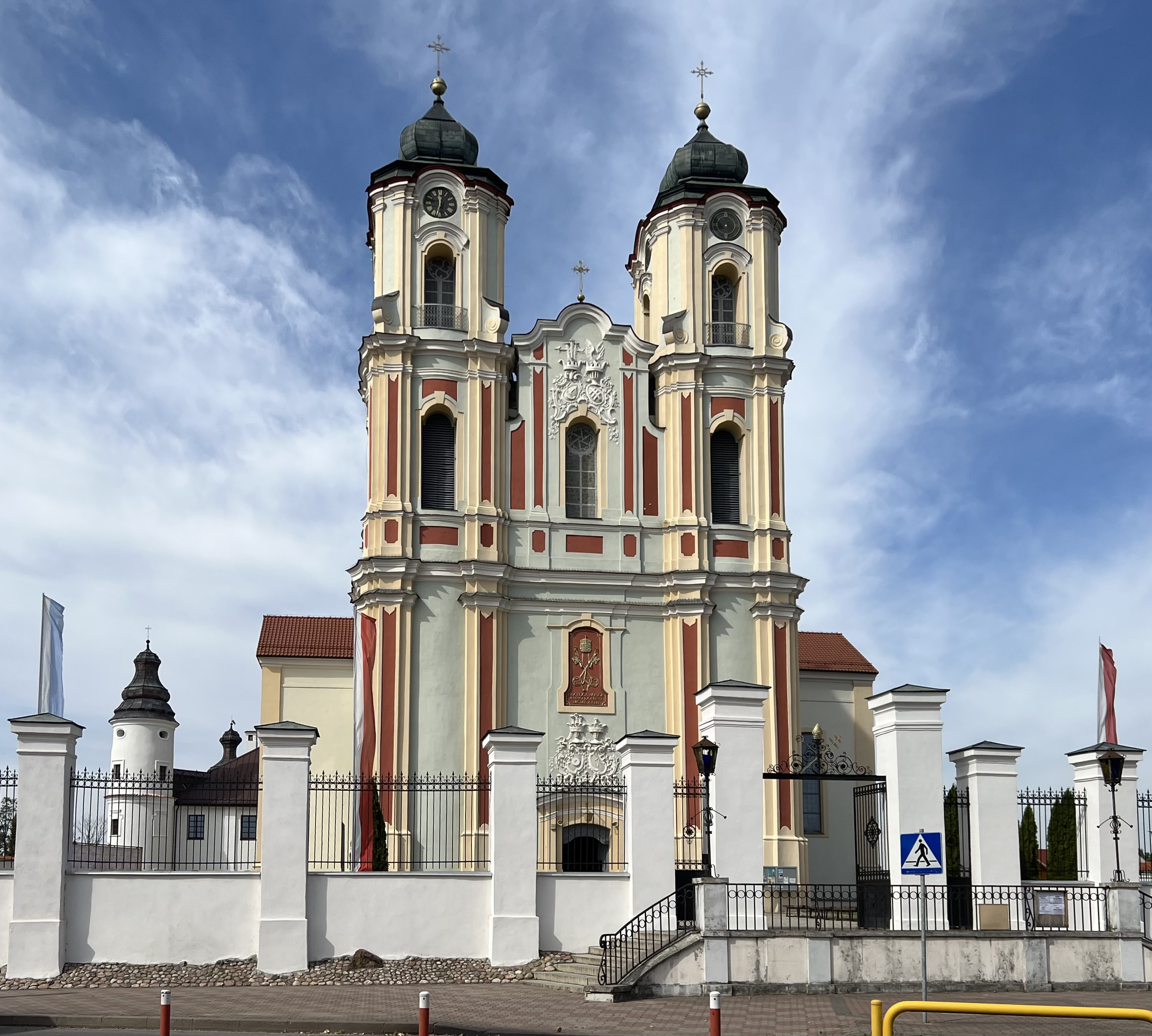
- Baroque Basilica of the Visitation in Sejny

- Flag Coat of arms

- Location within Podlaskie Voivodeship Location within Poland
- Coordinates: 54°7′N 23°22′E
- Country: Poland
- Voivodeship: Podlaskie Voivodeship
- County: Sejny County
- Gmina: Sejny (urban gmina)
- Established: 16th century
- Town rights: ~1600

Government
  - Mayor: Arkadiusz Nowalski

Area
  - Total: 4.49 km^{2} (1.73 sq mi)

Population (2022)
  - Total: 5,024
  - Density: 1,120/km^{2} (2,900/sq mi)
- Time zone: UTC+1 (CET)
  - Summer (DST): UTC+2 (CEST)
- Postal code: 16–500
- Car plates: BSE
- Website: www.sejny.home.pl

Sejny ([ˈsɛi̯nɨ]; Lithuanian: Seinai) is a town in north-eastern Poland and the capital of Sejny County, in Podlaskie Voivodeship, close to the border with Lithuania and Belarus. It is located in the eastern part of the Suwałki Lake Area (Polish: Pojezierze Suwalskie), on the Marycha river (Seina in Lithuanian for which the town was named), being a tributary of the Czarna Hańcza. As of 1999 it had almost 6,500 permanent inhabitants, with a strong seasonal increase during the tourist season.

== Etymology ==
According to a legend, the town of Sejny was started by three of the old knights of the King of Poland and Grand Duke of Lithuania Władysław II Jagiełło, who after the Battle of Grunwald granted them a land parcel in what is now Sejny. The three were very old and named the settlement Seni, which is a Lithuanian word for Old Men. The name was purportedly given to the city of Sejny. However, no archaeological findings or documents support this legend.

The name is Yotvingian in origin. The linguist Jerzy Nalepa has proposed that the nearby river named Sejna (now Marycha) and the city name are Yotvingian. This conclusion is based on two features:

1. the presence of West Baltic "s" (vs. modern Lith. "š")
2. retention of the diphthong "ei".

Cognates include Pol. siano and Lith. šienas, both meaning "hay".

== History ==
Historical affiliations of the town (including occupations during world wars)

Grand Duchy of Lithuania 1520s–1569
GDL, part of PLC 1569–1795
Kingdom of Prussia 1795–1807
Duchy of Warsaw 1807–1815
Congress Poland 1815–1867
Vistula Land 1867–1915
Ober Ost 1915–1919
Republic of Lithuania 1919 May 8 – 1919 Aug. 22
Second Polish Republic 1919 Aug. – 1920 July
Lithuania 1920 July 19 – Aug. 31
Poland Aug. 31 – Sept. 1
Lithuania Sept. 2 – Sept. 9
Poland 1920 Sept. 10 – 1939 Sept. 24
Soviet Union 1939 Sept. 24 – Oct. 13
Nazi Germany 1939 Oct. – 1944 Aug. 31
Polish People's Republic 1944–1989
Poland 1989–

=== Middle Ages ===
In the early Middle Ages the area comprising modern Sejny was inhabited by the Yotvingians, one of the Baltic tribes closely related to Lithuanians that had arrived in the area in the first millennium. There was ongoing strife for the area since the 13th century between the Teutonic Order and Lithuania. This resulted in the area being almost completely depopulated, with only a few of the indigenous Yotvingians surviving. The first written record of the area where the town now lies dates to 1385, noting an armed raid of the German knights from Castrum Leicze (Giżycko) to Merkinė.

After the Treaty of Melno in 1422, Teutonic-Lithuanian border was determined, people began to return to the forests in the area. The territory formed part of the Grand Duchy of Lithuania within the Polish–Lithuanian union under the Jagiellonian dynasty, since 1569 transformed into the Polish–Lithuanian Commonwealth. New roads were paved, with one of them, the road leading from Berżniki (Beržininkai) through Sejny to Merkinė, becoming a notable trade route.

=== Early modern era ===
==== 16th century ====
In 1510 Michał Pac became the governor of the area, founding the settlement of Beržininkai (Polish: Berżniki). This started a period of the rapid development of the former Yotvingian lands. On December 22, 1522, Sigismund I the Old ordered the voivode of Podlaskie Janusz Kostewicz to grant 1.5 km^{2} (1/2 sq mi) of land at the shores of the river Sejna (now called Marycha) to hetman Iwan Wiśniowiecki. On May 21 of the following year, Kostewicz described the parcel in a letter to the king and soon afterwards Wiśniowiecki became the owner of the area. A new wooden manor was built in the place where the Sejna river reached Sejny lake and soon settlement started. Wiśniowiecki, a mighty magnate from Volhynia, never came there personally and instead appointed his governor to rule the hamlet.

In 1593 the town was sold by his great-granddaughter Anna, wife of voivode of Witebsk Mikołaj Sapieha, to a local noble Jerzy Grodziński for sixty times the amount of 10.000 grosz in silver. Until 1602 he transferred the unnamed village (sometimes referred to as Sejna) into a town called Juriewo, after its founder. However, the name did not stick and instead it was named Sejny.

The town's market was located on a small hill overlooking the right bank of the river, near the original wooden manor. It was located right on the earlier trade route. South of the town, a new road leading to Grodno was created and the new settlement received significant income from trading. The founder of the town financed a Catholic St George's church and established a new parochy.

==== 17th century ====
Jerzy Grodziński died without heirs. On May 16, 1602, he had bequeathed all of his properties to the Dominican monastery in Vilnius. He died on 12 January 1603 and on 4 June 1603 king Sigismund III Vasa accepted the testament. In 1610 the monks started the construction of a large monastery there. The construction of the monastery was finished in 1619 and by 1632 a new church was built nearby, devoted to Holy Mary, Saint George and Saint Hyacinth. The town developed slowly, mostly due to low traffic on the old trade routes to Grodno. In the 17th century, another church was built, consecrated to the Holy Spirit. A printing press was started and most probably a hospital. The monastery was being constantly expanded, becoming one of the most notable examples of a fortified monastery in Central Europe.

War with Swedish Empire, known as The Deluge, was disastrous for the town. In 1656, after a major battle took place nearby, the town was captured by the Swedes, looted and burnt to the ground. The monastery survived and after the war ended, the monks returned to the town and started its reconstruction. On November 8, 1670, the king Michael I granted the town the privilege of organizing a market and fair once a week. This helped the monks to repopulate the town with new Polish settlers, mostly from over-populated Masovia.

==== 18th century ====
In the early 18th century the Great Northern War put an end to the prosperity, as the town was pillaged by several armies in a row. The soldiers also carried two consecutive plagues to the town.

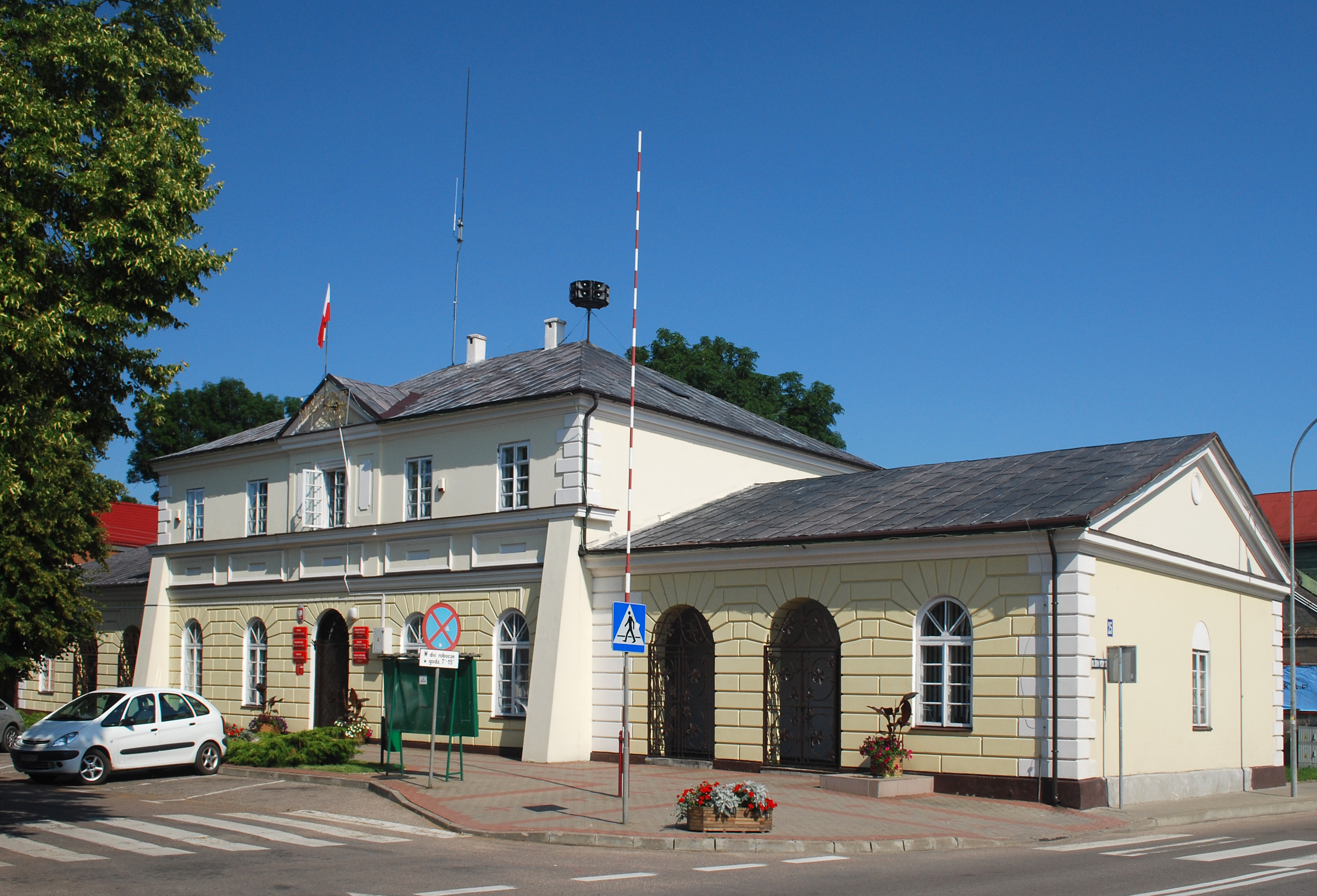
Sejny town hall

At the same time, the area was being populated, and numerous settlements were founded not far from Sejny. In 1715 the Camedulian monks founded a village and a monastery, which developed into what is now the town of Suwałki. Other towns founded in that period were Puńsk, Augustów, Jeleniewo and Krasnopol. With increased prosperity in the town, the Dominicans started the reconstruction of Sejny, leading to the construction of notable examples of baroque architecture. The church received a new façade, in 1770 a new town hall was built, and in 1778 a new marketplace and a new Wooden synagogue were opened.

=== 19th century ===
During the Third Partition of Poland, Sejny was annexed by the Kingdom of Prussia in 1795 and was made part of the newly established province of New East Prussia. Initially neglected, in 1807 the town became part of the short-lived Polish Duchy of Warsaw and a major administrative centre within the Łomża Department. After the defeat of Napoleon Bonaparte in 1815, the town became part of newly formed Congress Poland in the Russian Partition of Poland, retaining its status as a seat of a powiat within the Augustów Voivodeship. In 1818 the bishopric was moved to Sejny from Wigry and Sejny Priest Seminary was established in 1826. The town continued to prosper, despite a major fire that had struck the city earlier that year. The population also grew rapidly. Prosperity declined in the latter part of the 19th century.

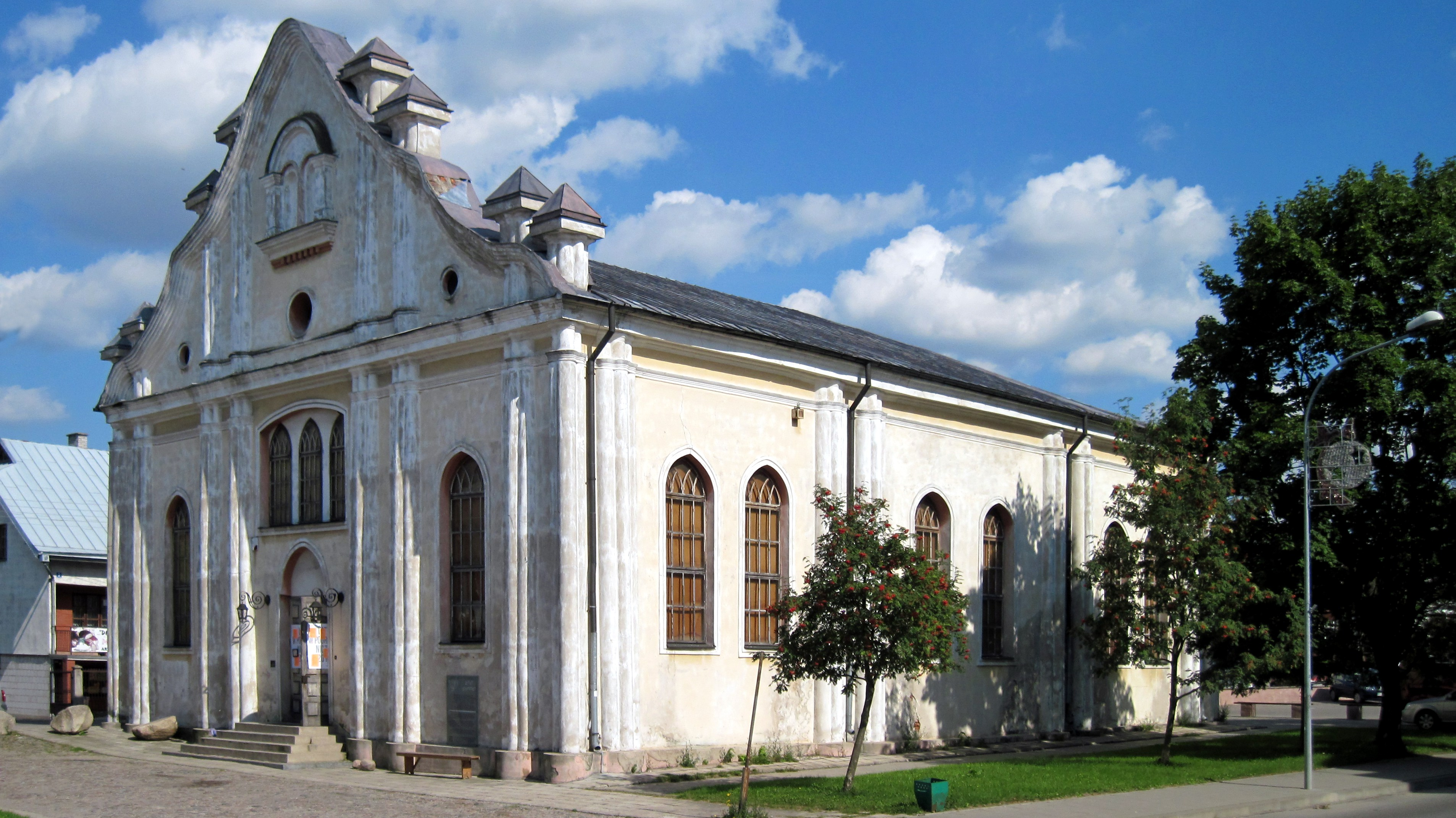
Sejny Synagogue, known as the White synagogue

==== Uprisings ====
During the November Uprising and the January Uprising the town's inhabitants took part in the struggles against Imperial Russia. After the massacres of Polish protesters committed by the Russians in Warsaw in 1861, Polish processions and clashes with Russian soldiers took place in Sejny. The Sejny County was one of the counties in which the insurgent unit of Józef Konstanty Ramotowski operated during the January Uprising in 1863. Sejny was one of the sites of Russian executions of Polish insurgents during the January Uprising. There is a memorial at the place of the executions.

After the uprisings the town was deprived of its privileges and neglected by Russia. The lack of railway development by the Russian Empire prevented the town from developing industry. Sejny continued as a small provincial town and a local centre of trade and commerce. Nonetheless, the Neo-baroque Sejny Synagogue was built in the 1860s, now used as a cultural center after the deportation and murder of the Jews by Nazi Germany in the Holocaust during World War II.

=== World War I ===
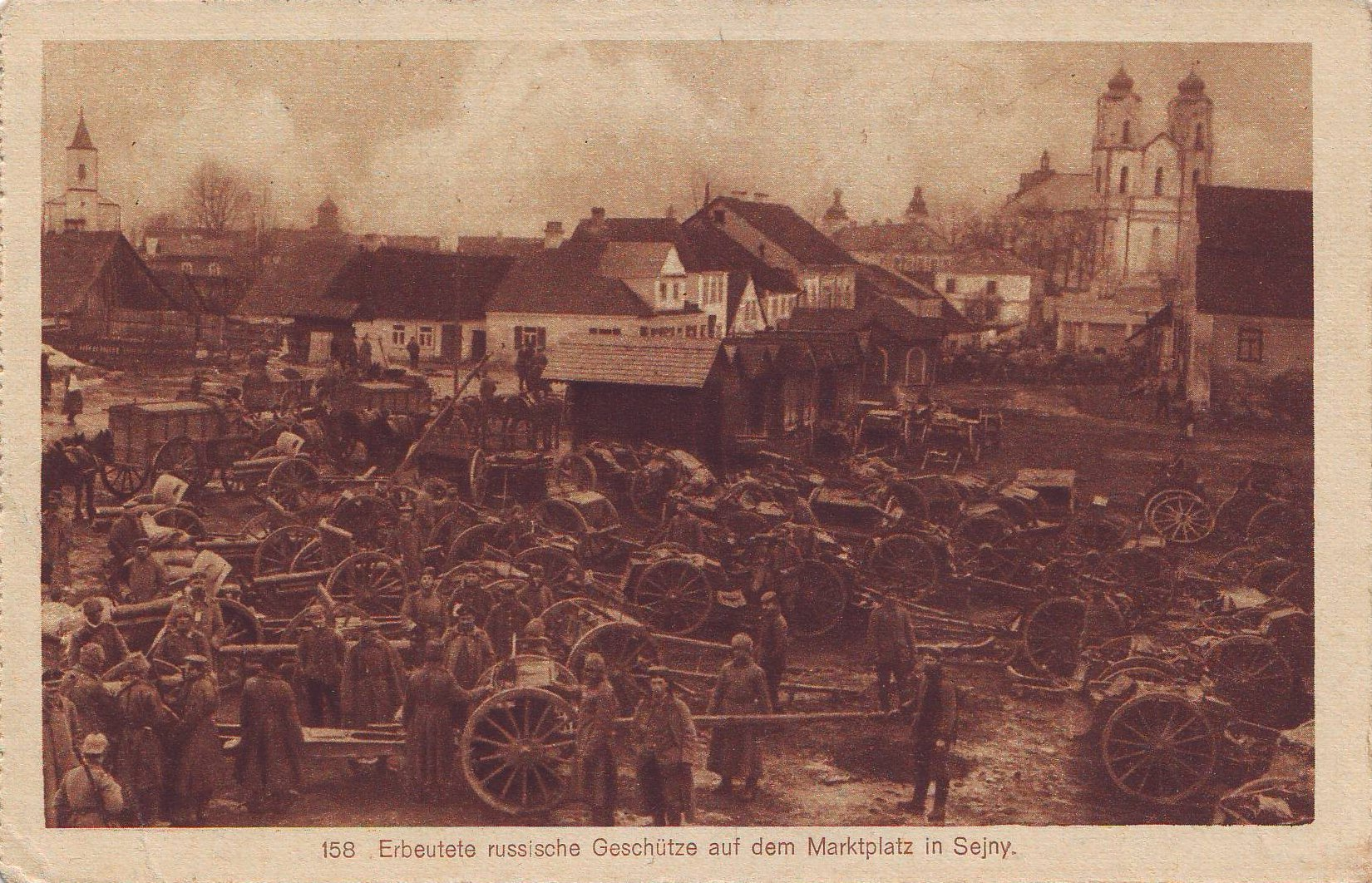
Sejny under German occupation during World War I

During World War I, in 1915 the town was captured and then occupied by Germany. Initially their forces made it part of the Ober Ost military administration, but Germany planned this area to be one of the puppet states in Central Europe in accordance with their Mitteleuropa plan. Following Germany's defeat in the war, the German garrisons started to withdraw from the area.

=== Interbellum ===
On May 8, 1919 Germany handed over the administration to Lithuania which recently declared its independence. This led to tensions between Lithuania and Poland (which also declared independence around the same time), as both claimed the area. Under pressure from the Conference of Ambassadors (later to become the League of Nations), Poland initially backed down on the issue, but, on August 22, 1919, on the day German troops withdrew from the area, Polish Military Organization organized a military action against the Lithuanian rule in what became known as the Sejny Uprising (or "Seinai Revolt"). Sejny changed hands several times. During these battles, both sides used repressive measures - the Lithuanians had deported a lot of Polish families, while the Polish had closed all Lithuanian schools. On August 28, the uprising ended with a Polish success, and the town became a part of Poland. After Poles acquired the town and its surroundings, the Lithuanian population of the region was subject to various repressions, which included evictions; banning the use of Lithuanian language in public; closures of Lithuanian organizations, schools and press; and confiscation of property. The Polish historian Piotr Łossowski has suggested that both sides exaggerated repressions they suffered during the uprising and its aftermath in order to elicit internal and external support. Sejny town at the time had approximately 2500 inhabitants.

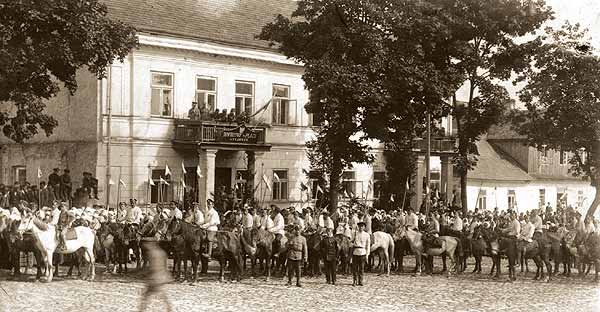
Polish cavalry parade in Sejny in the interbellum

Only a year later, the town was captured by the Soviet Russia in the course of the Polish–Soviet War. To ensure the right of passage through Lithuanian territory, on 12 July 1920 the Soviet authorities signed the Soviet-Lithuanian Treaty of 1920, in which it ceded the area to Lithuania. On July 19 the Lithuanians recaptured the town. Then the Lithuanians closed Polish schools and offices, and began harassing Poles. After the Battle of Warsaw the Bolshevik forces were defeated and the Polish Army attacked the Lithuanian forces. As the Paris Peace Conference established the Polish-Lithuanian border roughly correspondent to the status quo ante bellum, the Lithuanian forces were forced to withdraw from the town and on 31 August 1920 the town once again passed to Polish hands. However, the Lithuanian authorities still claimed the area and Lithuanian successfully counterattacked on September 2. However, the Polish Army recaptured the town on September 9. The following day the last of the Lithuanian units retreated to the other side of the border and on October 7 a cease fire agreement was signed, leaving Sejny on the Polish side of the border, so Sejny and the vicinity became part of reborn Polish state. In the interbellum, the town was still desired by Lithuania.

In 1925 the bishopric and the powiat status were removed, but the town remained a notable centre of not only trade and commerce but also wood and furniture production, gaining profits from the nearby forests. In 1925, Sejny became part of the Suwałki County (powiat) and it was only in 1956 that the Sejny County (powiat) was restored (during the Polish People's Republic).

The 1930s saw the development of the town and the construction of new residential buildings and workplaces. Sejny was part of Poland "B", that is, it was located in a poorer part of Poland.

=== World War II ===
During the invasion of Poland, which started World War II, in 1939 the town was first captured by the Soviet Union on September 24, 1939. Sejny was severely pillaged and then on 13 October 1939 transferred to Nazi Germany. It remained occupied by the Germans until August 1944.

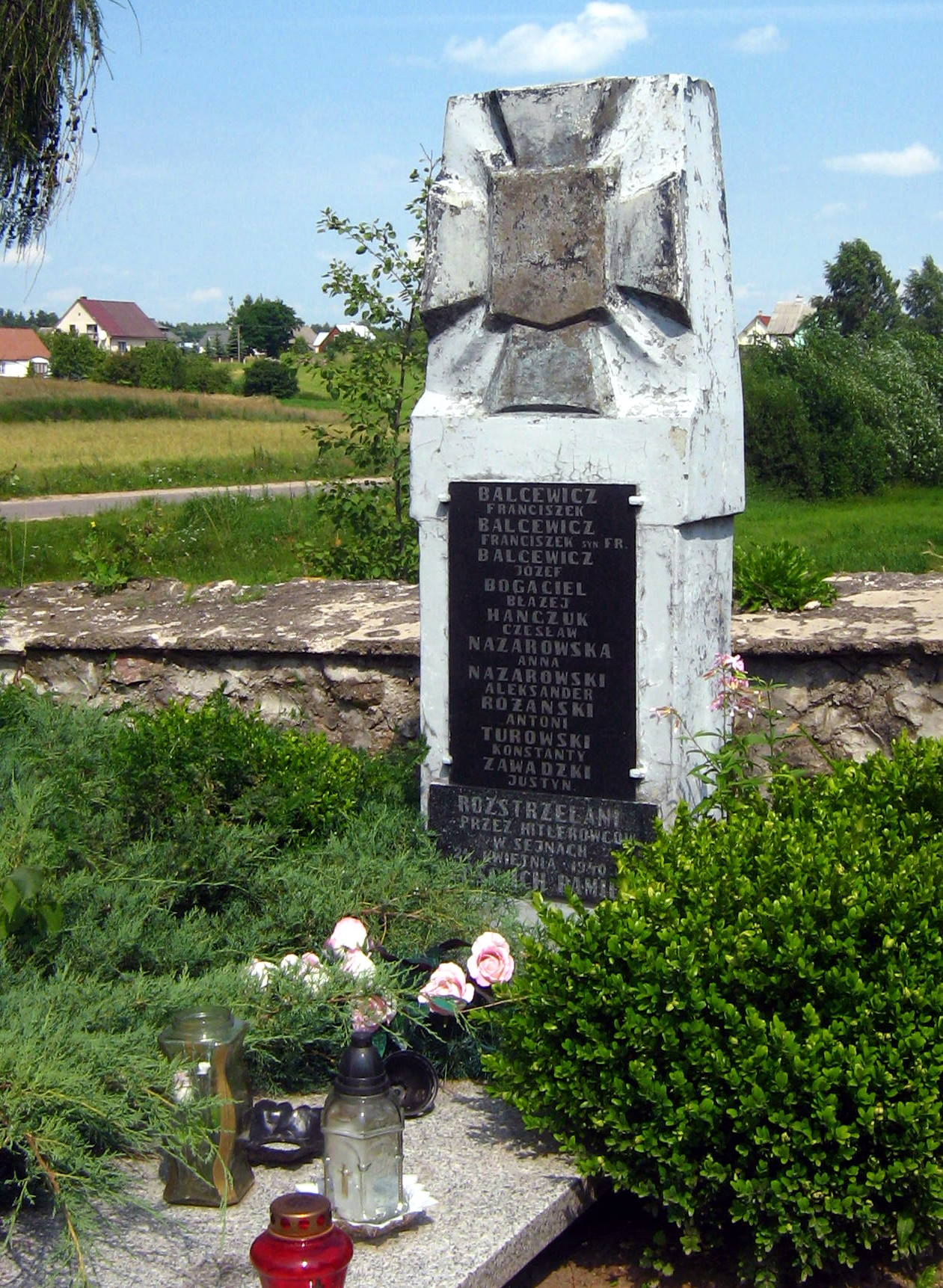
Mass grave of Poles murdered by the Germans on April 24, 1940

Poles were subjected to mass arrests, executions and deportations to Nazi concentration camps, and the local Jewish community was almost completely destroyed. The Germans carried out a massacre of 10 Poles at the local cemetery in 1939. The Germans closed down both Polish and Lithuanian schools and then looted and destroyed school libraries. Poles managed to organize secret teaching, but soon the Germans carried out mass arrests of Polish teachers, who were then imprisoned in a Gestapo jail in Suwałki. Nevertheless, secret Polish education continued until the end of the occupation. In April 1940 the Germans carried out mass arrests of 150 Poles, 10 of whom were publicly executed at the market square on April 24, 1940, and the wójt of Gmina Sejny was murdered in Prudziszki on April 26, 1940. Several Polish priests were arrested and deported to the Sachsenhausen, Soldau and Dachau concentration camps, where most of them died. Two priests survived the concentration camps and the war: one, who also held American citizenship, eventually settled in the United States, where he received medical treatment in the following years, and the other returned to Poland after surviving Nazi human experimentation in Dachau. Poles were expelled from church properties, which were then handed over to Germans as part of the Lebensraum policy. Works of art and vital records were robbed by the Germans from the local church and taken to Königsberg.

On 31 July 1944 the town was captured a first time by the Red Army, then a second time on 18 August 1944. Soon afterwards, it was delivered to the new Soviet-controlled communist authorities of Poland.

=== Recent period and modern Sejny ===
After the war, the local population, largely depleted during the war, started to recuperate. A notable influx of Poles resettled from the Polish areas annexed by the Soviet Union allowed for fast reconstruction of the town. In 1956, after the administrative reform of that year, Sejny once again became a seat of a powiat. Although it was cancelled in 1975, the new administrative division of Poland passed in 1999 reinstituted it. Depopulation may ultimately again threaten the present local and regional administrative organisation.

In 1980, Lithuanian priests, including priest Pranas Gavėnas, visited Sejny and were forbidden to celebrate Mass in Lithuanian in the Sejny Basilica. The priests wrote a letter of protest to the Pope John Paul II that the Polish Lithuanians could not pray in Lithuanian. From 16 October 1983, Lithuanian-language services in the Sejny Basilica of the Virgin Mary began to be held.

Currently, Sejny is a notable centre of trade, production and tourism, with thousands of tourists visiting the town every year. A dairy and a cheese factory are located in the town, as well as numerous hotels.

Sejny is also a notable centre of the cultural life of the Lithuanian minority in Poland. It is the main seat of the Lithuanian Society of Poland and the Aušra bi-weekly. Lithuanians constituted 7.9% (474) of the city's inhabitants in 2002 and 20.2% (4,271) of the population in the Sejny County (powiat) in 2011. Due to that, there is a Lithuanian consulate there, as well as a Lithuanian schooling complex (kindergarten, elementary school, gymnasium).

Owing to a lost dispute about payment for the town's sewage treatment works, the town is financially crippled by debt. Mayor Arkadiusz Nowalski is fighting to rescue the town, which lacks sufficient collateral for necessary investment or to seek European development funding. Although mayor, with his 2014 shock win against the incumbent, he does not have the majority support of the council.

== Demographics ==
2002 – 6,010 inhabitants, by nationality:

- Poles – 90.9% (5,466);
- Lithuanians – 7.9% (474);
- Russians – 0.2% (12);
- Other – 1.0% (58).

1921 – 2,254 inhabitants, by nationality:

- Poles – 76.0% (1,714);
- Jews – 17.7% (399);
- Lithuanians – 5.0% (112);
- Russians – 0.7% (15);
- Germans – 0.5% (12);
- Belarusians – 0.1% (2).

1897 – 3,778 inhabitants, by language:

- Jewish – 50.8% (1,918);
- Polish – 40.4% (1,528);
- Lithuanian – 4.2% (160);
- Russian – 2.5% (95);
- German – 2.0% (75);
- Belarusian – 1;
- Tatar – 1.

== Notable tourist attractions ==
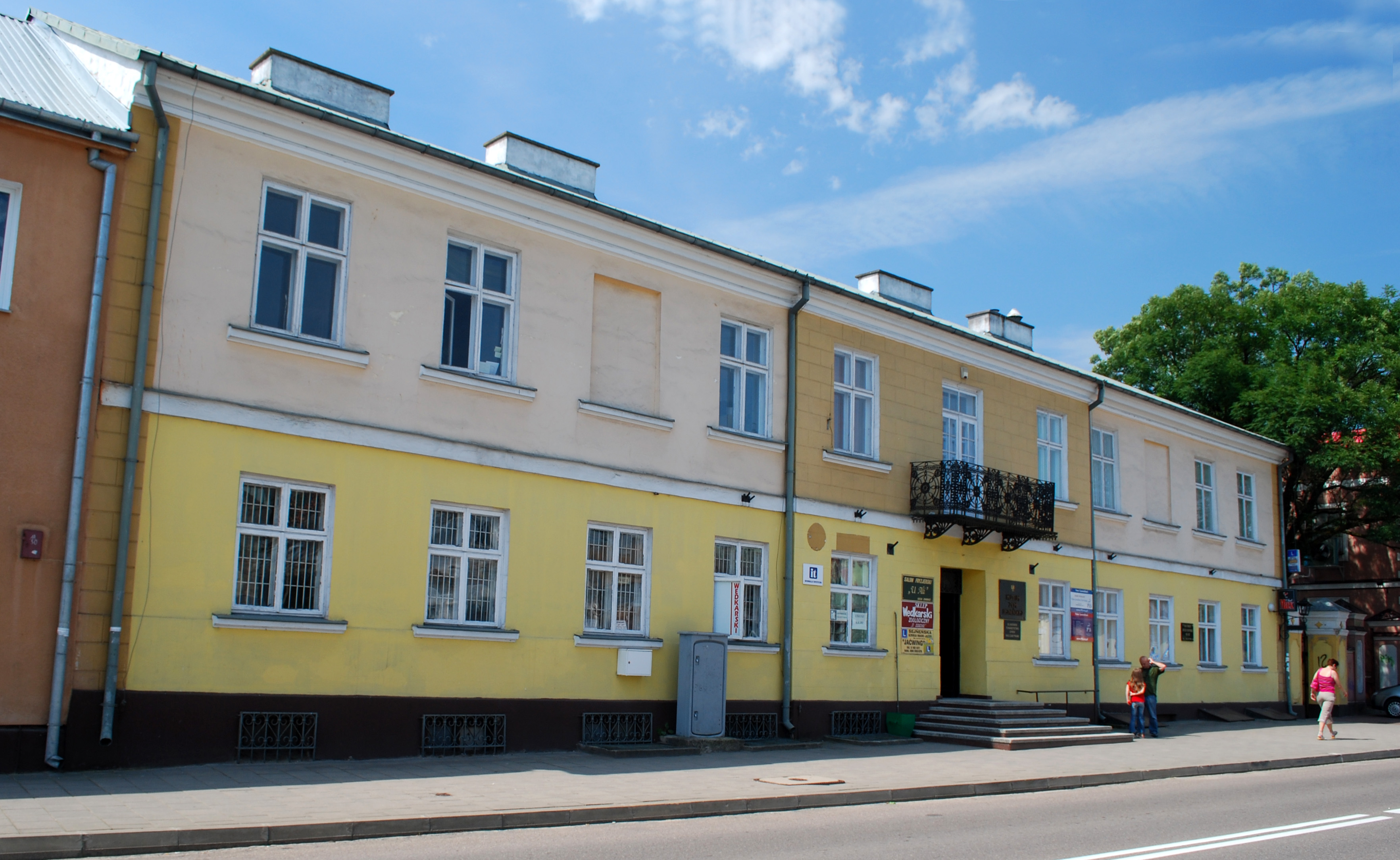
Local museum

- Dominican monastery (17th century)
- Assumption of the Holy Mary Church
- Notable sculpture of Our Lady of Sejny
- Museum, located in the former Episcopal Palace
- Town Hall (1770)
- three synagogues: White Synagogue, Old Synagogue, Talmudic House
- Monument to the Sejny Uprising
- Monument to Antanas Baranauskas

== Sports ==
The local football club is Pomorzanka Sejny. It competes in the lower leagues.

== Notable people ==
- Asher Baer (18??-1897), Russian-Jewish mathematician
- Antanas Baranauskas (1835-1902), Lithuanian poet, Roman Catholic bishop
- Krzysztof Buchowski (born 1969), Polish historian
- Haim Fishel Epstein (1874–1942), Lithuanian-American rabbi
- Ona Dokalskaitė-Paškevičienė (1912-2007), Lithuanian-American painter
- Vytautas Kairiūkštis (1890-1961), Lithuanian artist
- Szymon Konarski (1808-1839), Polish politician, spent his childhood here
- Piotr Markiewicz (born 1973), Polish sprint canoeist, Olympic bronze medallist

== Twin towns ==
Sejny is twinned with:

- Anykščiai, Lithuania
