= Order of the Red Banner of Labour =

Award of the Soviet Union

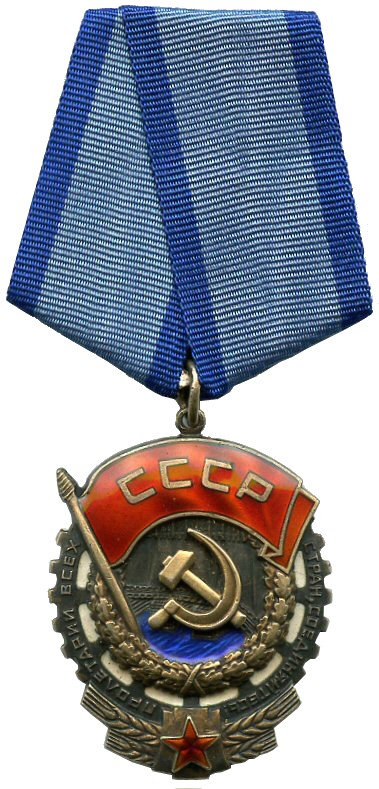
- Order of the Red Banner of Labour (obverse), type 2 post 1943
- Type: Single-grade order
- Awarded for: Accomplishments in labour, the civil service, literature, the arts and sciences
- Presented by: Soviet Union
- Eligibility: Soviet and foreign citizens. Institutions including factories
- Status: No longer awarded
- Established: December 28, 1920
- First award: June 28, 1921
- Final award: December 21, 1991

Highlights
- Total: 1,224,590
- Ribbon of the Order of the Red Banner of Labour
- Related: Order of the Red Banner

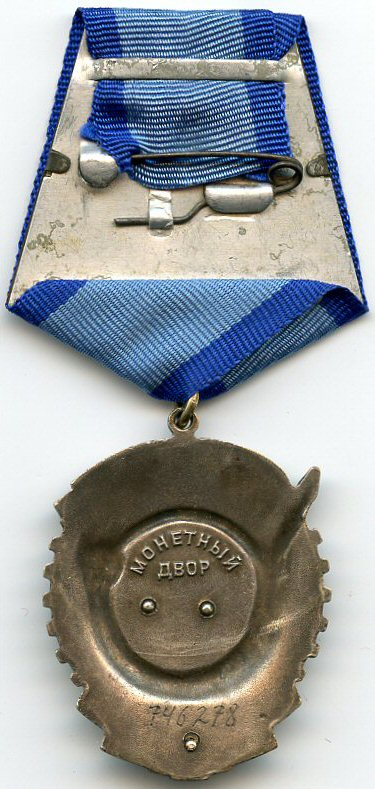
Reverse of a post 1943 type 2 Order of the Red Banner of Labour

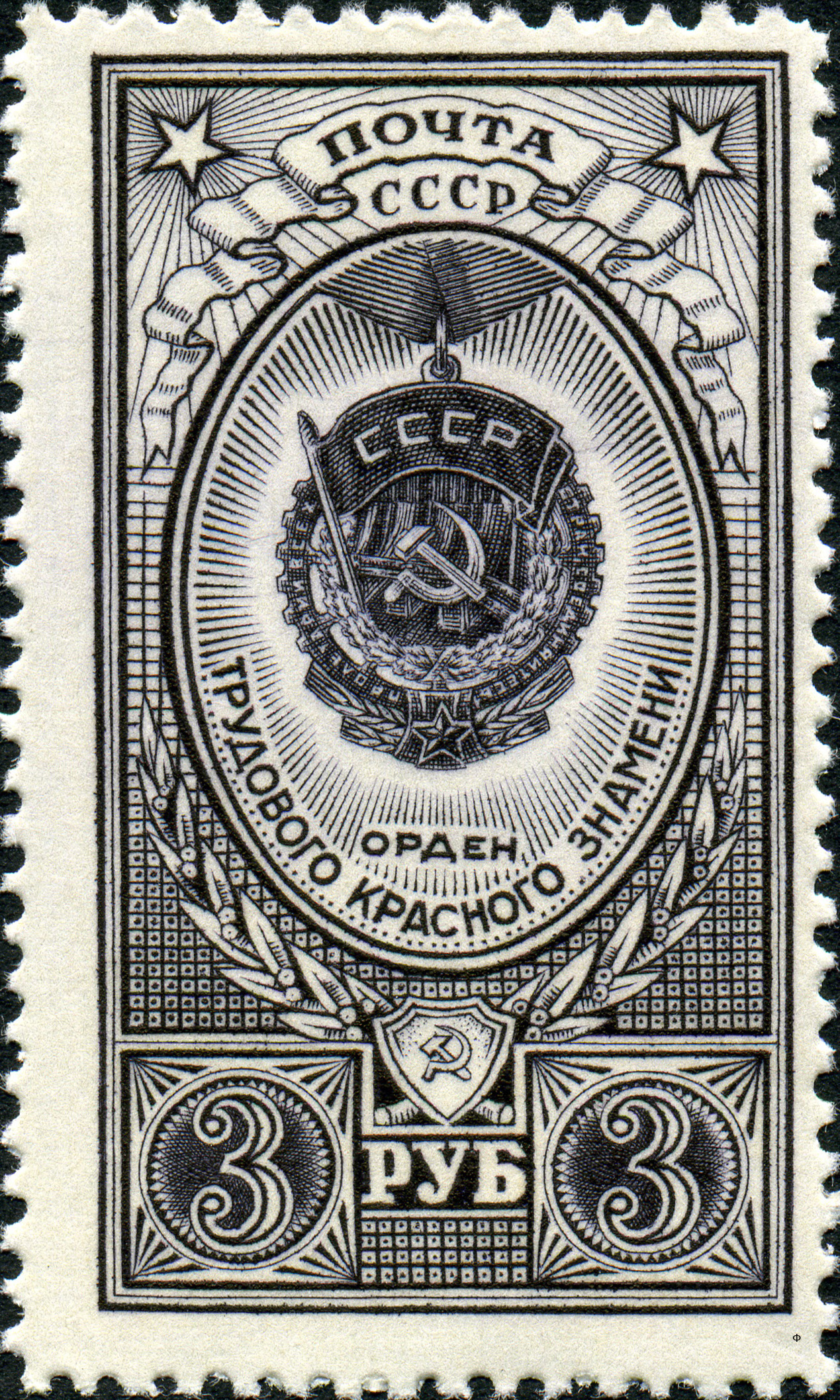
Order of the Red Banner of Labour depicted on a 1951 stamp

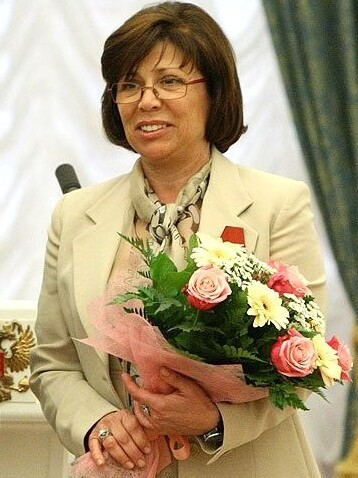
Olympic gold medalist figure skater Irina Rodnina, twice recipient of the Order of the Red Banner of Labour

The Order of the Red Banner of Labour (Russian: Орден Трудового Красного Знамени, romanised: Orden Trudovogo Krasnogo Znameni) was an order of the Soviet Union established to honour great deeds and services to the Soviet state and society in the fields of production, science, culture, literature, the arts, education, sports, health, social and other spheres of labour activities. It is the labour counterpart of the military Order of the Red Banner. A few institutions and factories, being the pride of Soviet Union, also received the order. The Order of the Red Banner of Labour was the third-highest civil award in the Soviet Union, after the Order of Lenin and the Order of the October Revolution.

The Order of the Red Banner of Labour began solely as an award of the Russian SFSR on December 28, 1920. The all-Union equivalent was established by Decree of the Presidium of the Supreme Soviet on September 7, 1928, and approved by another decree on September 15, 1928. The Order's statute and regulations were modified by multiple successive decrees of the Presidium of the Supreme Soviet of the USSR, on May 7, 1936, on June 19, 1943, on March 28, 1980, and on July 18, 1980.

== Award statute ==
The Order of the Red Banner of Labour can be awarded to citizens of the USSR, to businesses, associations, institutions, organisations, and allied autonomous republics, territories, autonomous regions, districts, cities and other localities; it may not be awarded to persons who are not citizens of the USSR, as well as to enterprises, institutions and organisations located in foreign countries:

- for great achievements in the development of industry, agriculture, farming, construction, transport and other sectors of the economy, to improve the efficiency of social production;
- for the highest growth rates in labour productivity, improved product quality, development and introduction of more advanced manufacturing processes;
- for consistently high results in the implementation and overfulfillment of planned assignments and socialist obligations undertaken;
- for major advances in increasing the productivity of agricultural crops and the productivity of livestock breeding, increasing manufacturing output and sales of state agricultural products;
- for contributions in the development of science and technology, the introduction of the latest achievements in the national economy, for inventions and innovations which are of great technical – economic significance;
- for contributions in strengthening national defence;
- for very fruitful activities in Soviet culture, literature and the arts;
- for contributions in education and communist political education to the younger generations, in highly specialised training, health, trade, catering, housing, utilities, housing, public services;
- for special achievements in the development of physical culture and Sports;
- for important achievements in the field of state and public activities, the strengthening of socialist legality and the rule of law;
- for great achievements in economic, scientific, technical and cultural cooperation between the USSR and other states.

The Order of the Red Banner of Labour could be awarded multiple times to the same recipient for successive deeds and long time merit.

The Order of the Red Banner of Labour was worn on the left side of the chest and in the presence of other awards of the USSR, was located immediately after the Order of the Red Banner. If worn in the presence of Orders or medals of the Russian Federation, the latter have precedence.

== Award description ==
The design of the Order of the Red Banner of Labour evolved over the years. Its original design, called "type 1" was amended in 1936, this new variant will be identified as "type 2".

=== Type 1 ===
The "type 1" Order consisted of a 38 mm wide by 43 mm high silver badge in the shape of a cogwheel, at centre, a disc bordered along its entire outer diameter by panicles of wheat. Protruding from under the lower half of the central disc, a red enamelled triangle pointing downwards. On the central disc in the background, a hydro electric dam, at centre, a gilded hammer and sickle, at the top, a waving red banner bearing the inscription "Proletarians of the World, unite!" (Russian: "Пролетарии всех стран, соединяйтесь!"). At the very bottom of the cogwheel, the relief inscription "USSR" (Russian: "СССР") on a stylised horizontal shield bisected by a smaller cogwheel meshing into the larger one. On the otherwise plain reverse, a recess at centre bearing a threaded post, two rivets used to secure the hammer and sickle and the award serial number engraved on the lower portion opposite the "USSR" inscription. The Order was secured to clothing with a threaded screw and nut arrangement. The earlier nuts were 28 mm in diameter, later ones measured 32 mm.

=== Type 2 ===
The "type 2" Order also consisted of a silver badge in the shape of a cogwheel, it measured 38 mm wide by 44 mm high. On the lower circumference of the cogwheel, the relief inscription "Proletarians of the World, unite!" (Russian: "Пролетарии всех стран, соединяйтесь!"), below the cogwheel, a red enamelled relief five pointed star superimposed on a shield from which four short panicles of wheat protrude left and right. At the centre, a disc surrounded by a gilded wreath of oak leaves bearing the relief image of a hydro electric dam, below the dam, blue enamelled water, at the centre of the disc, the gilded hammer and sickle, from the inner left side of the disc, a gilded mast bearing a waving red enamelled banner protruding from the central disc, covering the upper portion of the cogwheel and protruding past its outer upper edge on which "USSR" (Russian: "СССР") is inscribed in gilded letters. Along the outer circumference of the central disc's wreath, white enamelled slots spaced equally on the cogwheel. On the otherwise plain reverse, a concave recess at centre bearing a threaded post, eight rivets (only three rivets on the post 1943 variant) used to secure the various parts to the badge and the award serial number engraved on the lower portion below the recess. The Order was secured to clothing with a threaded screw and a 33 mm in diameter nut until 1943 when it was secured by a ring through the medal suspension loop to a pentagonal mount covered by an overlapping 24 mm wide light blue silk moiré ribbon with 4 mm wide dark blue edge stripes.

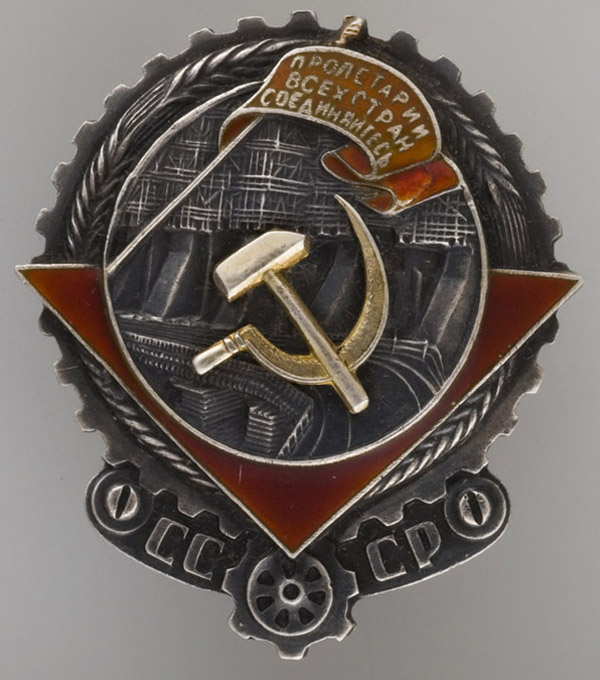
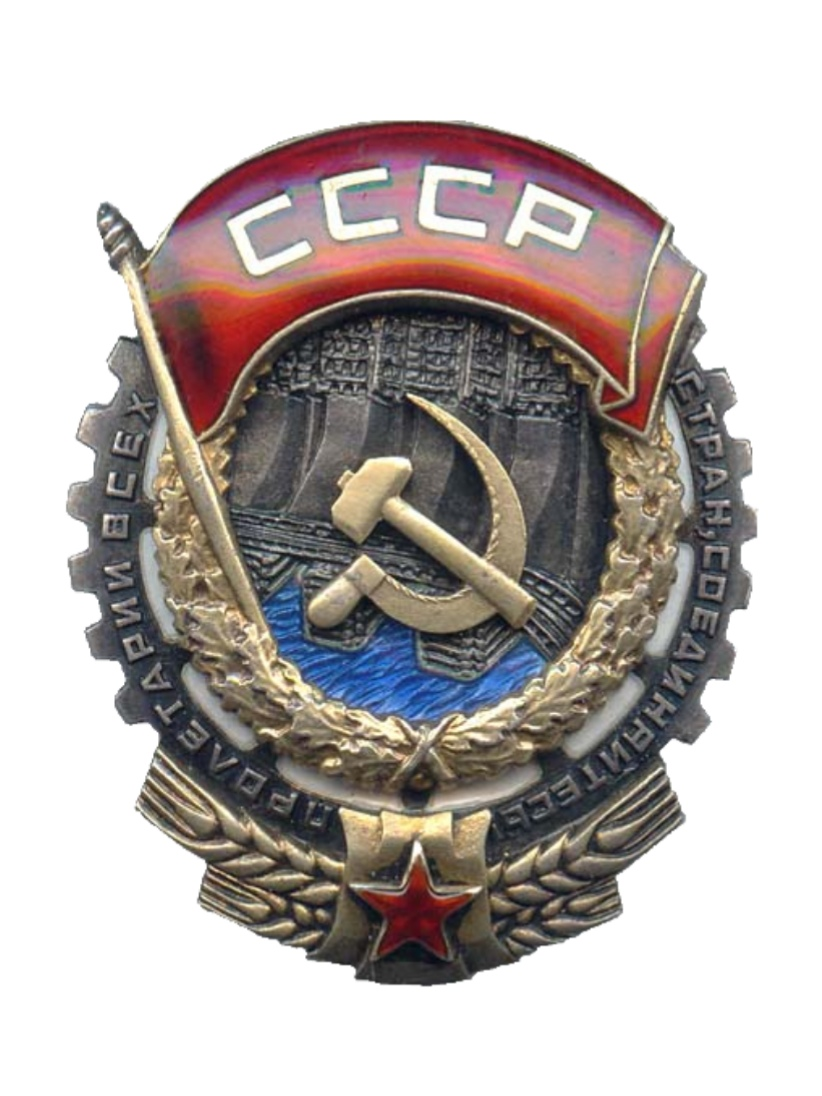
Type 1 obverse	Type 2 obverse
1931–1936	1936–1943

== Recipients (partial list) ==
The individuals listed below were recipients of the Order of the Red Banner of Labour.

The first recipient of the Order of the Red Banner of Labour of the RSFSR was Nikita Menchukov for saving an important bridge from being destroyed by flowing ice.

Order of the Red Banner of Labour of the USSR number 1 was presented to the Putilov (later Kirov) Works in Leningrad. The first individual awardees were V. Fedetov, A. Shelagin and M. Kyatkovsky for the rescue of a polar expedition.

Mikhail Gorbachev received the Order of the Red Banner of Labour for harvesting a record crop on his family's collective farm in 1949 at age 17, an honour which was very rare for someone so young. He is one of the Order's youngest recipients.

The last person to be awarded the order in the history of the USSR was Ioakim Sharoev, head of the department at the Russian Academy of Theatre Arts of the Ministry of Culture of the RSFSR. He was awarded the order in accordance with the decree of the President of the Soviet Union of December 21, 1991, "for services to the development of Soviet musical and pop art".

=== Six-time recipients ===
- Nikolay Maksimovich Belyaev, founder and head of the optical industry
- Nikolay Stepanovich Beznosov, deputy minister of Defense Industry of the USSR
- Mikhail Aleksandrovich Brezhnev, engineer
- Makar Fyodorovich Goryainov, general
- Alexander Konstantinovich Protazanov, first secretary of the East Kazakhstan Party organisation
- Nikolay Nicholaevich Smelyakov, Minister of General Machine Building of the USSR, director of the factory "Red Sormovo"
- Leonid Nikolaevich Solovyev, politician
- Aleksey Ivanovich Sorokin, politician
- Suleyman Azad oğlu Vazirov, Minister of Oil Industry in the Azerbaijani SSR

=== Five-time recipients ===
- Arnold Green, Soviet diplomat, Party and State figure
- Mikhail Alexandrovich Leontovich, physicist and academician
- Gennady Vasilevich Alekseenko, a specialist in the field of energy
- Aleksandr Fedorovich Belov, metallurgy academician
- Pavel Semyonovich Vlasov, Hero of Socialist Labour, director of the Novosibirsk Chemical Concentrates Plant
- Leonid Efimovich Grafov, Deputy Minister of the Coal Industry
- Ivan Timofeevich Grishin, Deputy Minister of Foreign Trade
- Nikolai Alekseevich Gundobin, Hero of Socialist Labour, 1st Deputy Minister of Transport of the USSR
- Aleksandr Viktorovich Dokukin, Corresponding Member of the USSR Academy of Sciences
- Leonid Fedorovich Ilichev, secretary of the CPSU Central Committee
- Vladimir Alekseevich Karlov, Hero of Socialist Labour, department head of the CPSU Central Committee
- Boris Vasilevich Kurchatov, doctor of chemical sciences
- Pavel Andreevich Maletin, Deputy Minister of Finance of the USSR (1939–1945, 1960–1969)
- Konstantin Dmitrievich Petukhov, Hero of Socialist Labour, General Director of PEMSO "Dynamo"
- Rasizade, Shamil Alievich, deputy prime-minister of Azerbaijan SSR (1970–1984)
- Aleksey Vladimirovich Romanov, editor of the newspaper "Soviet Culture"
- Ivan Dmitrievich Sosnov, Minister of Transport Construction of the USSR
- Tamara Khanum, People's Artist of USSR (1956), Uzbek dancer
- Konstantin Chibisov, Corresponding Member of USSR Academy of Sciences (1946)

=== Four-time recipients ===
- Rasul Gamzatovich Gamzatov, poet
- Levko Mykolajovych Revutskyi, composer, teacher, and activist
- Sabit Atayevich Orujev, Deputy Prime-minister of Azerbaijan SSR (1957–1959)
- Andrey Melitonovich Balanchivadze, composer
- Augusts Eduardovich Voss, politician and party functionary
- Natalia Mikhailovna Dudinskaya, prima ballerina
- Eugen Arturovich Kapp, composer and music educator
- Patriarch Alexy I, patriarch of the Russian Orthodox Church
- Galina Sergeyevna Ulanova, prima ballerina

=== Three-time recipients ===
- Konstantin Ustinovich Chernenko, fifth General Secretary of the Communist Party of the Soviet Union
- Yuri Vladimirovich Andropov, fourth General Secretary of the Communist Party of the Soviet Union
- Alexander Naumovich Frumkin, electrochemist, Hero of Socialist Labour
- Alexander Nikolaevich Yakovlev, politician and historian
- Grigory Naumovich Chukhray, film director and screenwriter
- Sopubek Begalievich Begaliev, politician
- Matvey Alkunovich Kapelyushnikov, mechanical engineer, Hero of Socialist Labour
- Georgy Nikolayevich Flyorov, nuclear physicist
- Boris Borisovich Pyotrovsky, academician, historian-orientalist and archaeologist
- Isaak Markovich Khalatnikov, physicist
- Max Arkadyevich Taitz, scientist in aerodynamics, theory of jet engines and flight testing of aircraft, one of the founders of the Gromov Flight Research Institute, recipient of the Stalin Prize (1949 and 1953), Honoured Scientist of the RSFSR
- Takey Esetovich Esetov, economist

=== Two-time recipients ===
- Isaak Zaltsman, Known as "King of Tanks" while manager of Chelyabinsk Tractor Plant and Kirov Plant.
- Andrey Nikolayevich Tupolev, aircraft designer
- Konstantin Petrovich Feoktistov, cosmonaut and eminent space engineer
- Aram Ilyich Khachaturian, composer
- Ginzburg, Vitaly Lazarevich, theoretical physicist, astrophysicist, Nobel laureate
- Kollontai, Alexandra Mikhailovna, first female government minister in Europe, one of the first female diplomats in modern times
- Khrennikov, Tikhon Nikolayevich, composer and pianist
- Klavdiya Sergeyevna Kildisheva, aviation engineer and Hero of Socialist Labor
- Yakov Borisovich Zeldovich, physicist
- Nikolai Ivanovich Ryzhkov, politician
- Irina Konstantinovna Rodnina, Olympic gold medalist figure skater
- Zuleykha Seyidmammadova, fighter pilot
- Ilyushin, Vladimir Sergeyevich, test pilot
- Yuli Mikhailovich Vorontsov diplomat and ambassador
- Arkady Ilyich Ostashev laureate of the Lenin and state prizes of the, senior test pilot of missiles and space-rocket complexes of OKB-1, the disciple and companion of Sergei Pavlovich Korolev.
- Dimitry Dmitrievich Venediktov Deputy Health Minister of the USSR
- Shamama Hasanova, Azerbaijani cotton producer and politician.
- Kim Pen Hwa, collective farm manager
- Aleksey Vasilievich Shubnikov crystallographer
- Khalimakhon Suleymanova, cotton farmer

=== Single awards ===
- Leila Abashidze, actor and writer
- Alisa Aksyonova, museum director
- Pavel Alexandrov, mathematician
- Araxie Babayan, chemist
- Fyokla Bezzubova, folklore writer
- Kateryna Boloshkevich, weaver and statesperson
- Mariya Borodayevskaya, geologist
- Lyudmila Byakova, seamstress
- Viktor Stepanovich Chernomyrdin, Prime Minister of Russia (1992–1998)
- Clementine Churchill
- Ilya Devin, writer
- Valentina Dimitrieva, farm worker
- Glafira Dorosh, chef, the only recipient of a Soviet order for a recipe
- Lev Dyomin, cosmonaut
- Lydia Fotiyeva, personal secretary of Vladimir Lenin
- Andrei Frost, physical chemist
- Ivan Gevorkyan, prominent Soviet Armenian surgeon and scientist
- Äxmät İsxaq, Tatar poet and translator
- Saima Karimova, Russian geologist
- Anatoly Karpov, World Chess Champion
- Faina Kotkova, weaver
- Valentina Khetagurova (1914–1992), founder of the Khetagurovite Campaign
- Marcus Klingberg, Israeli scientist and Soviet spy
- Boris Kozo-Polyansky, botanist and evolutionary biologist.
- Elizaveta Lastochkina, teacher of the deaf
- Jack Littlepage, US mining expert and Soviet Deputy Commissar
- Vladimir Lobashev, physicist
- Natalia Martirosyan, engineer
- Mikhail Mil, aerospace engineer
- Rusudana Nikoladze, Georgian inorganic chemist Mariya Orlyk, teacher and politician
- Sergei Orlov, sculptor and painter
- Maksim Ovodenko, metallurgist
- Nicolay Paskevich, painter
- Leida Peips, Estonian milker
- Ivan Poddubny, professional wrestler
- Vladimir Rvachev, mathematician
- Yevgeny Primakov, Speaker of the Soviet of the Union of the Supreme Soviet of the Soviet Union
- Sergiu Rădăuțanu, Moldovan physicist
- Leonid Rogozov, physician who took part in the sixth Soviet Antarctic Expedition in 1960–1961 and performed his own appendectomy
- Arnold Rüütel, ex-president of Estonia
- Galina Serdyukovskaya, hygienist, academic and politician
- Nikolay Semyonov, physicist and chemist
- Yuri Levitan, Soviet radio announcer
- Lyudmila Shevtsova – athlete, Olympic champion and 800 m world record holder
- Mikhail Shuisky, opera singer
- Vasily Shukshin, actor, writer, screenwriter and film director
- Galina Skakun, cattle breeder and milkmaid
- Alexander Yakovlev, aeronautical engineer
- Alexander Yanshin, geologist
- Yevgeny Yevtushenko, poet, novelist, essayist, dramatist, screenwriter, actor, editor, and film director
- Melita Stedman Norwood Spy USSR - Work 1930–1972.
- Hugh Lincoln Cooper American Engineer
- Olga Avilova, surgeon
- Barno Itzhakova, Shashmaqam folk singer
- Sergi Jikia, Georgian historian and orientalist, founder of the Turkology in Georgia.
- Nina Pigulevskaya, Soviet historian and orientalist.
- Leonid Kirensky, physicist
- Boris Miller, Iranianist scholar
- Alexey Dobryden, metallurgist and party leader

=== Institutions, organisations, localities ===
- Komsomol
- Vilnius University
- City of Kovrov
- Saint Petersburg State University
- City of Mykolaiv
- City of Podolsk
- Bolshevichka clothes factory
- Zvyazda state newspaper
- East Siberian Railway
- National Library of Russia
- Kuban State University of Technology
- Moscow State University of Fine Chemical Technologies
- 8th Soviet Rifle Division
- Kamensk-Uralsky Metallurgical Works, in 1978
- Sovetskaya Entsiklopediya
- Trolza trolleybus factory
- Ural State Medical University
- Uraltransmash
- Yerevan State University
- Estonian Drama Theatre

== See also ==
- Orders, decorations, and medals of the Soviet Union
- Orders, decorations, and medals of the Soviet Republics
- Order of the Red Banner
