= Karmirgyugh =

Village in Gegharkunik, Armenia

Karmirgyugh Կարմիրգյուղ
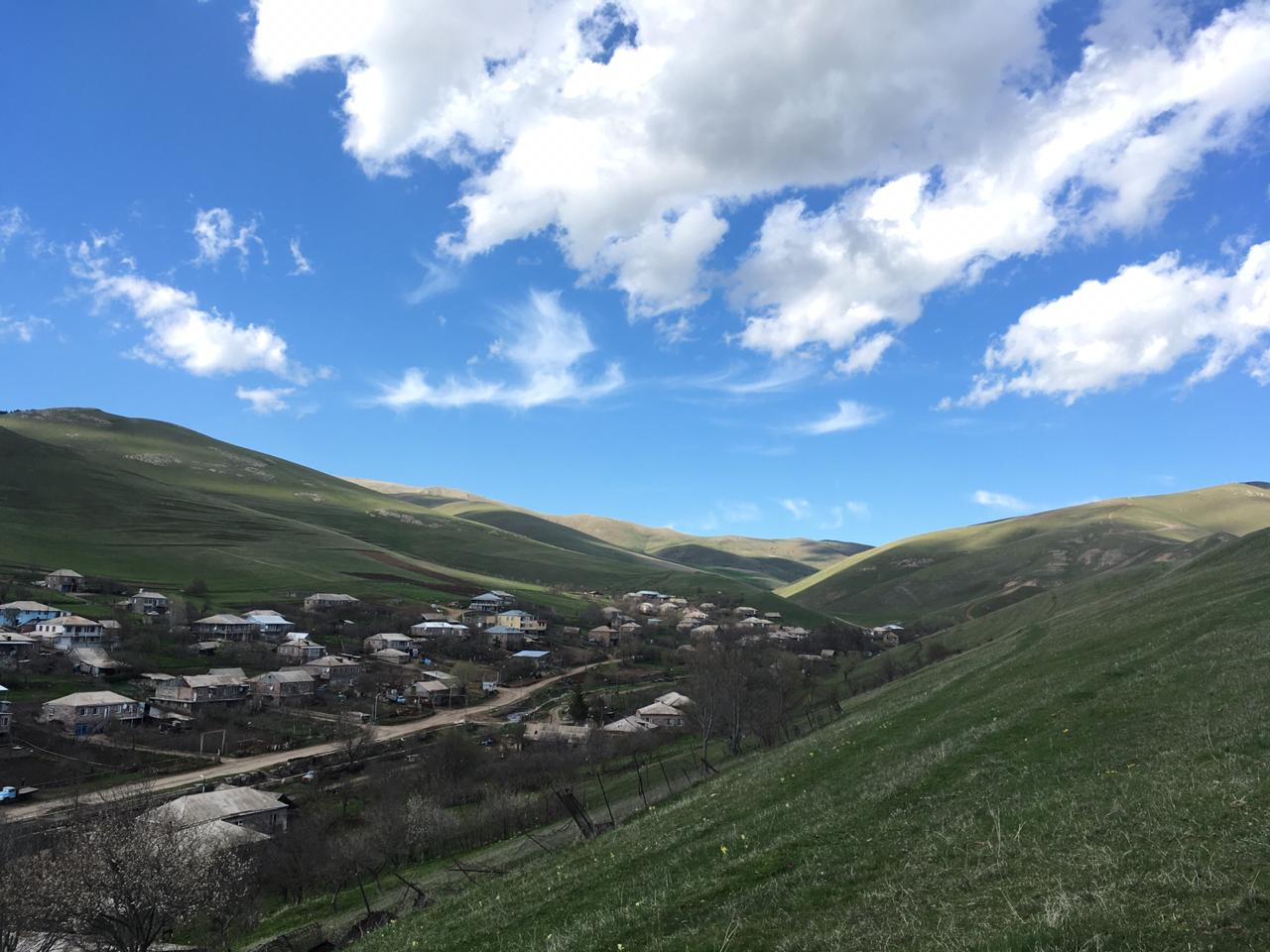
- A view of Karmirgyugh

- Location within Armenia Location within Gegharkunik
- Coordinates: 40°19′50″N 45°11′02″E
- Country: Armenia
- Province: Gegharkunik
- Municipality: Gavar
- Founded: 1831

Population (2011)
  - Total: 4,964
- Time zone: UTC+4 (AMT)

Karmirgyugh (Armenian: Կարմիրգյուղ, lit. 'Red Village') is a village in the Gavar Municipality of the Gegharkunik Province of Armenia.

== Etymology ==
The village is also known as Gyukh, and was known as Kulali and Ghulali until 1940.

== History ==
The village was founded in 1831 by emigrants from Gavar. It contains two churches with khachkars, St. Astvatsatsin and St. Grigor, and was the discovery site of a boundary stone of King Artashes, inscribed in Aramaic. There are also Urartian ruins nearby.

== Gallery ==
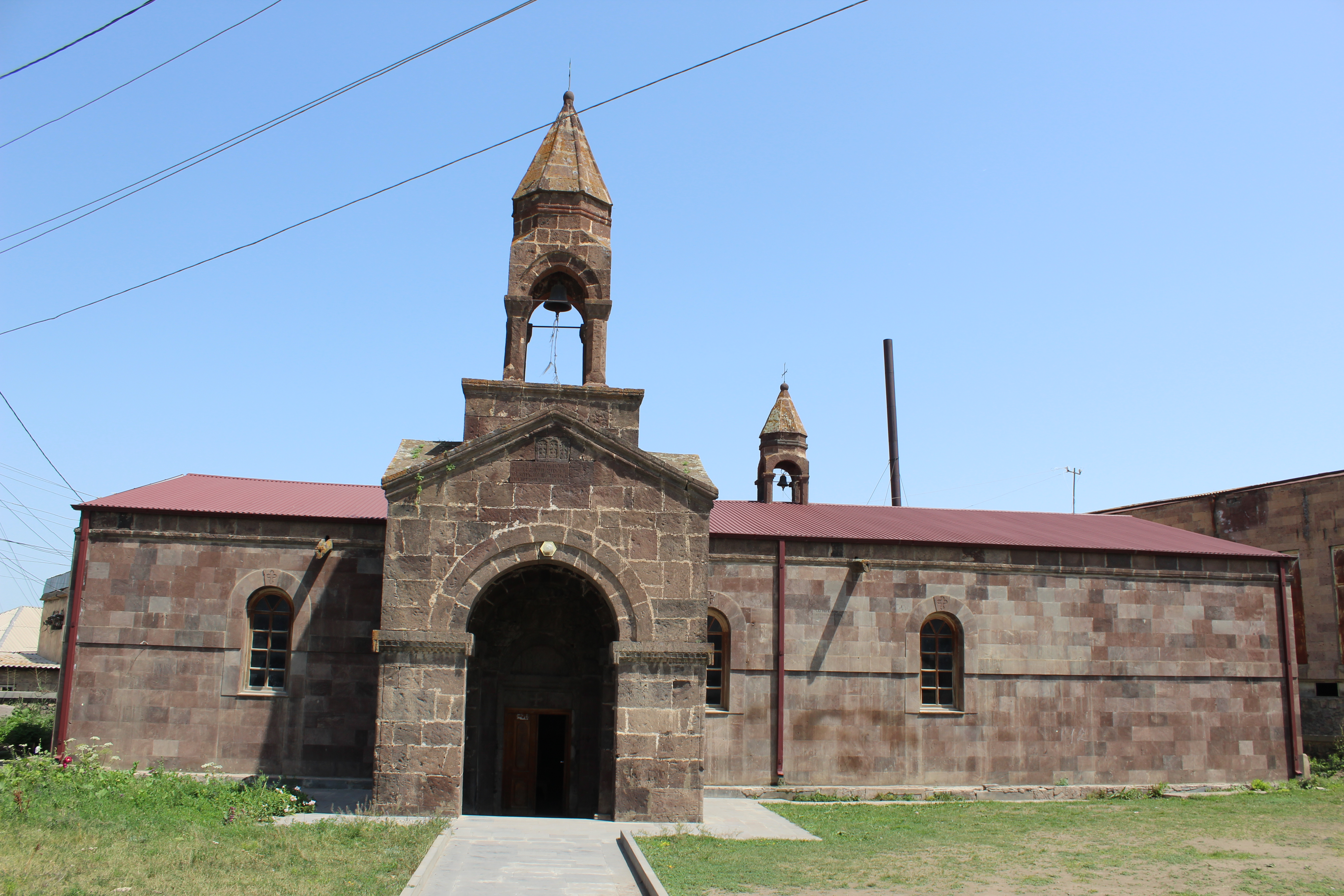
St. Astvatsatsin Church

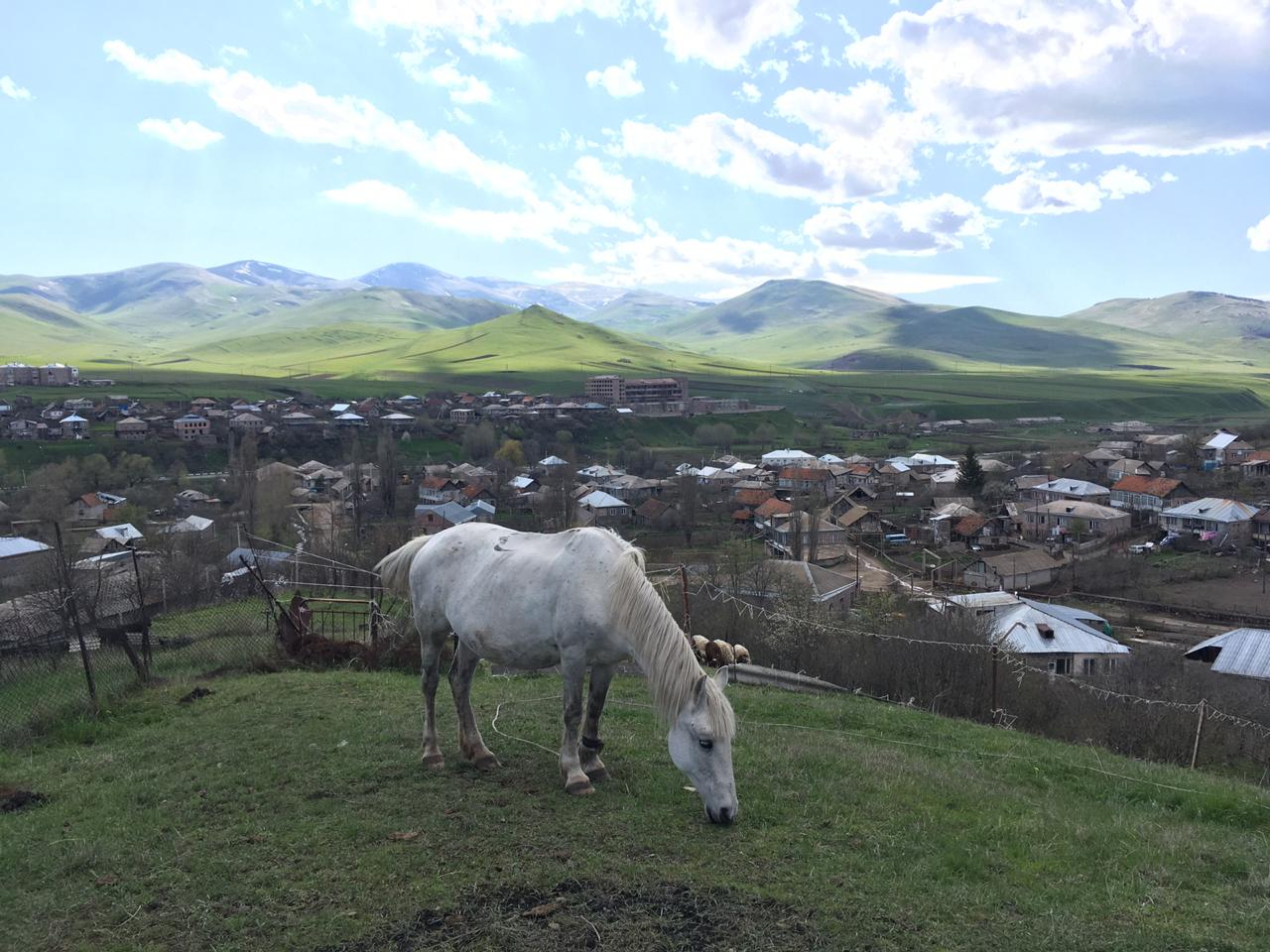
Scenery around Karmirgyugh

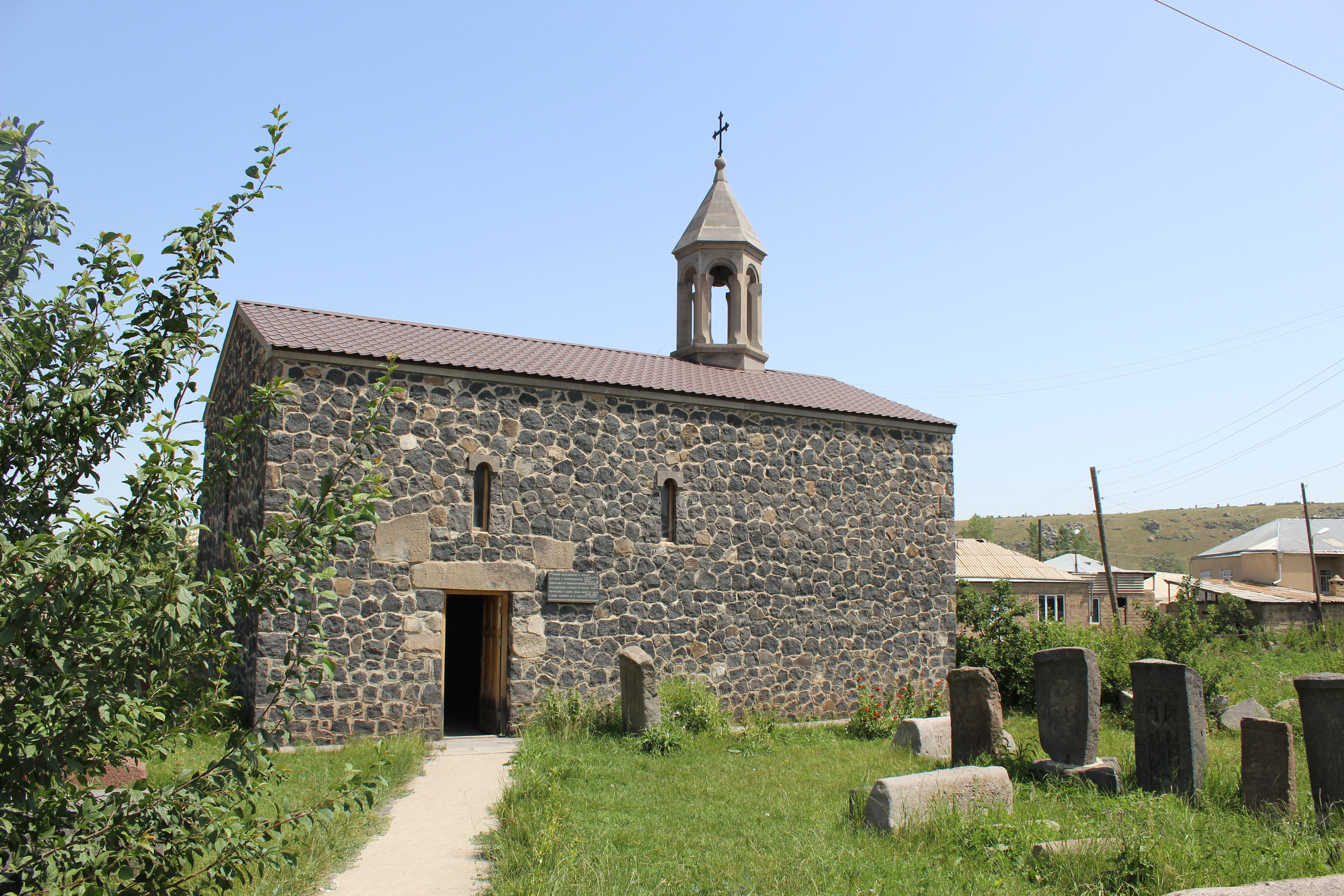
St. Grigor Church

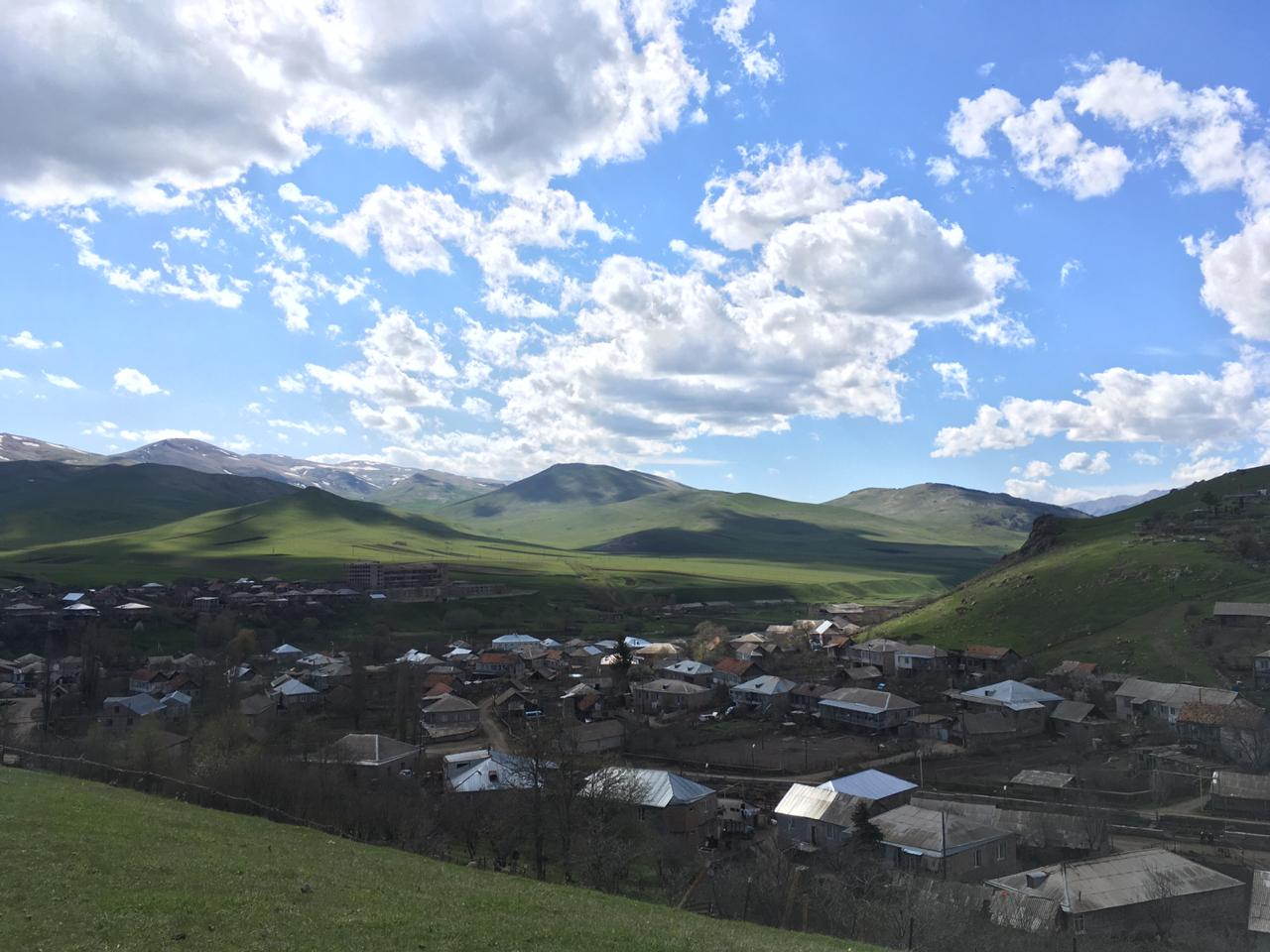
A view of Karmirgyugh and surrounding mountains

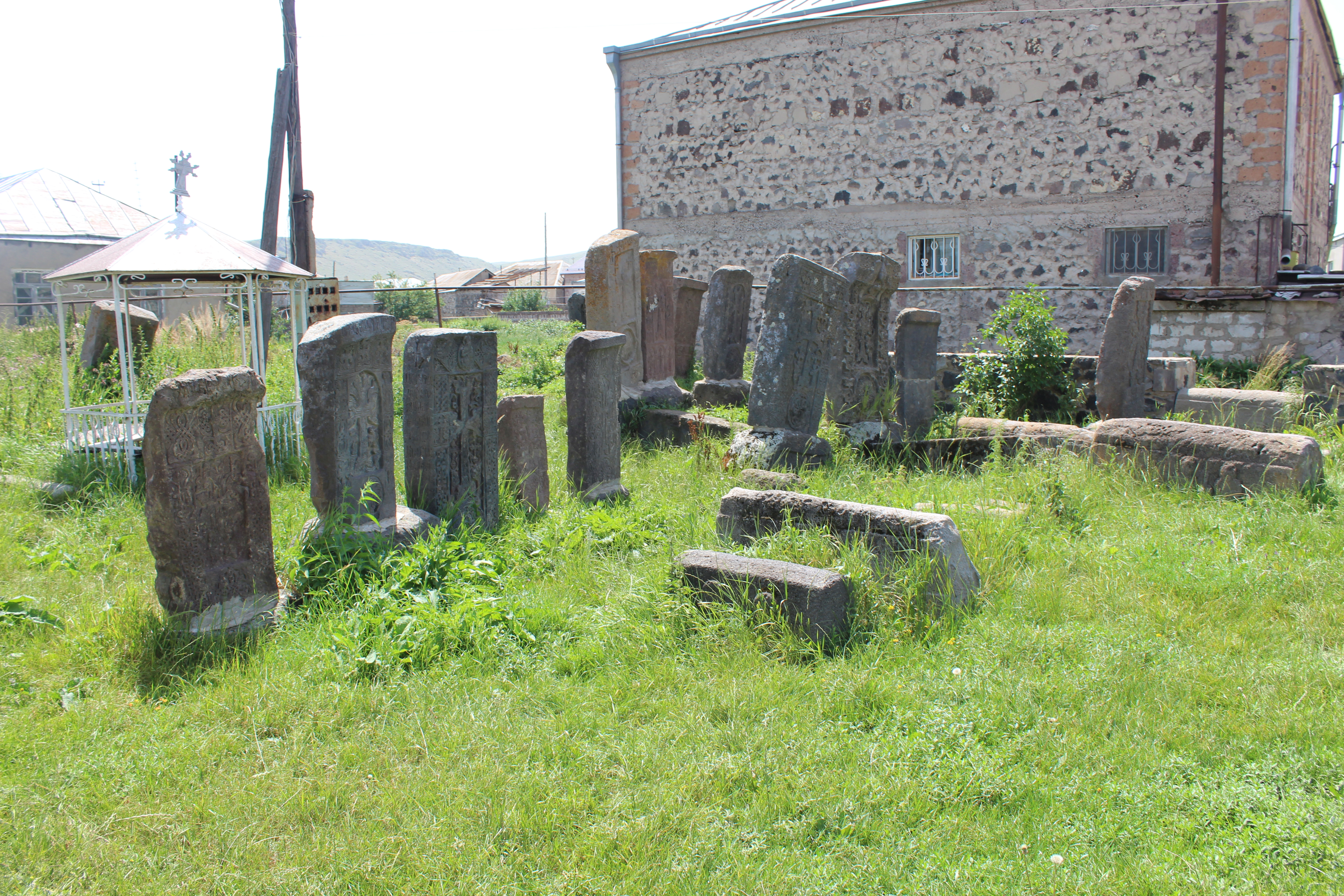
St. Grigor Church and khachkars

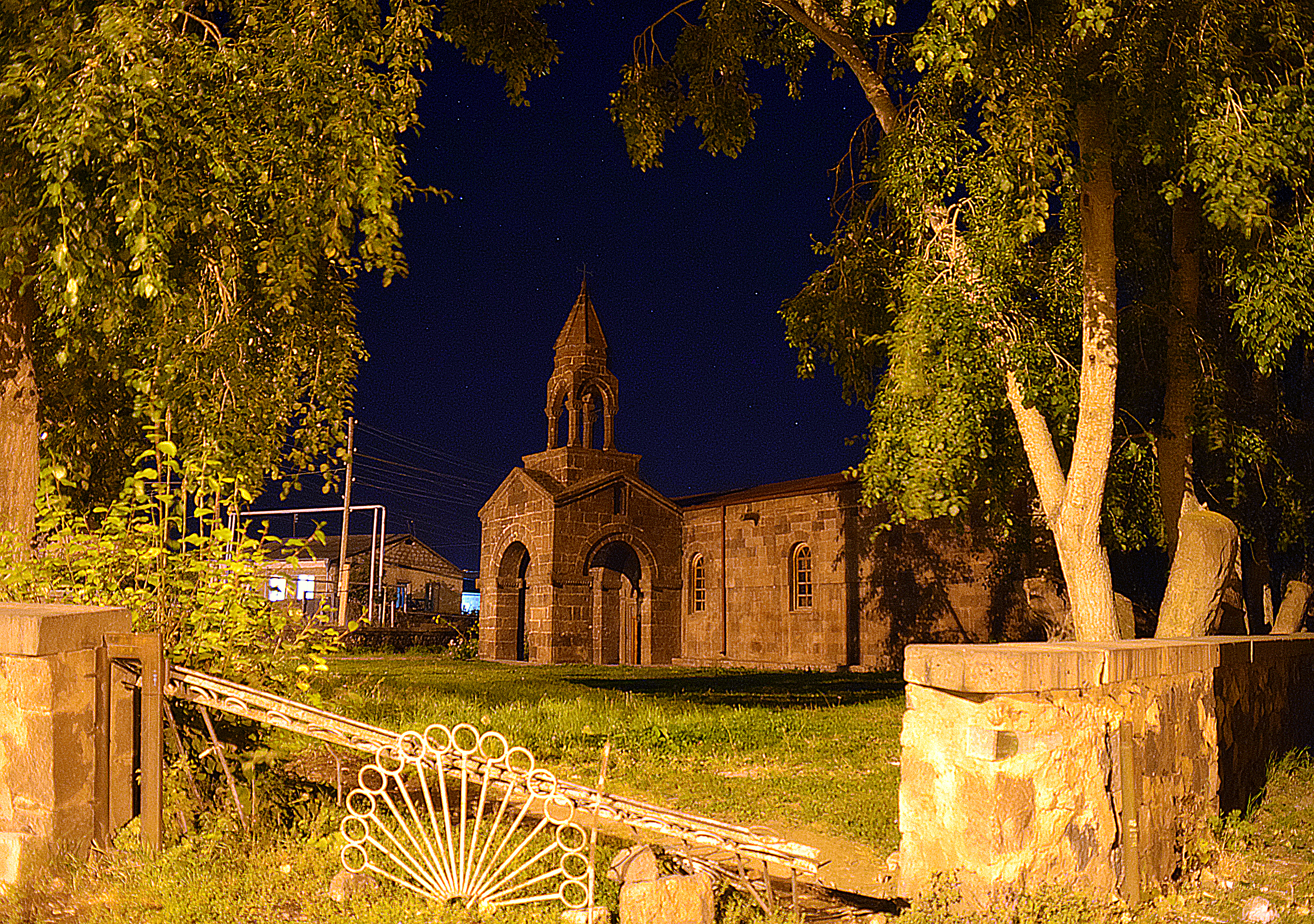
St. Astvatsatsin Church
