= List of Ramsar sites of Poland =

Location of Ramsar sites in Poland

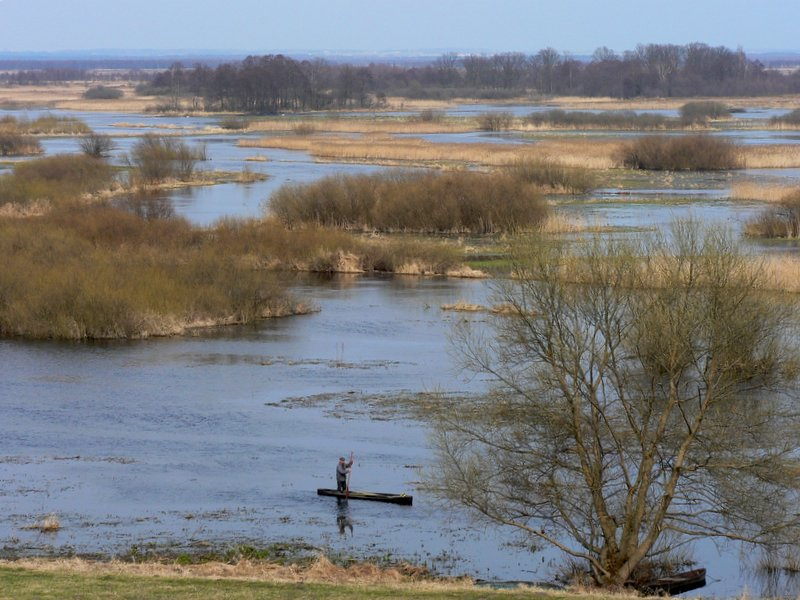
Biebrza River in Biebrza National Park at Burzyn

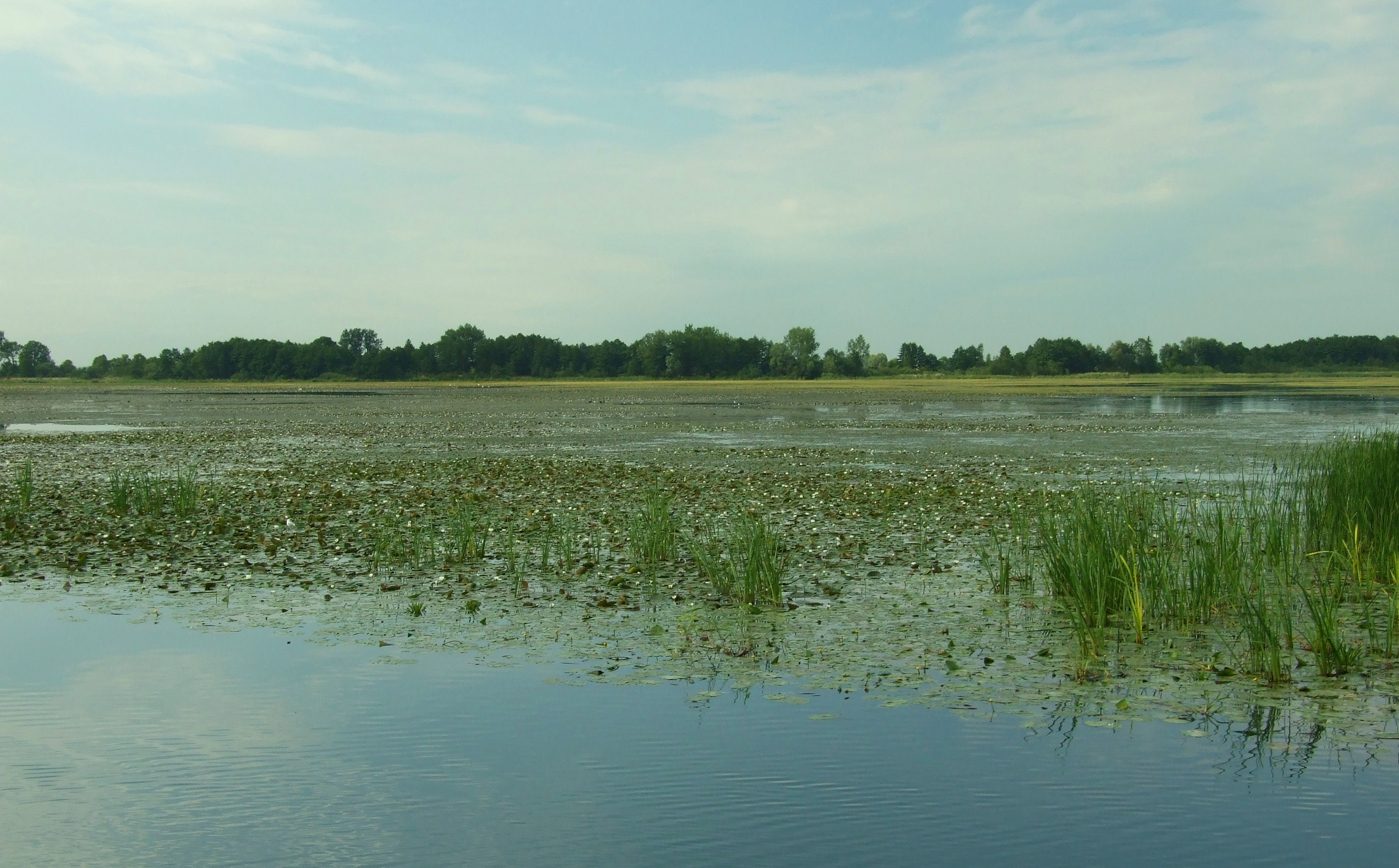
Drużno Lake

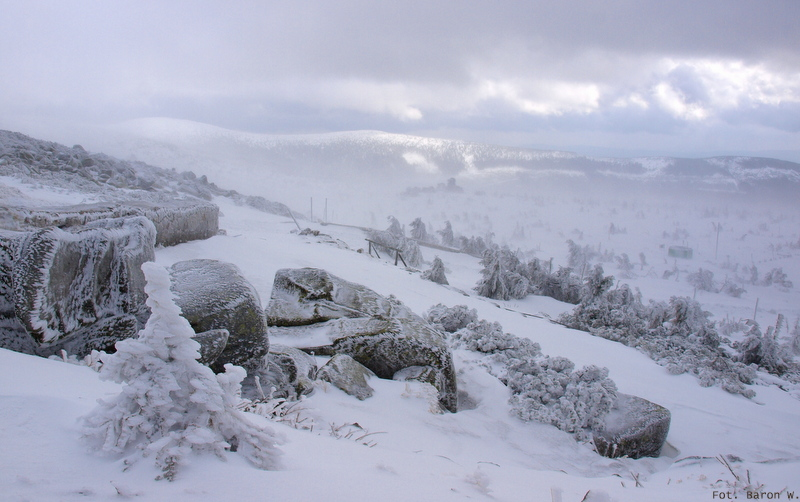
View from Szrenica towards the West in Karkonosze National Park

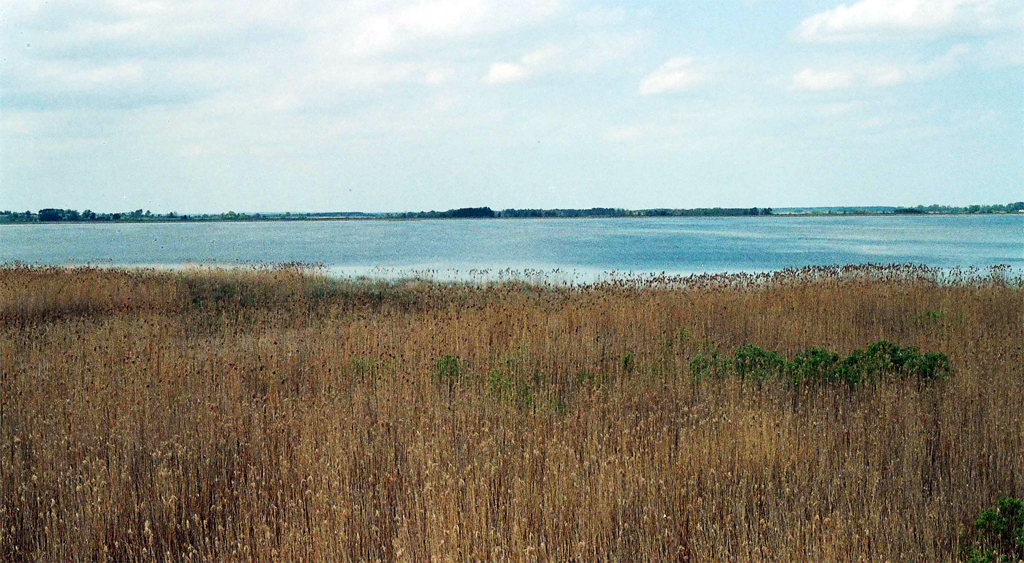
Łuknajno Lake in the Masurian Lake District

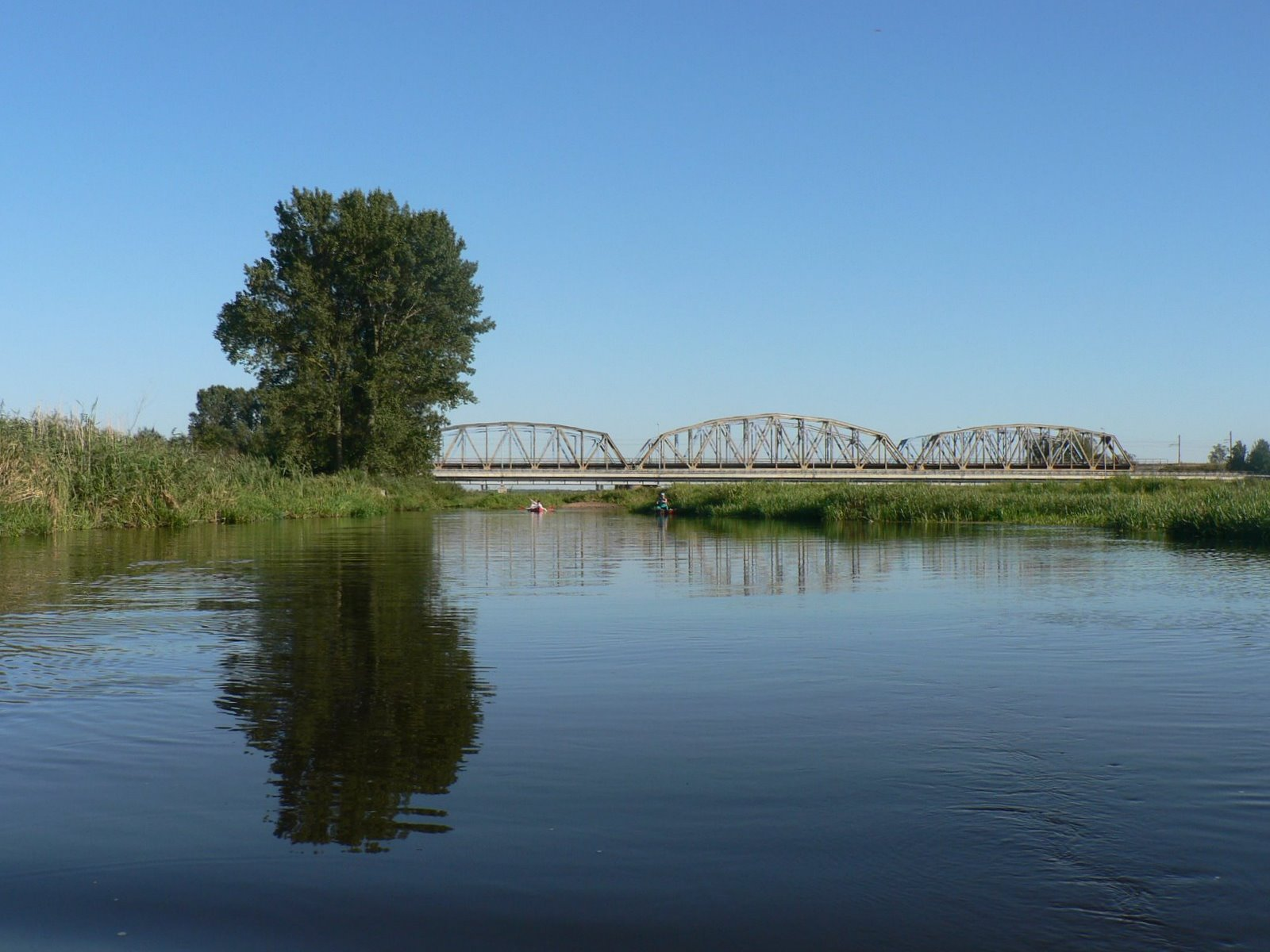
Narew River in Narew National Park at Uhowo

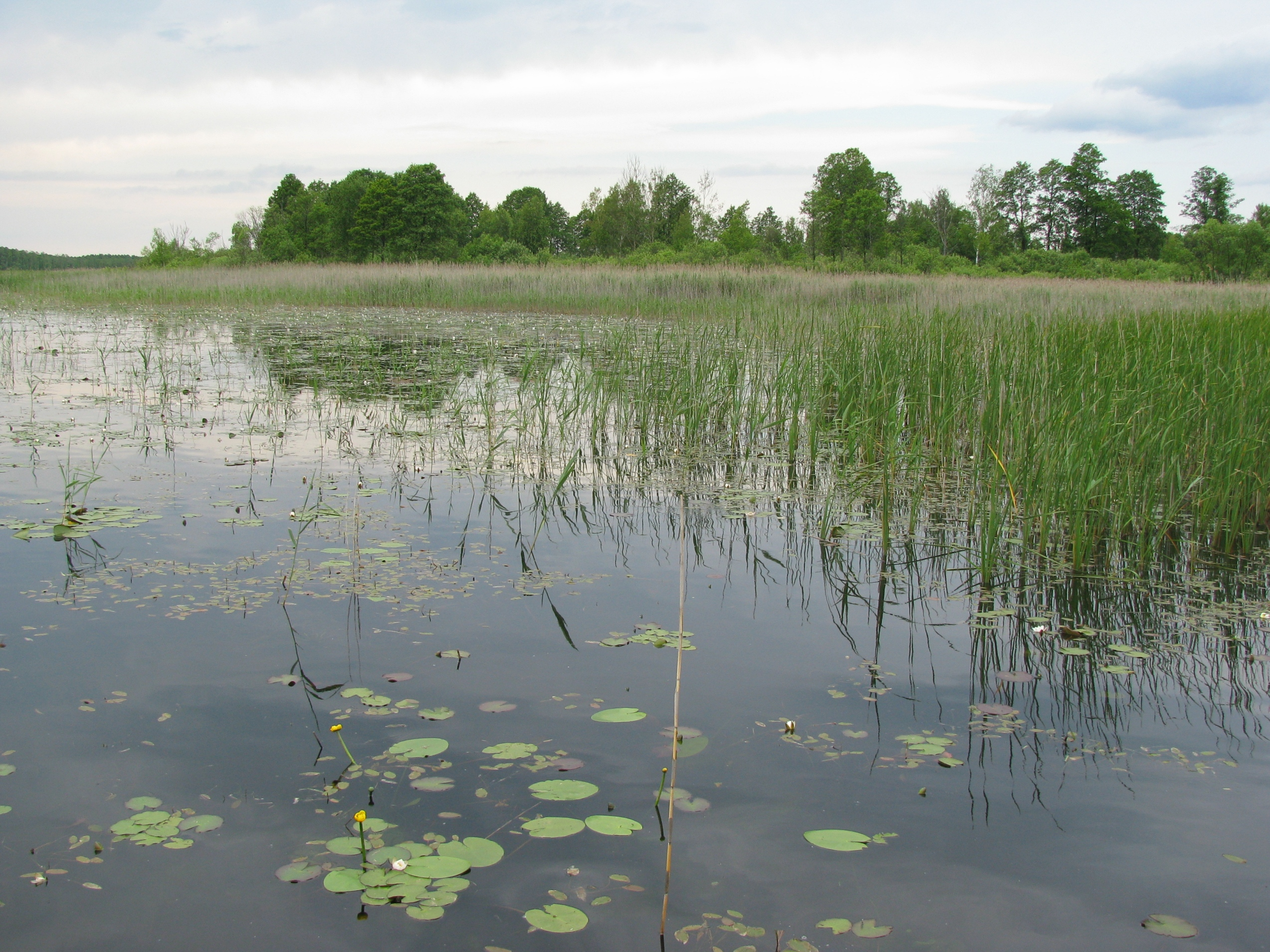
Łukie Lake in Polesie National Park

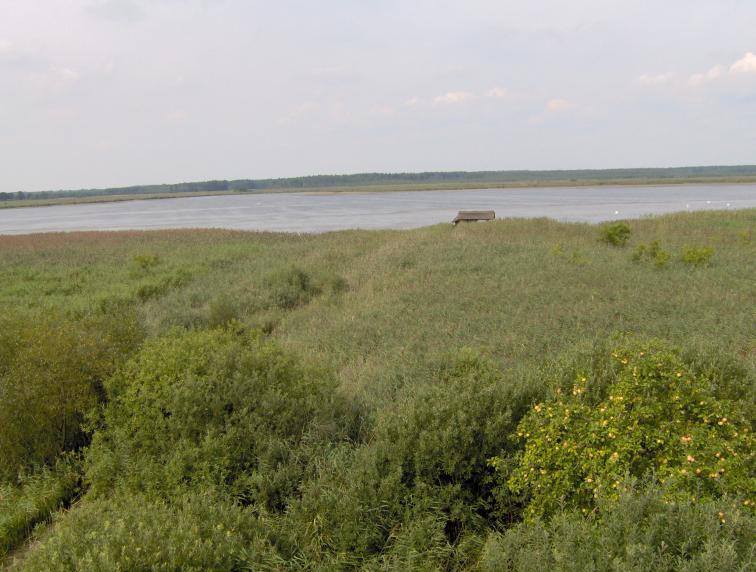
Świdwie Lake

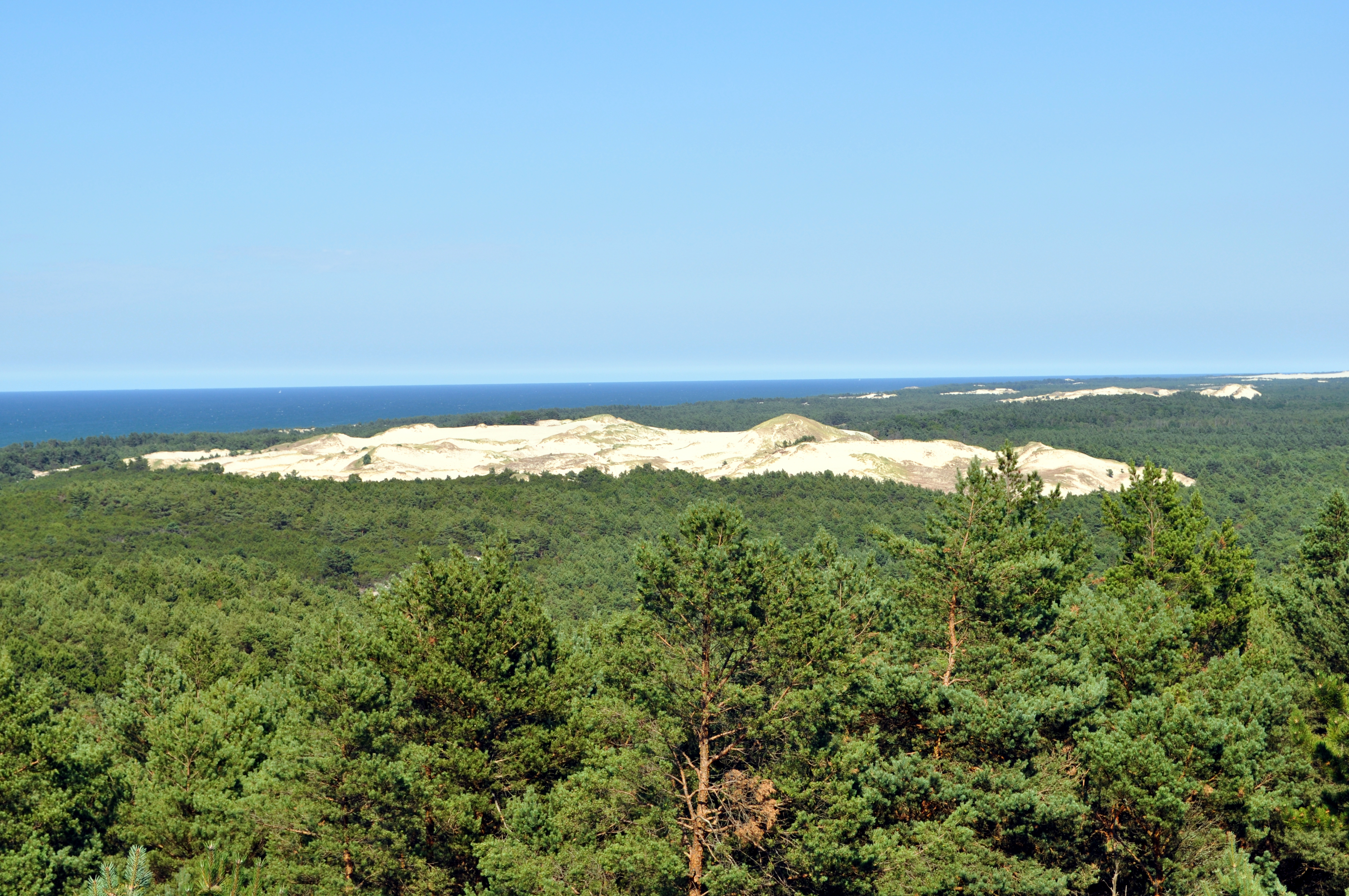
A view of the Baltic seacoast at Słowiński National Park

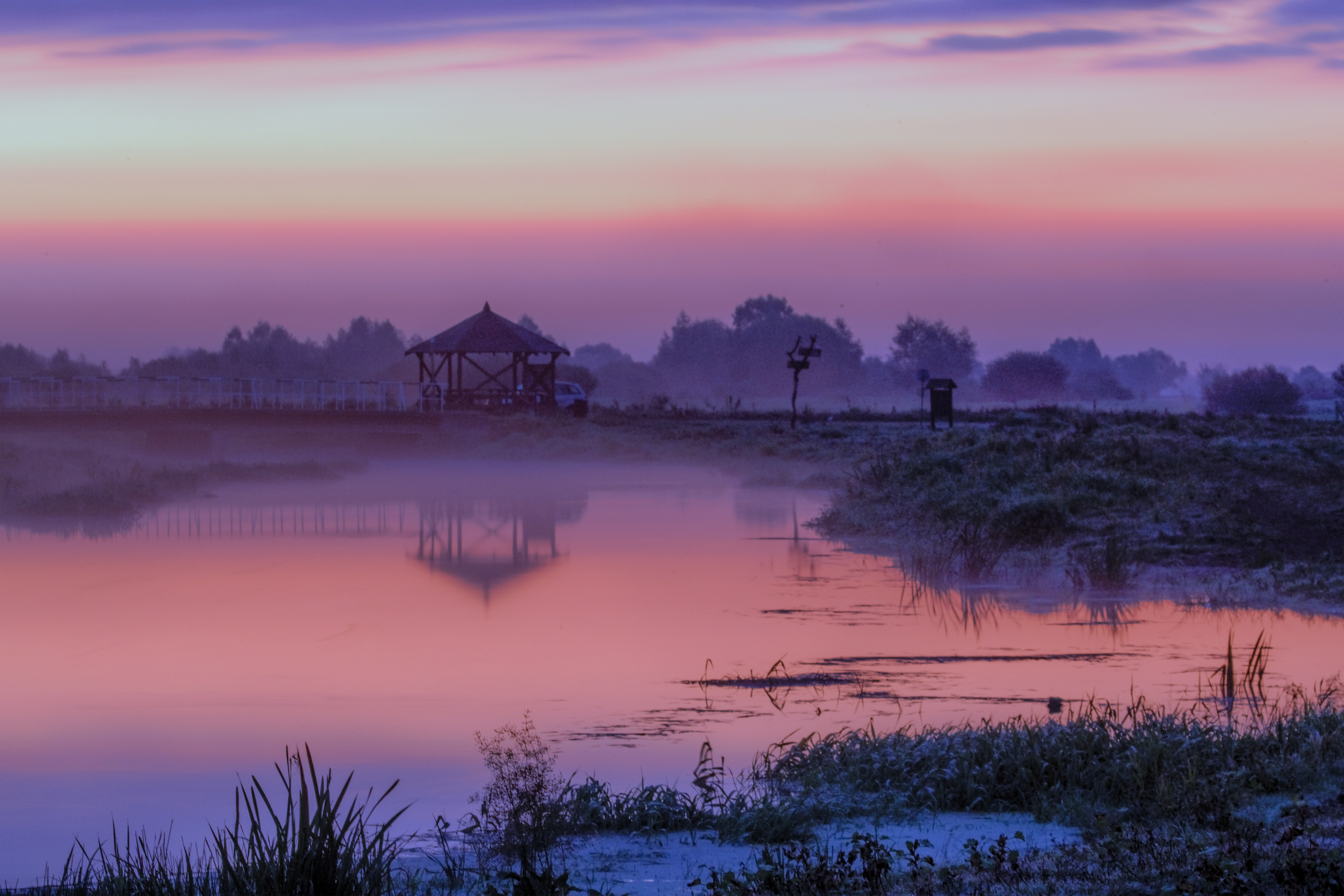
Warta river mouth in Ujście Warty National Park

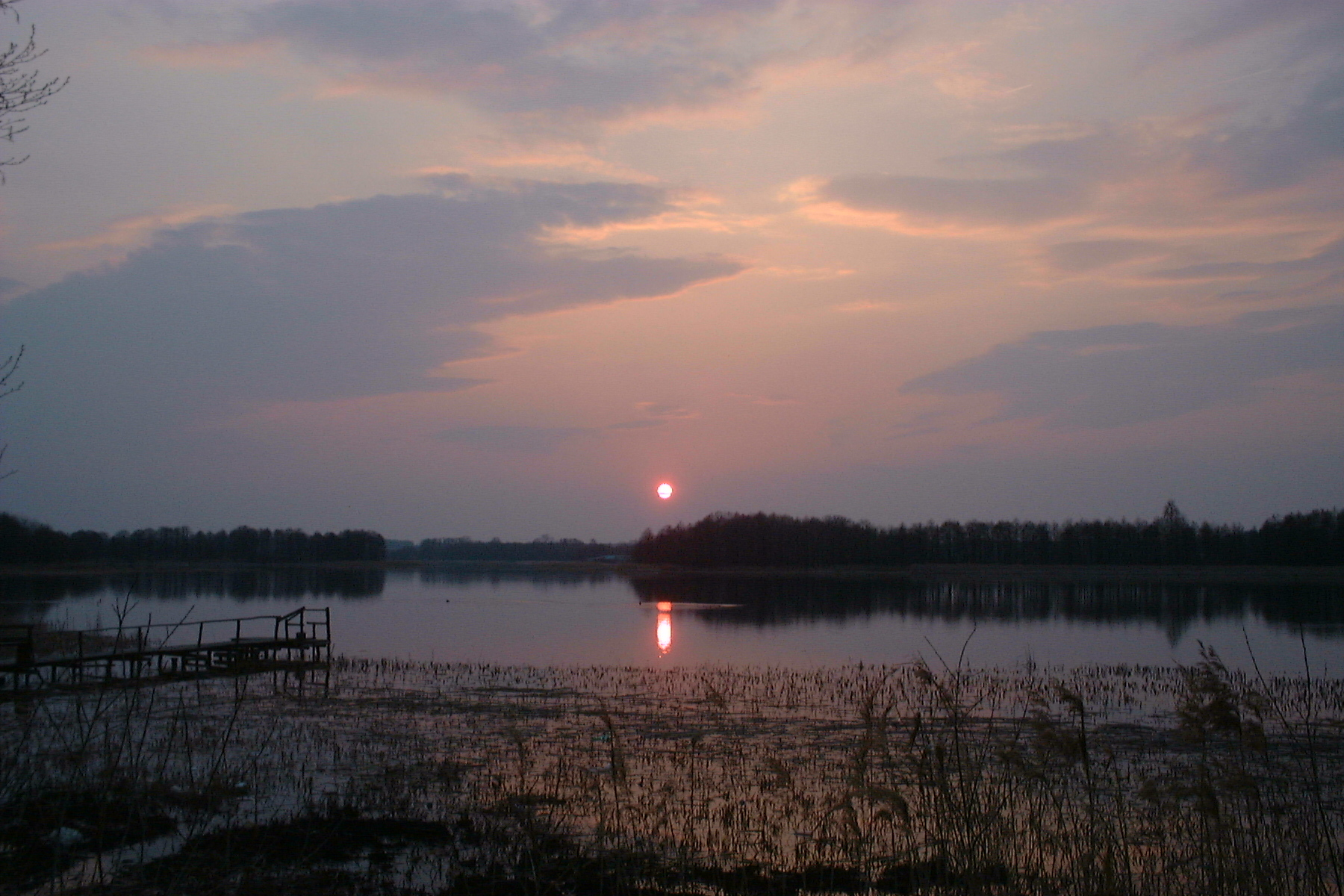
Wigry Lake at sunset in Wigry National Park

The Ramsar Convention on Wetlands is an international treaty for the conservation and sustainable utilization of wetlands, i.e., to stem the progressive encroachment on and loss of wetlands now and in the future, recognizing the fundamental ecological functions of wetlands and their economic, cultural, scientific, and recreational value. Since the convention became effective in Poland on 22 March 1978, the designation of Wetland of International Importance has been applied to thirteen locations in the country, which combine to form an area of 145,075 ha (358,490 acres).

== Sites ==
- (Site 756) Biebrza National Park, Podlaskie Voivodeship, 592 km^{2} (229 sq mi)

The site consists of a series of temperate zone forested and non-forested bogs that provide a variety of habitats for birds, mammals, fish and plants. The available habitats are ecologically typical of a riparian area including swamps and tussocks separated from cultivated areas by black alder (Latin: Alnus glutinosa) and white willow (Latin: Salix alba) forested areas.

- (Site 1563) Drużno Lake Nature Reserve, Warmian-Masurian Voivodeship, 31 km^{2} (12 sq mi)

The site is a shallow, overgrown lake in the Vistula Delta near the Baltic Sea coast that was once part of the Vistula Lagoon. The lake itself holds a variety of hydrophilic plants, including an array of nymphaeaceae, and is surrounded by marshes dominated by common reed beds (Latin: Phragmites) that transition into wooded wetlands of black alder (Latin: Alnus glutinosa).

- (Site 284) Karaś Lake Nature Reserve, Warmian-Masurian Voivodeship,8 km^{2} (3.1 sq mi)

The site is a large, shallow glacial lake typical of those located in the Masurian Lake District. The littoral zone surrounding the lake provides significant opportunities for wetland bird breeding habitats in the extensive reed beds, bogs and in the surrounding wetland forests.

- (Site 1566) Karkonosze National Park, Lower Silesian Voivodeship, 0.4 km^{2} (0.15 sq mi)

The site consists of three subalpine zone bogs along the Czech border, in the Karkonosze Mountains. The bogs are located at the watershed dividing the Baltic Sea and North Sea basins. The bogs themselves support an extensive algal community while the surrounding area consists of dwarf Mountain pine (Latin: Pinus mugo) and low-growth vegetation.

- (Site 166) Łuknajno Lake Nature Reserve, Warmian-Masurian Voivodeship,7 km^{2} (2.7 sq mi), Designated 1977

The site is a glacial lake typical of those located in the Masurian Lake District with an area of 6.8 square kilometres (2.6 sq mi), and a maximum depth of 3 metres (9.8 ft). The lake is connected with nearby Sniardwy Lake by a channel. The site is a breeding ground for water birds such as grebe, water rail (Latin: Rallus aquaticus), moorhen, grey heron (Latin: Ardea cinerea), bearded reedling (Latin: Panurus biarmicus), white-tailed eagle (Latin: Haliaeetus albicilla), osprey (Latin: Pandion haliaetus), rust-coloured kite, cormorant and black tern (Latin: Chlidonias niger). The lake has been a protected location since 1937 as a habitat of the mute swan (Latin: Cygnus olor), every year there are a dozen to tens of dozens of nesting pairs, and during moulting they arrive in numbers reaching up to 2,000 birds.

- (Site 758) Milicz Ponds Nature Reserve, Lower Silesian Voivodeship,53 km^{2} (20 sq mi)

The site, located within Barycz Valley Landscape Park, consists of various small ponds in the Barycz River valley with a total area of about 77 square kilometres (30 sq mi). The ponds are surrounded by forests, meadows and cultivated areas. The ponds provide important spring and autumn migration habitat for a variety of geese, ducks and other waterbirds.

- (Site 1564) Narew National Park, Podlaskie Voivodeship, 73.5 km^{2} (28.4 sq mi)

The site is a 35 kilometres (22 mi) section of the Narew River. It is a swampy valley with moraine hills typical of a braided river. Depending on the season and the level of the water table, several riparian area ecosystems are available including swamps, tussocks with surrounding black alder (Latin: Alnus glutinosa) and white willow (Latin: Salix alba) forested areas.

- (Site 1565) Polesie National Park, Lublin Voivodeship, 98 km^{2} (38 sq mi)

The site comprises a vast open lowland landscape with a mosaic of swamps, moors, lakes, rivers and forests located between the basins of the Bug and Wieprz rivers. The site is part of the European Ecological Corridor of the Bug River. The location supports bird species including raptors such as lesser spotted eagle (Latin: Aquila pomarina), hen harrier (Latin: Circus cyaneus) and Montagu's harrier (Latin: Circus pygargus) and birds such as aquatic warbler (Latin: Acrocephalus paludicola), marsh sandpiper (Latin: Tringa stagnatilis) and Eurasian cranes (Latin: Grus grus). The area is considered to be an important crossing point for migratory birds. The north–south flyways and east–west flyways of birds meet in the region. The areas consists of boreal Scots pine (Latin: Pinus sylvestris) forests, black alder (Latin: Alnus glutinosa) wetland forests, meadows and peatbog (raised bog, transitional bog and fen) ecosystems.

- (Site 285) Seven Island Lake Nature Reserve, Warmian-Masurian Voivodeship,10 km^{2} (3.9 sq mi)

The site consists of Oświn Lake and the surrounding area, located on the border with the Kaliningrad Oblast (an exclave of Russia) for a total area of approximately 10 square kilometres (3.9 sq mi), consisting of about 3.5 square kilometres (1.4 sq mi) of water, 6 square kilometres (2.3 sq mi) of marshland and 0.5 square kilometres (0.19 sq mi) of wetland forest. It is an important way-station for migratory waterbirds such as geese and ducks.

- (Site 283) Świdwie Nature Reserve, West Pomeranian Voivodeship, 9.8 km^{2} (3.8 sq mi)

A freshwater lake in Wkrzańska Forest near the German border. The lake is dominated by common reed beds (Latin: Phragmites) and sedge colonies (Latin: Cyperaceae) with little open water. It is an important way-station for migratory waterbirds such as geese and ducks.

- (Site 757) Słowiński National Park, Pomeranian Voivodeship, 182 km^{2} (70 sq mi), Designated 1995

The site consists of set of dunes, brackish lakes, bogs, and wetland forests on the southern Baltic Sea coast between Łeba and Rowy, Poland. The coastal aeolian processes have produced some of the most extensive and active mobile sand dunes, which can reach 30 m (98 ft) high, on the Baltic Sea. Coastal erosion and other geo-morphological processes lead to the creation of sand-bars, forming brackish lakes and bogs. The area consists of a series of vegetation zones going from the sand communities of the coastline towards the forests of the mainland. The forest includes beech (Latin: Fagus sylvatica), birch (Latin: Betula pubescens), alder (Latin: Alnus glutinosa), pine and oak. It is an important way station for migrating wader birds and waterbirds such as geese, ducks and swans. The white-tailed eagle (Latin: Haliaeetus albicilla) and other birds nest at the site.

- (Site 282) Ujście Warty National Park, Lubusz Voivodeship, 42 km^{2} (16 sq mi)

The location is an artificial reservoir, at the confluence of the Warta and Oder rivers, near the German border. The site is set in the Warta River floodplain and is surrounded by marshes. It is an important wintering location for migratory waterbirds such as geese and ducks.

- (Site 1567) Wigry National Park, Podlaskie Voivodeship, 151 km^{2} (58 sq mi)

The site is a diverse wetland system around Wigry Lake and 42 smaller glacial lakes surrounded by boreal woodlands. The location shelters three globally endangered bird species, red kite (Latin: Milvus milvus), white-tailed eagle (Latin: Haliaeetus albicilla) and corn crake (Latin: Crex crex).

== See also ==
- List of Ramsar Wetlands of International Importance
- Protected areas of Poland
