= Ecoregions in Poland =

Terrestrial ecoregions of Poland

Central European mixed forests

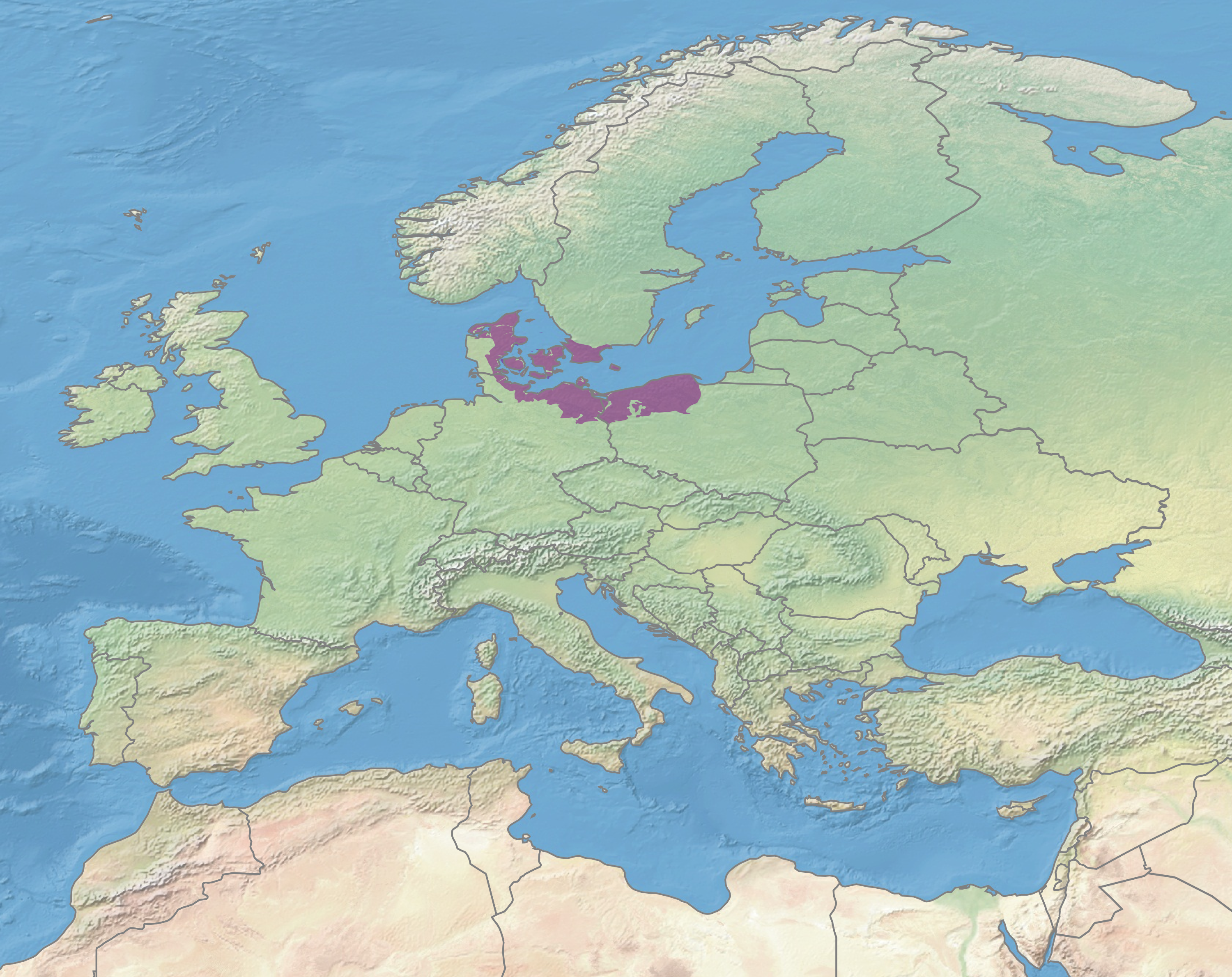
Baltic mixed forests

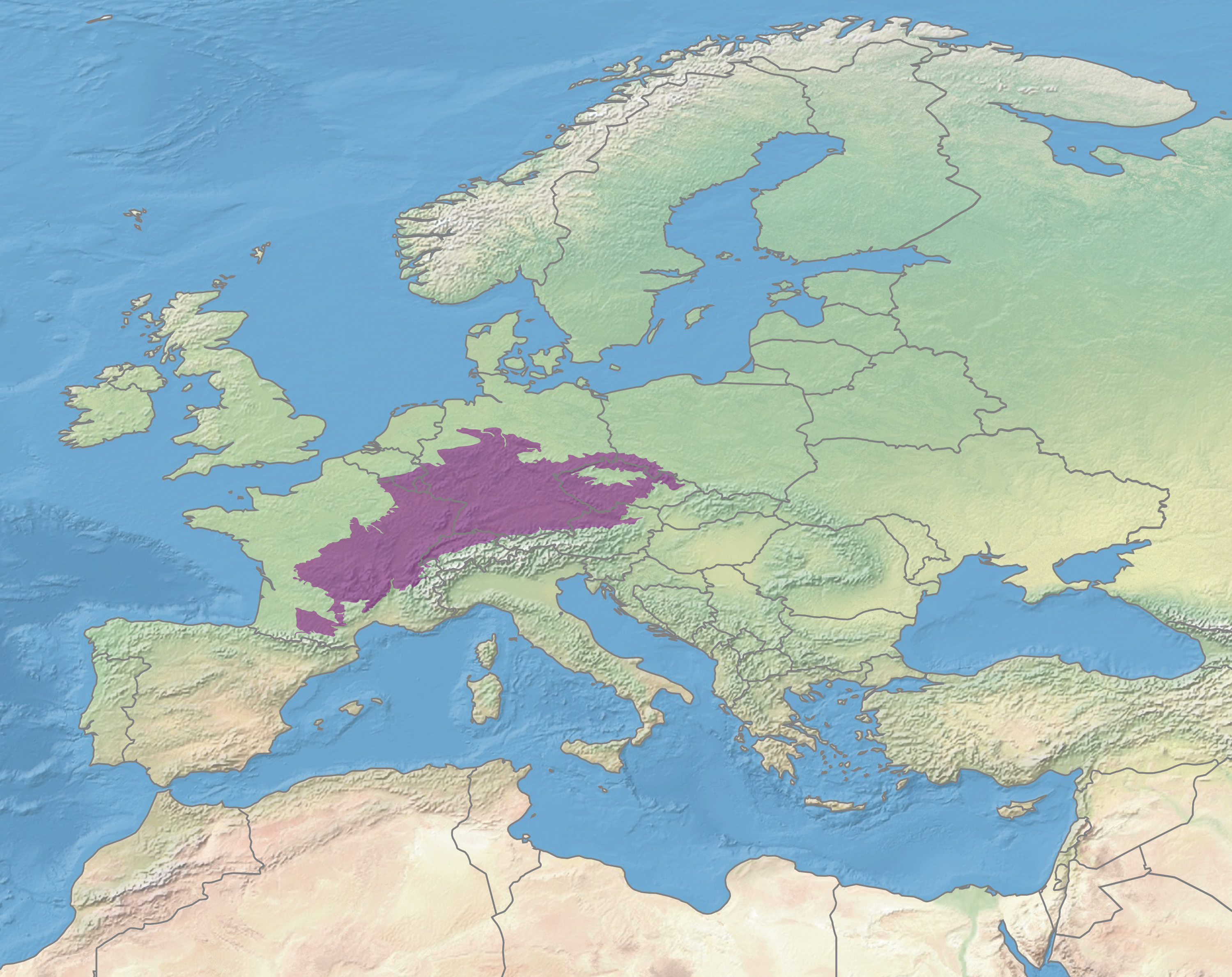
Western European broadleaf forests

Carpathian montane conifer forests

Poland is part of four terrestrial ecoregions, one freshwater ecoregion, and one marine ecoregion.

These ecoregions are defined by the World Wide Fund for Nature (WWF) and its partners, which include the European Environment Agency (EEA).

== Terrestrial ==
Poland is part of the Palearctic realm, one of the eight biogeographic realms that cover the Earth's land surface. Poland has a humid temperate climate, and falls within two terrestrial biomes, temperate broadleaf and mixed forests and temperate coniferous forests.

Most of Poland's natural vegetation is deciduous woodlands of the temperate broadleaf and mixed forests biome. Poland has three temperate broadleaf and mixed forest ecoregions:

- The Central European mixed forests ecoregion covers the largest portion of Poland, spanning from Lithuania to Romania, and from Germany to western Russia.
- Northwestern Poland is in the Baltic mixed forests ecoregion, which also includes the Baltic Sea coastal regions of northeastern Germany, eastern Denmark, and southern Sweden.
- The Western European broadleaf forests ecoregion extends into southwestern Poland (PA0445), covering the Polish portion of the Sudetes mountains.

The southeastern portion of Poland, lying in the Carpathian Mountains, is within the Carpathian montane conifer forests ecoregion, part of the temperate coniferous forests biome.

== Freshwater ==
Poland is part of the Central & Western Europe freshwater ecoregion. It encompasses the rivers and streams of western and central Europe between the North and Baltic seas to the north, and the Alps and Carpathian Mountains to the south.

== Marine ==
Poland's coastal waters are in the Baltic Sea marine ecoregion. It is part of the Temperate Northern Atlantic marine realm.

== The World Wide Fund for Nature in Poland ==
The WWF is an international non-governmental organization (NGO) working on issues regarding the conservation, research and protection of the environment. A branch of the World Wide Fund has operated in Poland since the early 1990s. In 1993, the WWF Polska succeeded in the creation of the Biebrza National Park followed in 1998 by the opening of its first permanent office in Białystok, which led to the creation of additional protected areas including Ujście Warty Landscape Park, Krzesin Landscape Park and the Muskau Park (Mużakowski Park Krajobrazowy, added to UNESCO World Heritage List in 2004). In 2000, the new permanent office in Warsaw became the headquarters of the foundation. An additional branch was set up in Wrocław which helped create the Ujście Warty National Park in 2001. The next year, WWF Poland petitioned the government into signing the Kyoto Protocol. In 2004 it organized a campaign against the illegal trade in endangered species resulting in new laws enacted by Polish Parliament, and in 2008 caused the cancellation of the Via Baltica expressway across the Rospuda valley. In recent years, WWF Polska volunteers removed the estimated 20 tons of abandoned nets from the Baltic sea, among numerous other projects.
