= Special Protection Areas in Poland =

Areas in Poland for birds

Special Protection Areas for birds in Poland are called OSOPs (Polish: Obszar Specjalnej Ochrony Ptaków). As of 2005, 72 OSOPs were designated.

Special Protection Areas for birds (OSOP) across Poland
Name in Polish and English	Code	Area in hectares	Voivodeship
Dolina Baryczy (Barycz Valley)	PLB020001	55516.8	dolnośląskie, wielkopolskie
Grądy Odrzańskie	PLB020002	20906.0	dolnośląskie, opolskie
Stawy Przemkowskie	PLB020003	4605.4	dolnośląskie, lubuskie
Błota Rakutowskie	PLB040001	4437.9	kujawsko-pomorskie
Bagienna Dolina Drwęcy (Drwęca Bog Valley)	PLB040002	3366.1	kujawsko-pomorskie
Dolina Dolnej Wisły (Lower Vistula Valley)	PLB040003	33559.0	kujawsko-pomorskie, pomorskie
Ostoja Nadgoplańska	PLB040004	9815.8	kujawsko-pomorskie, wielkopolskie
Bagno Bubnów	PLB060001	2187.6	lubelskie
Chełmskie Torfowiska Węglanowe	PLB060002	4309.4	lubelskie
Dolina Środkowego Bugu (Mid Bug River Valley)	PLB060003	28096.6	lubelskie
Dolina Tyśmienicy	PLB060004	7363.7	lubelskie
Lasy Janowskie (Janów Forests)	PLB060005	60235.8	lubelskie, podkarpackie
Lasy Parczewskie	PLB060006	14024.3	lubelskie
Lasy Strzeleckie	PLB060007	8749.5	lubelskie
Puszcza Solska (Solska Forest)	PLB060008	79349.1	lubelskie
Puszcza Barlinecka	PLB080001	26505.6	lubuskie, zachodniopomorskie
Ujście Warty (Warta River Mouth)	PLC080001	33215.0	lubelskie
Pradolina Warszawsko-Berlińska	PLB100001	23412.4	łódzkie, wielkopolskie
Gorce (within Gorce Mountains)	PLB120001	7658.6	małopolskie
Puszcza Niepołomicka (Niepołomice Forest)	PLB120002	11762.3	małopolskie
Tatry (Tatra Mountains)	PLC120001	21018.1	małopolskie
Dolina Dolnego Bugu (Lower Bug River Valley)	PLB140001	74309.9	mazowieckie, lubelskie, podlaskie
Dolina Liwca (Liwiec River Valley)	PLB140002	27431.5	mazowieckie, lubelskie
Dolina Pilicy (Pilica River Valley)	PLB140003	35356.3	mazowieckie, łódzkie
Dolina Środkowej Wisły (Mid Vistula Valley)	PLB140004	30777.9	mazowieckie, lubelskie
Doliny Omulwi i Płodownicy	PLB140005	34386.7	mazowieckie, warmińsko-mazurskie
Małopolski Przełom Wisły (Lesser Poland Vistula Valley)	PLB140006	6972.8	mazowieckie, lubelskie, świętokrzyskie
Puszcza Biała (White Forest)	PLB140007	83779.7	mazowieckie
Puszcza Kampinoska (Kampinos Forest)	PLC140001	37640.5	mazowieckie
Pogórze Przemyskie (Przemyskie Upland)	PLB180001	65390.2	podkarpackie
Bieszczady (Bieszczady Mountains)	PLC180001	111519.4	podkarpackie
Bagienna Dolina Narwi (Narew Bog Valley)	PLB200001	23147.1	podlaskie
Puszcza Augustowska (Augustów Primeval Forest)	PLB200002	134377.7	podlaskie
Puszcza Knyszyńska (Knyszyn Forest)	PLB200003	139590.2	podlaskie
Dolina Biebrzy	PLC200001	124104.5	podlaskie
Dolina Górnej Narwi (Upper Narew Valley)	PLC200002	15910.0	podlaskie
Przełomowa Dolina Narwi (Narew Ravine Valley)	PLC200003	6988.4	podlaskie
Puszcza Białowieska (Białowieża Forest)	PLC200004	63147.6	podlaskie
Wielki Sandr Brdy	PLB220001	37106.3	pomorskie
Dolina Słupi (Słupia Valley)	PLB220002	37471.8	pomorskie
Pobrzeże Słowińskie	PLB220003	21819.4	pomorskie
Ujście Wisły (Vistula River Delta)	PLB220004	1748.1	pomorskie, Baltic Sea
Zatoka Pucka (Bay of Puck)	PLB220005	62430.4	pomorskie, Baltic Sea
Dolina Górnej Wisły (Upper Vistula Valley)	PLB240001	24740.2	śląskie
Dolina Nidy (Nida River Valley)	PLB260001	19956.1	świętokrzyskie
Bagna Nietlickie	PLB280001	4080.8	warmińsko-mazurskie
Dolina Pasłęki (Pasłęka River Valley)	PLB280002	20669.9	warmińsko-mazurskie
Jezioro Łuknajno (Łuknajno Lake)	PLB280003	1380.3	warmińsko-mazurskie
Jezioro Oświn i Okolice (Oświn Seven Island Lake)	PLB280004	2501.6	warmińsko-mazurskie
Lasy Iławskie (Iława Lakeland Forests)	PLB280005	25218.5	warmińsko-mazurskie, pomorskie
Puszcza Borecka	PLB280006	116604.7	warmińsko-mazurskie
Puszcza Napiwodzko-Ramucka	PLB280007	116604.7	warmińsko-mazurskie
Puszcza Piska (Pisz Forest)	PLB280008	172802.2	warmińsko-mazurskie, mazowieckie, podlaskie
Warmińskie Bociany	PLB280009	107937.8	warmińsko-mazurskie
Zalew Wiślany (Vistula Lagoon)	PLB280010	32224.1	warmińsko-mazurskie, pomorskie, Zalew Wiślany
Jezioro Drużno (Drużno Lake)	PLC280001	3175.8	warmińsko-mazurskie
Dolina Środkowej Noteci i Kanału Bydgoskiego	PLB300001	32672.1	wielkopolskie | kujawsko-pomorskie
Dolina Środkowej Warty	PLB300002	57104.4	wielkopolskie
Nadnoteckie Łęgi	PLB300003	16058.1	wielkopolskie
Wielki Łęg Obrzański	PLB300004	7540.0	wielkopolskie
Zbiornik Wonieść	PLB300005	2802.1	wielkopolskie
Bagna Rozwarowskie	PLB320001	4249.7	zachodniopomorskie
Delta Świny	PLB320002	11008.5	zachodniopomorskie
Dolina Dolnej Odry (Lower Odra Valley)	PLB320003	61605.4	zachodniopomorskie, lubuskie
Jeziora Wełtyńskie (Wełtyń Lakes)	PLB320004	1306.2	zachodniopomorskie
Jezioro Miedwie i Okolice (Miedwie Lake and Area)	PLB320005	16511.0	zachodniopomorskie
Jezioro Świdwie (Świdwie Lake)	PLB320006	7196.2	zachodniopomorskie
Łąki Skoszewskie	PLB320007	9083.4	zachodniopomorskie
Ostoja Ińska	PLB320008	87710.9	zachodniopomorskie
Zalew Szczeciński (Szczecin Lagoon)	PLB320009	47194.6	zachodniopomorskie
Ławica Słupska	PLB990001	76594.0	Baltic Sea
Przybrzeżne Wody Bałtyku	PLB990002	194626.7	zachodniopomorskie, pomorskie, Baltic Sea
Zatoka Pomorska (Bay of Pomerania)	PLB990003	309154.9	zachodniopomorskie, Baltic Sea

== See also ==
- Natura 2000 in Poland
- Protected areas of Poland
