= Liw =

Liw or LIW can mean:

== Geography ==
- Liw, Poland, a village in Masovia
- Gmina Liw, an administrative district named after that village
- Liw, an alternative name for the Liwiec river

== People ==
- Daniel Liw, a Swedish bandy player

== LIW ==
- Levantine Intermediate Water, an oceanographic feature of the Mediterranean Sea
- Low-intensity warfare, alternate term for low-intensity conflict, small-scale military action
- LIW, IATA code for Loikaw Airport in Burma
- Lyttleton Ingeneurs Werke, former name of Denel Land Systems, a South African arms manufacturer
- Long instruction word, in computer science, see Very long instruction word

== See also ==
- Liu (surname)
