= Wiatrołuża (river) =

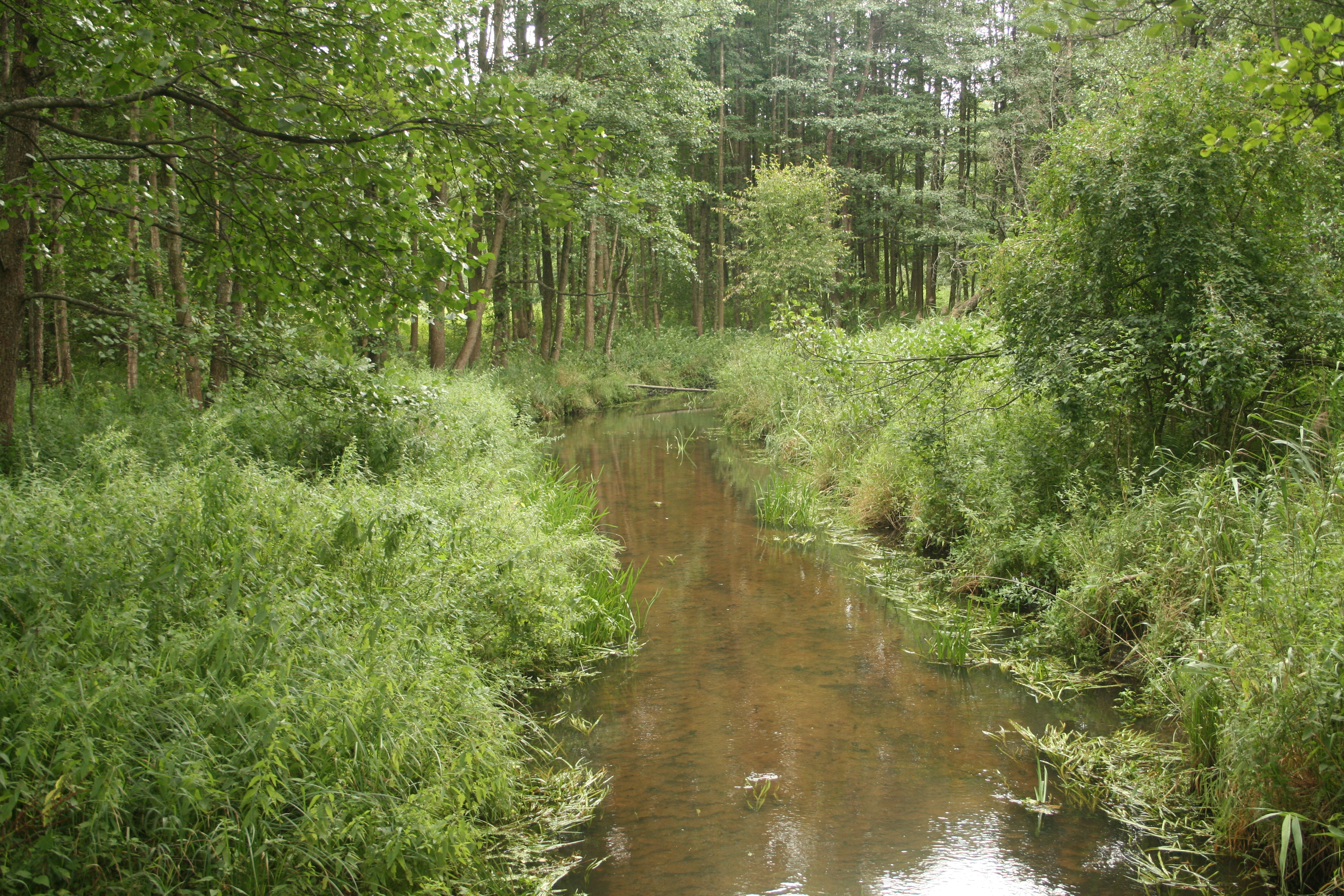
- Wiatrołuża as seen from a tourist trail in Wigry National Park

Location
- Country: Poland
- Voivodeship: Podlaskie
- County (Powiat): Suwałki

Physical characteristics
- Source
  - location: southeast of Pokomsze, Gmina Szypliszki
  - coordinates: 54°12′30″N 23°06′25″E
- Mouth: Lake Pierty
  - location: northern lakeshore, near Nowa Wieś, Gmina Suwałki
  - coordinates: 54.1107°N 23.0752°E
- Length: 10 km (6.2 mi)

Wiatrołuża is a river of northeastern Poland. It discharges into the lake Pierty, which is connected with Wigry Lake.
