= Warta Mouth Landscape Park =

Protected area in Poland

- Park Krajobrazowy Ujście Warty
- IUCN category V (protected landscape/seascape)
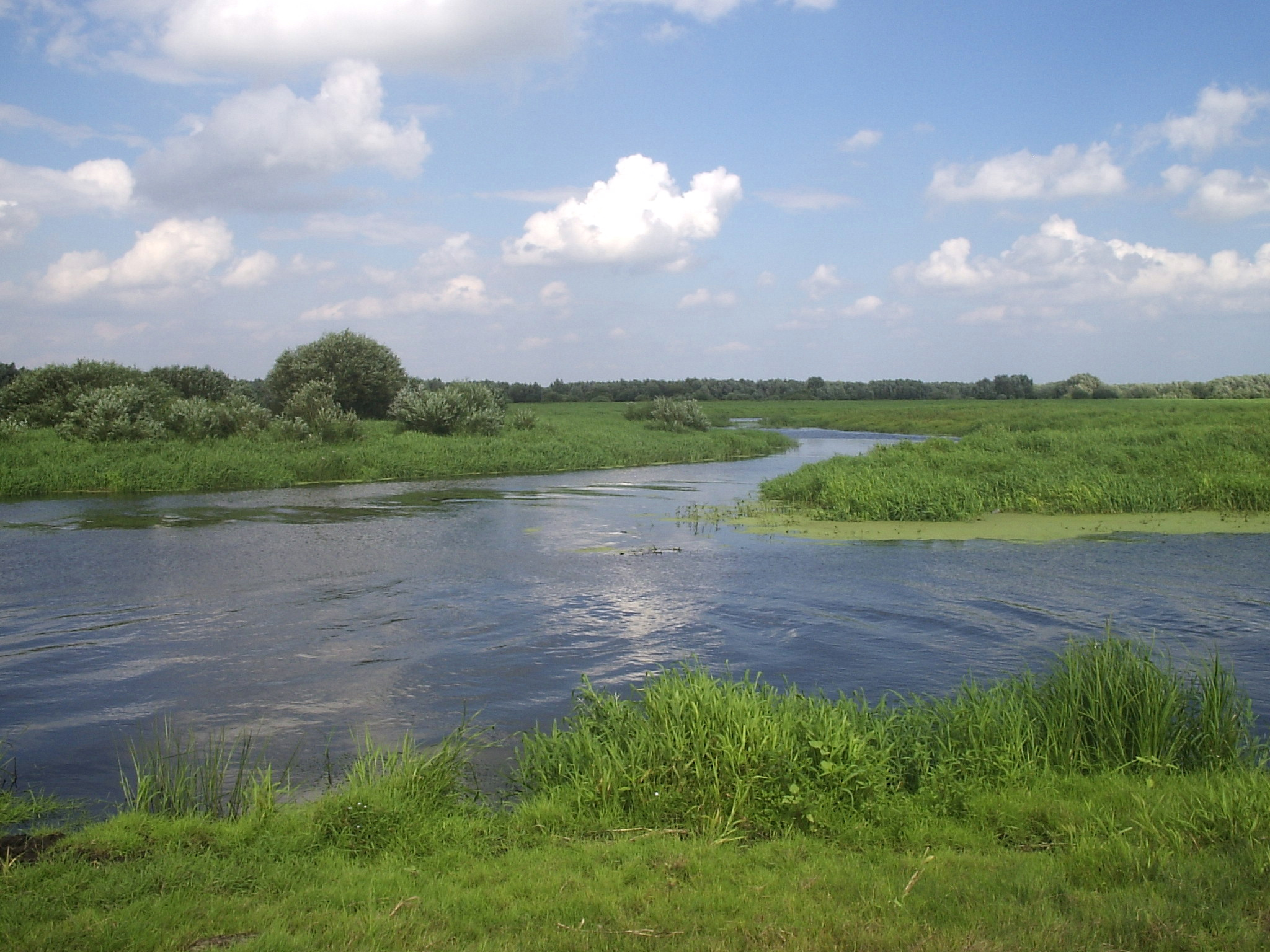
- Ujście Warty Scenic Park
- Interactive map of Warta Mouth Landscape Park
- Location: western Poland
- Coordinates: 52°40′N 14°28′E
- Established: 1996

Warta Mouth Landscape Park (Polish: Park Krajobrazowy Ujście Warty) is a protected area (a Landscape Park) in western Poland, along the lower stretches of the Warta river as it approaches its confluence with the Oder river. The Park was established in 1996.

The park is mostly within Lubusz Voivodeship, although it also extends northwards along the east bank of the Odra into West Pomeranian Voivodeship (Myślibórz County, Gmina Boleszkowice). It borders the Ujście Warty National Park, which was established in 2001 (formerly being part of the Landscape Park).

After the boundary adjustment, the area of the Warta Mouth Landscape Park is now 19,496.38 hectares, of which 17,697.89 hectares lie in Lubuskie Province and 1,798.49 hectares in Zachodniopomorskie Province.

== See also ==
- Special Protection Areas in Poland
