= Milicz Ponds =

- Stawy Milickie (Polish)
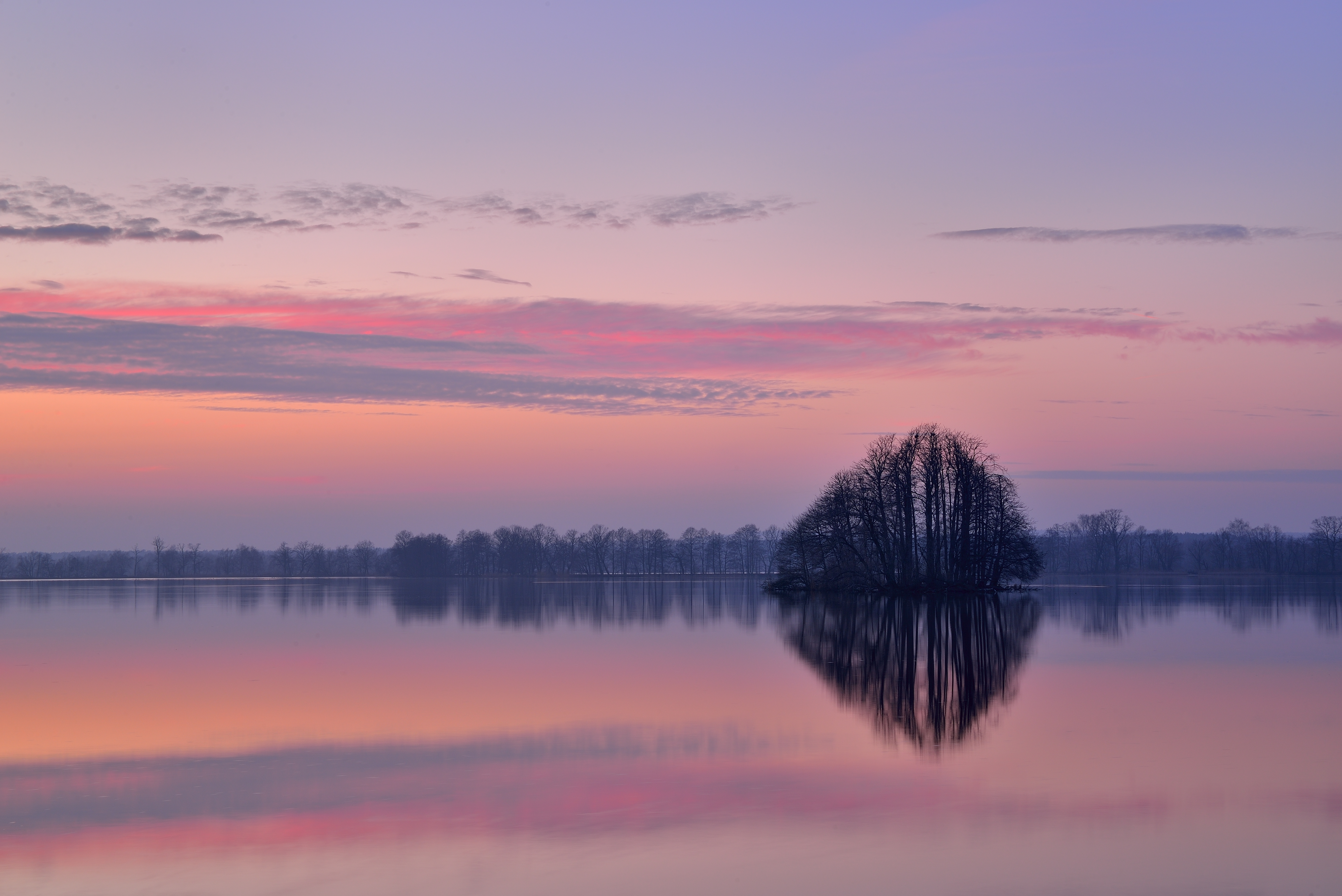
- Milicz Ponds Nature Reserve in Barycz Valley Landscape Park

- Location within Poland
- Location: Barycz Valley Landscape Park, Lower Silesian Voivodeship, Poland
- Coordinates: 51°30′14″N 17°06′34″E
- Type: Lake
- Surface area: 77 km^{2} (30 sq mi)

Designations

Ramsar Wetland
- Official name: Milicz Fishponds Nature Reserve
- Designated: 24 October 1995
- Reference no.: 758

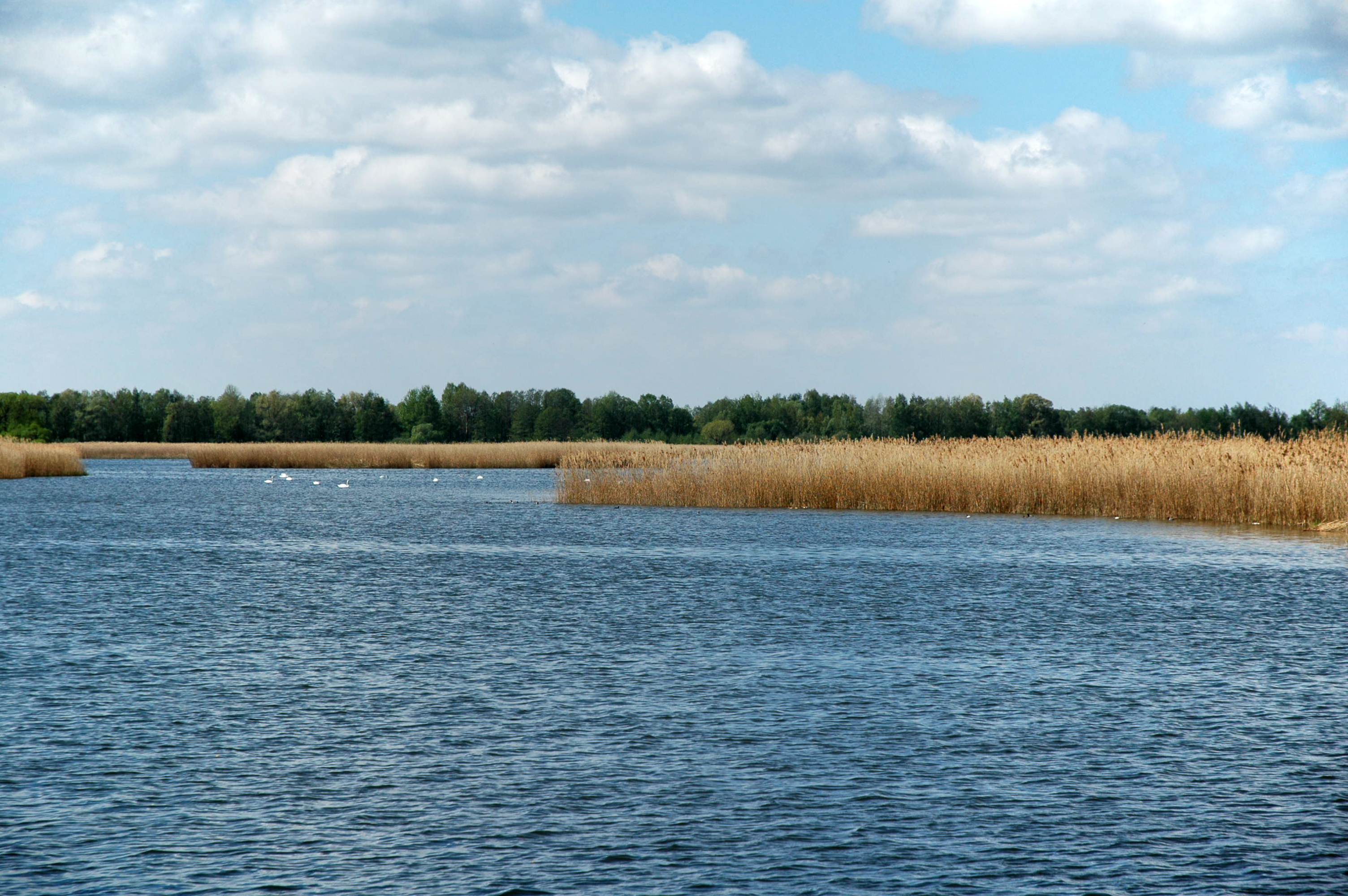
View of Słoneczny Górny pond

The Milicz Ponds (Polish: Stawy Milickie) are a group of about 285 fish ponds in Lower Silesian Voivodeship, south-western Poland, in the valley of the river Barycz, close to the towns of Milicz and Żmigród. The ponds cover a total area of about 77 square kilometres (30 sq mi).

Due to their importance as a habitat and breeding ground for water birds since the 1200s, the ponds are a nature reserve (established 1963, area 53 square kilometres (20 sq mi)), which is protected under the Ramsar convention (one of 13 such sites in Poland). Since 1996 it has also formed part of the larger protected area known as the Barycz Valley Landscape Park.
