= Seven Island Lake Nature Reserve =

Nature reserve in Poland

- Rezerwat przyrody Jezioro Siedmiu Wysp
- IUCN category IV (habitat/species management area)
- Interactive map of Seven Island Lake Nature Reserve
- Location: Warmian-Masurian Voivodeship, Poland
- Coordinates: 54°18′N 21°34′E
- Area: 10.06 km^{2} (2,490 acres)
- Established: 1956

Ramsar Wetland
- Official name: Lake of Seven Islands Nature Reserve
- Designated: 3 January 1984
- Reference no.: 285

Seven Island Lake Nature Reserve (Polish: Rezerwat przyrody Jezioro Siedmiu Wysp) is a nature reserve established in 1956 around Oświn Lake in north-eastern Poland, close to the border with the Kaliningrad Oblast of Russia.

== Geography ==
The reserve is located within Warmian-Masurian Voivodeship, in Gmina Węgorzewo of Węgorzewo County.

The area is an important breeding ground for water birds, and is both a Natura 2000 EU Special Protection Area, and a Ramsar site − one of 13 such sites in Poland.

The reserve covers an area of approximately 10 square kilometres (3.9 sq mi), consisting of about 3.5 km² of water bodies, 6 km² of marshland and 0.5 km² of forest.

== See also ==
- Nature reserves in Poland
- Natura 2000 in Poland
- Ramsar sites in Poland
- Special Protection Areas in Poland
