= Świdwie =

Lake in Poland

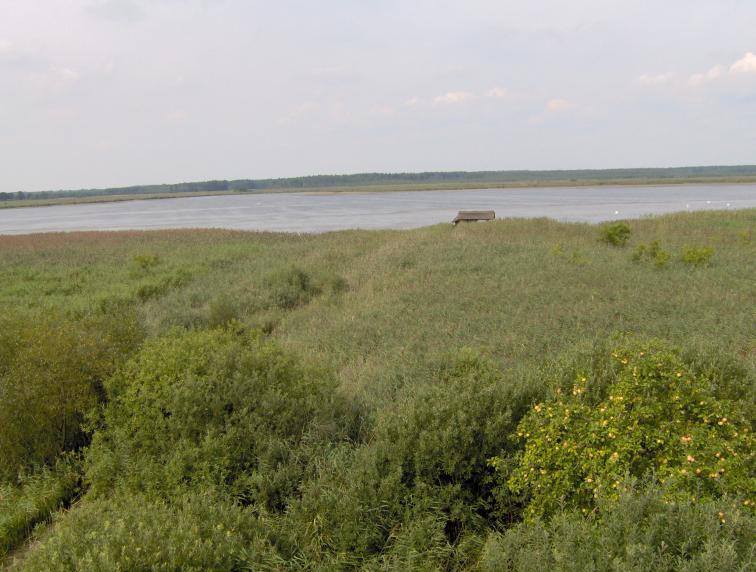

- Location within West Pomeranian Voivodeship
- Coordinates: 53°33′33″N 14°22′25″E
- Basin countries: Poland
- Surface area: 8.9 km^{2} (3.4 sq mi)

Ramsar Wetland
- Official name: Swidwie Lake Nature Reserve
- Designated: 3 January 1984
- Reference no.: 283

Świdwie [ˈɕfidvjɛ] (German: Neuendorfer See) is a lake in north-western Poland, and is the site of a nature reserve and a Ramsar site (one of 13 such sites in Poland).

The lake is situated in West Pomeranian Voivodeship (in Police County) at the edge of the Wkrzańska Forest. It has an area of approximately 8.9 square kilometres (3.4 sq mi). It lies on the Gunica River.

It is also a Natura 2000 EU Special Protection Area.

== See also ==
- Natura 2000 in Poland
- Ramsar sites in Poland
- Special Protection Areas in Poland
