= Liwiec =

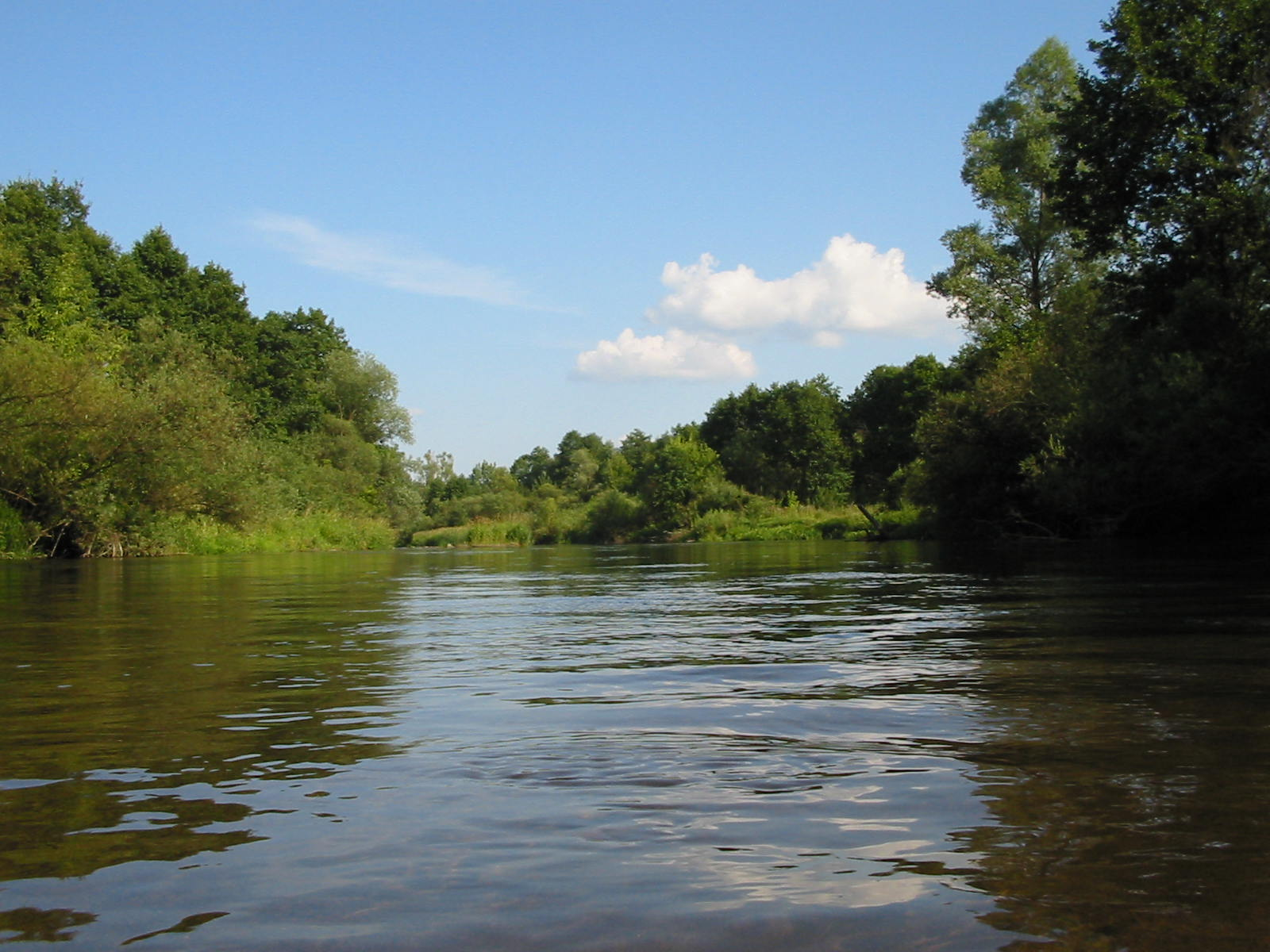
- Liwiec near Kamieńczyk

Location
- Country: Poland

Physical characteristics
- Mouth
  - location: Bug
  - coordinates: 52°36′04″N 21°33′30″E
- Length: 142 km (88 mi)
- Basin size: 2,763 km^{2} (1,067 sq mi)
- Discharge
  - average: 12.1 m^{3}/s (430 cu ft/s)

Basin features
- Progression: Bug→ Narew→ Vistula→ Baltic Sea

The Liwiec (or Liw, pronounced /Livjɛt͡s/ or /Liv/ ) is a river in Poland, and a tributary of the Bug River.

== Course ==
The Liwiec flows in the plains of Southern Podlaskie Voivodeship and central Masovian Voivodeship. It is 142 kilometres long and drains 2,763 square kilometres of watershed.

The source of the Liwiec is located to the north-west of Międzyrzec Podlaski near Siedlce and crosses Wyszków, Liw, Węgrów, and Stara Wieś.

Its lower estuary and confluence with the Bug River is located near the towns of Wyszków and Kamieńczyk.

It has a Natura 2000 EU Special Protection Area region.

== Gallery ==
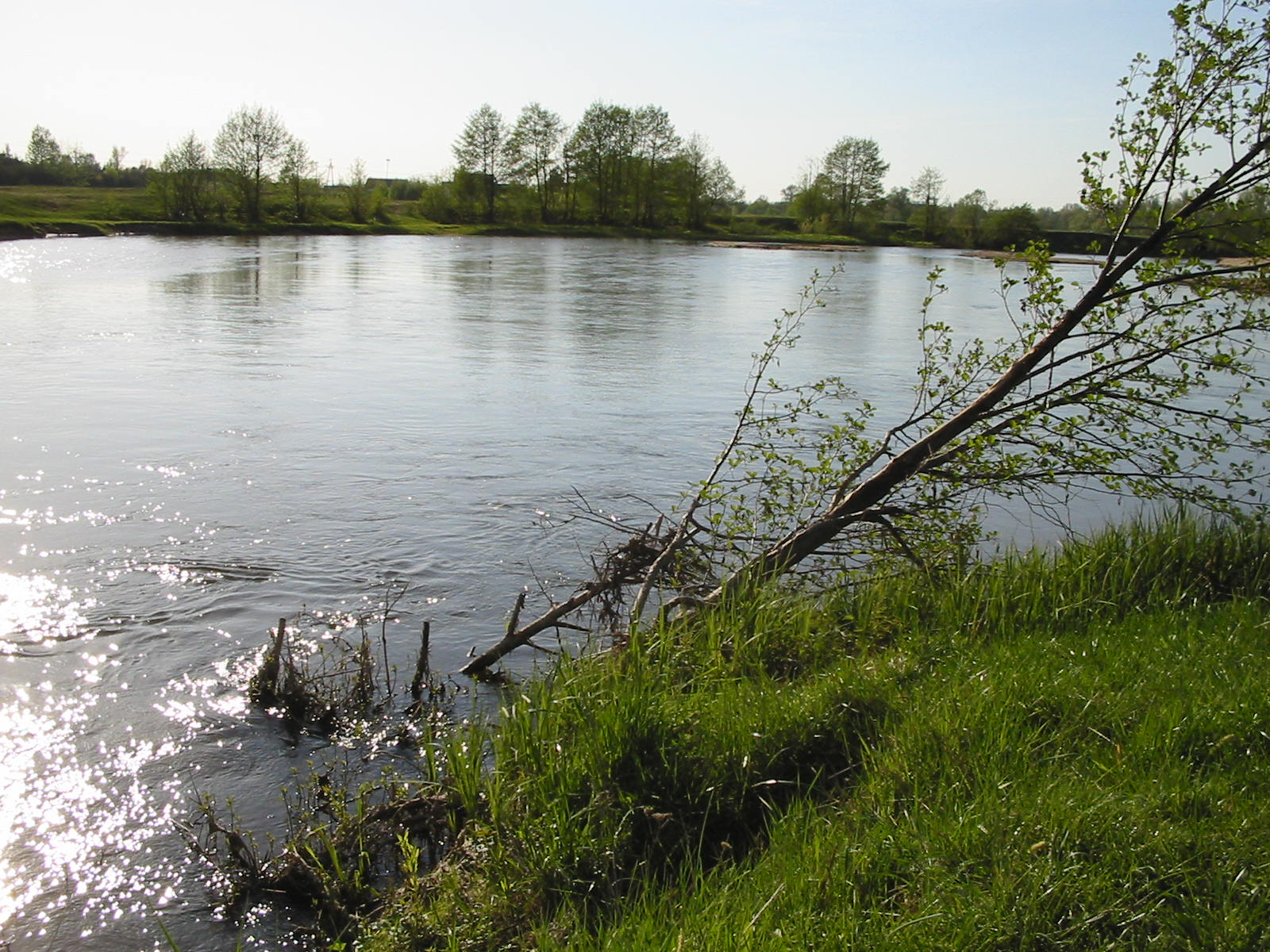
Liwiec−Liw river.

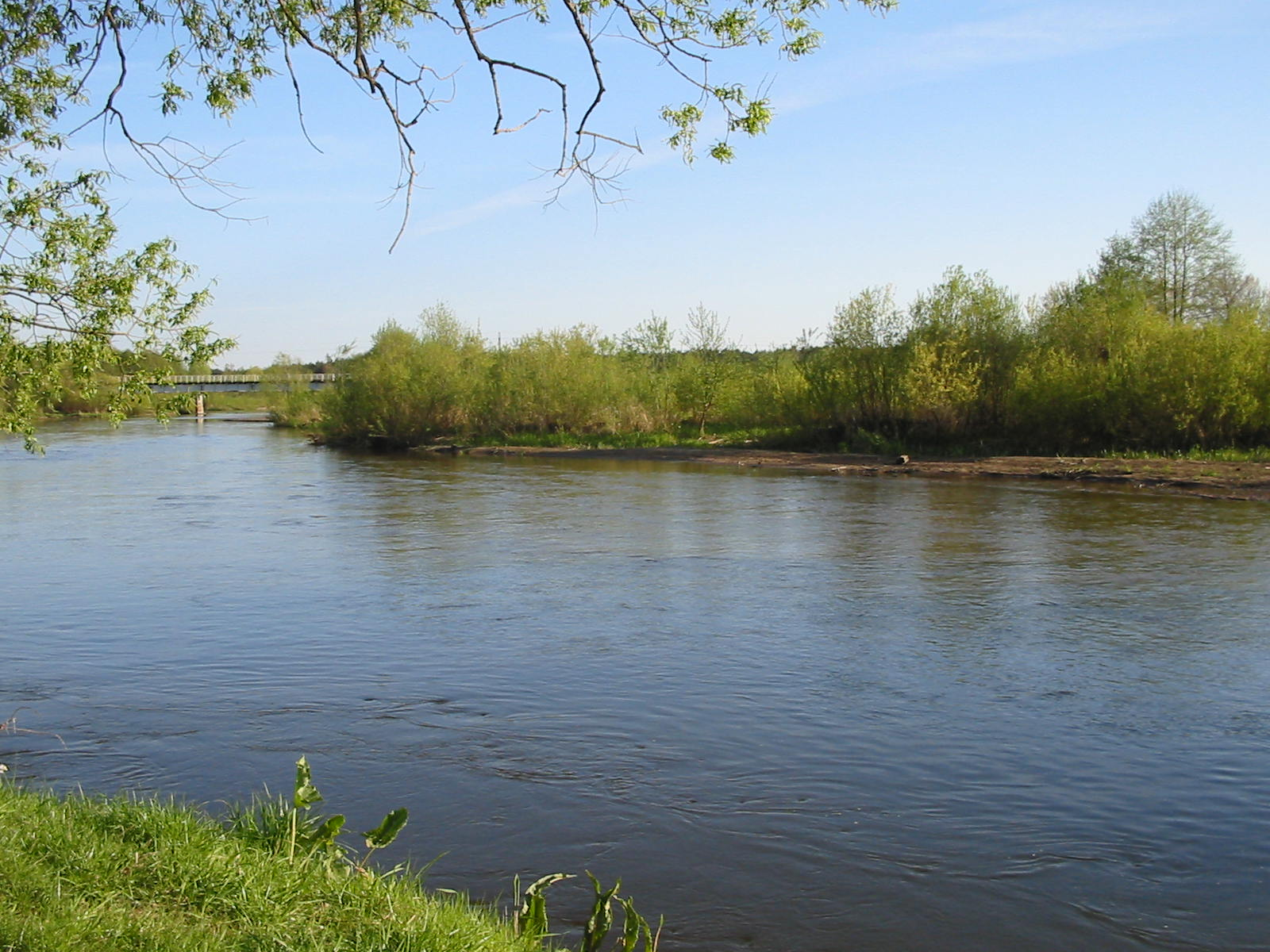
Liwiec near Kamieńczyk.

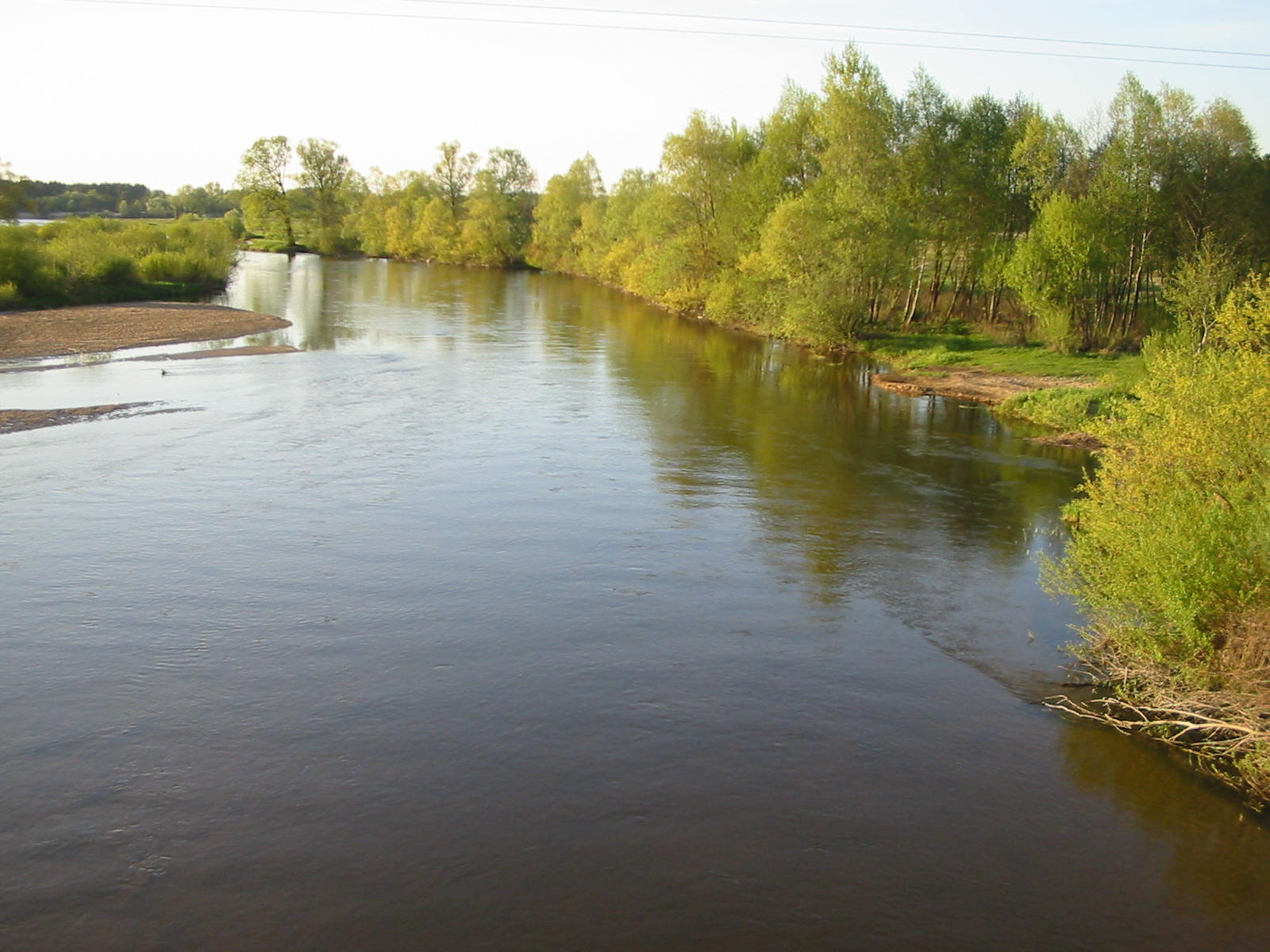
Liwiec near the estuary.

== See also ==
- Rivers of Poland
- Special Protection Areas in Poland
- Natura 2000 in Poland
