= Wigry Lake =

Lake in Poland

Wigry
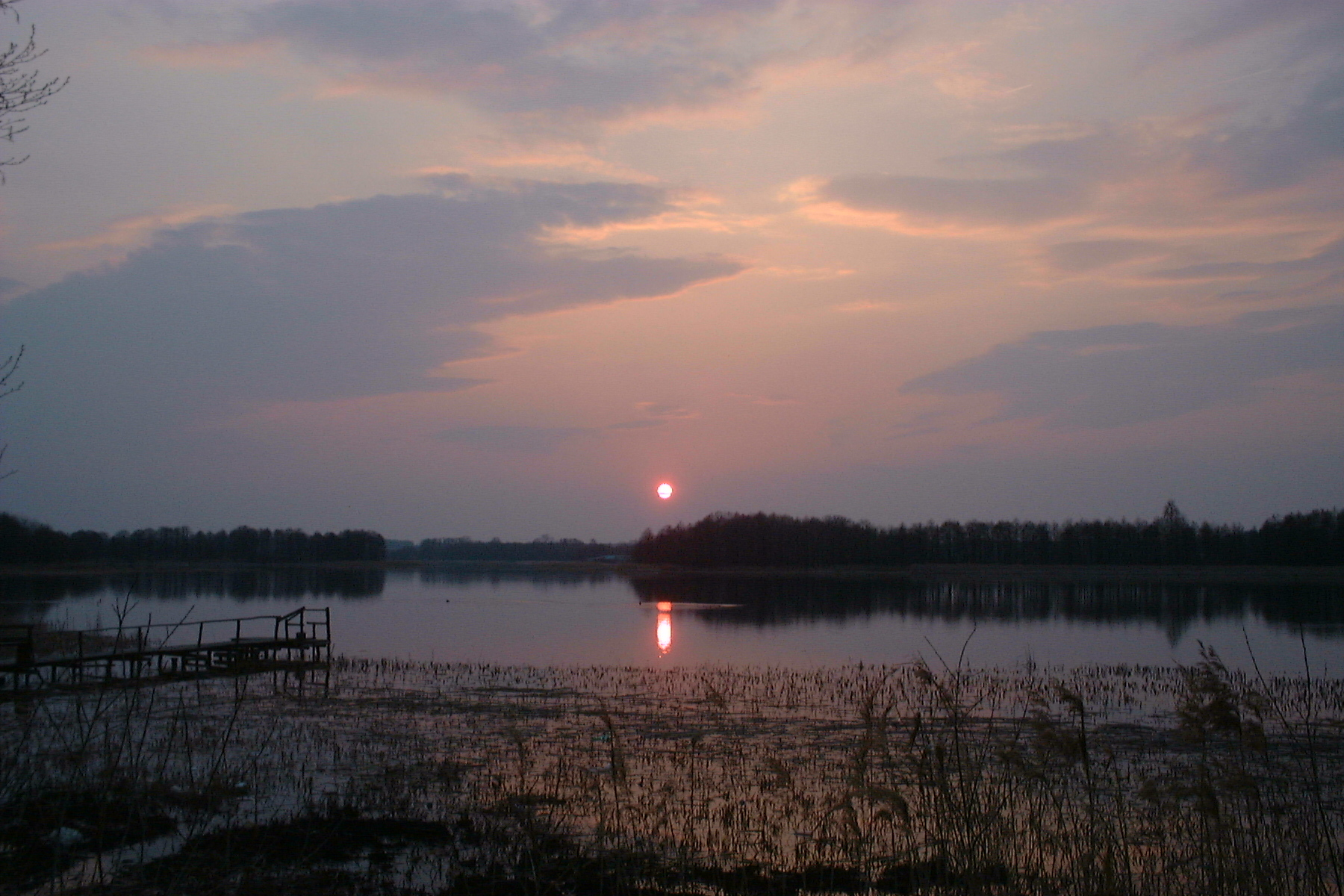
- Sunset over the lake

- Location within Poland
- Location: Podlaskie Voivodship
- Coordinates: 54°2′12″N 23°5′54″E
- Basin countries: Poland
- Max. width: 2,750 m (9,020 ft)
- Surface area: 21.7 km^{2} (8.4 sq mi)
- Average depth: 15.4 m (51 ft)
- Max. depth: 73 m (240 ft)
- Islands: 19

Wigry is a lake located in north-eastern Poland, in Podlaskie Voivodeship.

Wigry lake is situated in the forests of the Augustów Wilderness – trees grow on about 80% of its shoreline. There are 19 smaller and bigger islands on the lake, in its waters thrive as many as 26 species of fish, including pike, trout and bass. The maximum depth of the lake is 73 meters. The lake and its adjacent area belong to the Wigry National Park which means there are several regulations which ought to be respected by tourists. Wigry is considered a "zone of silence", which bans the use of anyone except law enforcement from using motorboats on the lake. Tents and bonfires are allowed only in designated areas.

The lake is revered by canoeing and yachting aficionados. Wigry, as well as the Czarna Hańcza River, are part of a famous canoe trail of John Paul II.

Wigry is also the name of a Polish youth bicycle popular in the 1970s and the 1980s, as well as the name of a Polish 3rd Division soccer team – Wigry Suwałki.

== See also ==
- Augustów Canal
- Wiatrołuża (river)
