= Wigry National Park =

National park in Poland

Coordinates: 54°00′N 23°03′E

- Polish: Wigierski Park Narodowy
- IUCN category II (national park)
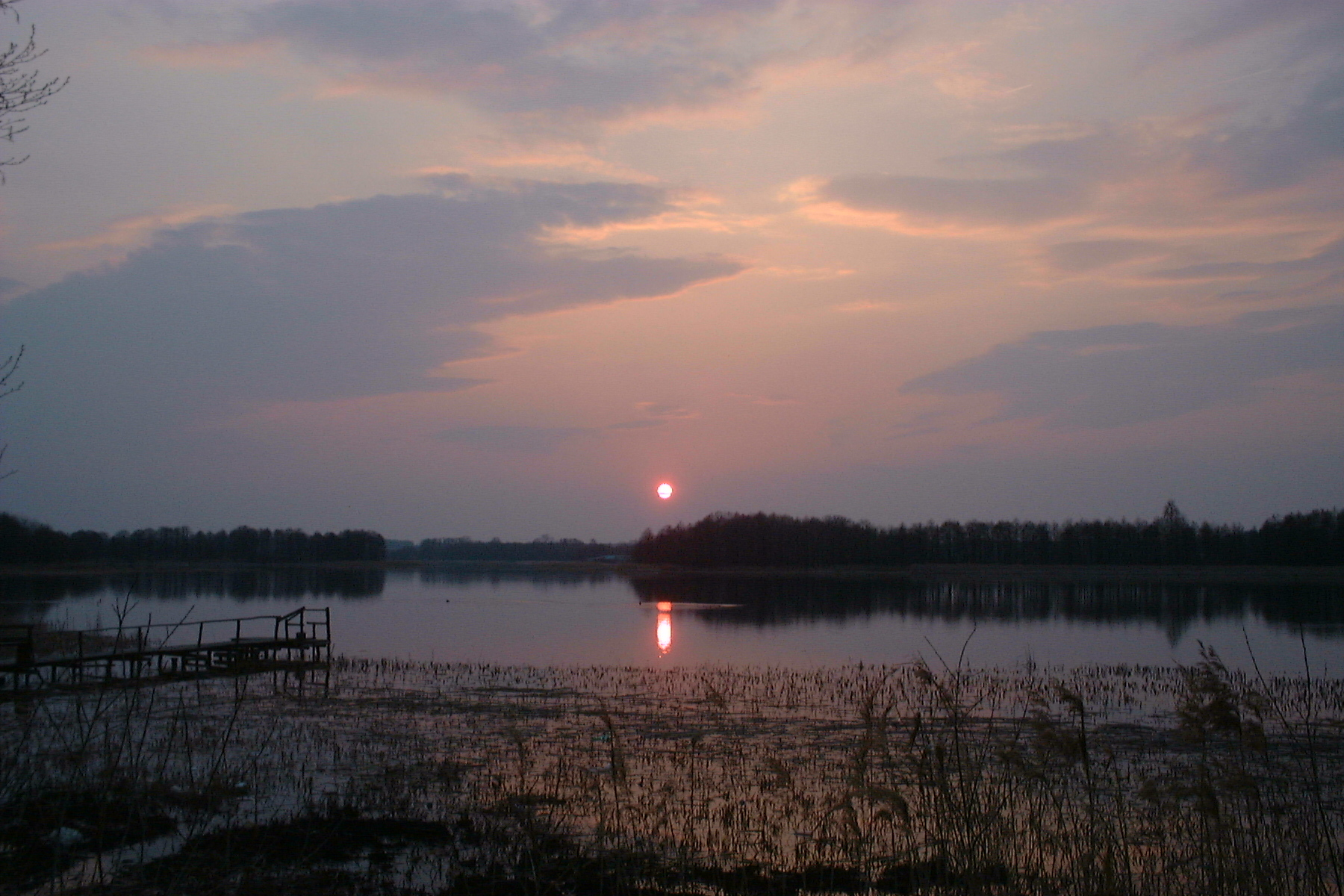
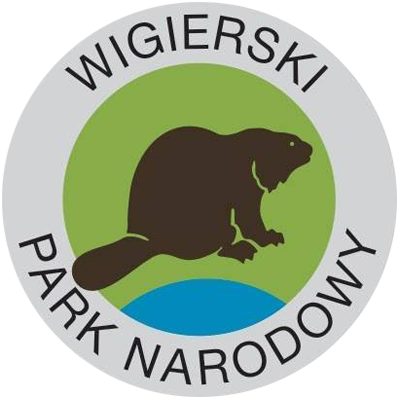
- Wigry Lake at sunset Park logo with Eurasian beaver

- Location within Poland
- Location: Podlaskie Voivodeship, Poland
- Nearest city: Suwałki
- Area: 150.86 km^{2} (58.25 sq mi)
- Established: 1989
- Governing body: Ministry of the Environment
- Website: Official website

Ramsar Wetland
- Official name: Wigry National Park
- Designated: 29 October 2002
- Reference no.: 1567

Wigry National Park (Polish: Wigierski Park Narodowy) is a national park in Podlaskie Voivodeship in northeastern Poland. It covers parts of the Masurian Lake District and Augustów Primeval Forest (Puszcza Augustowska). It is named after Lake Wigry, the largest of the park's many lakes. It is also designated as a Ramsar wetland site, one of 13 such sites in Poland.

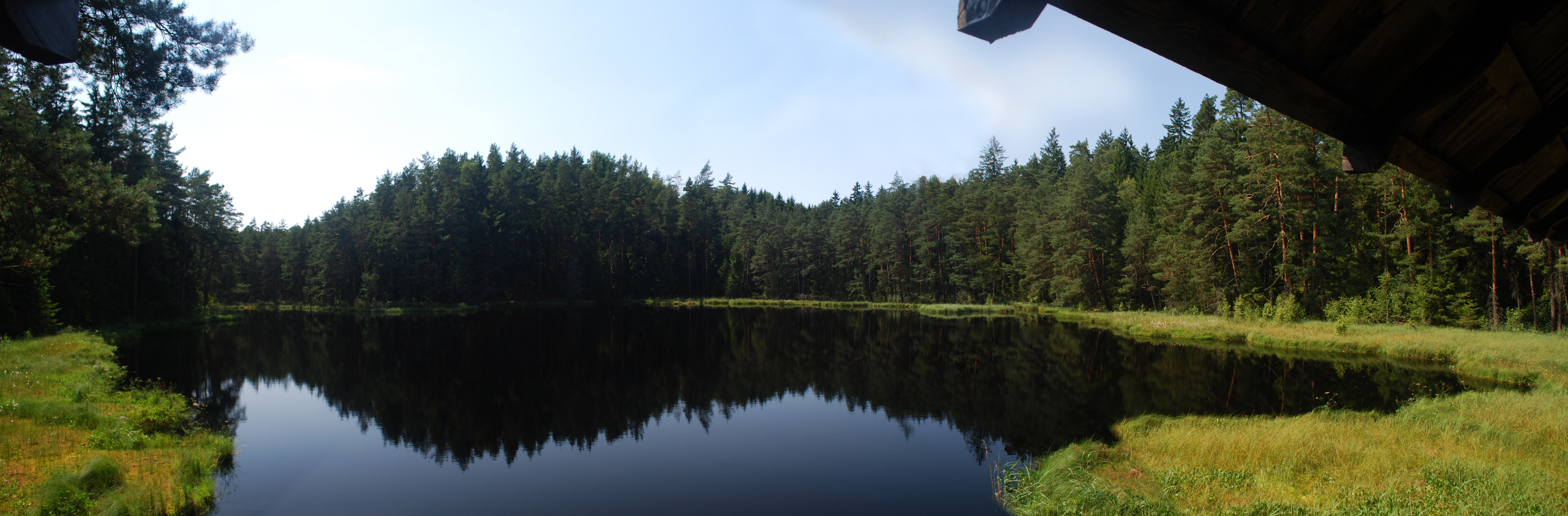
Panorama of the park

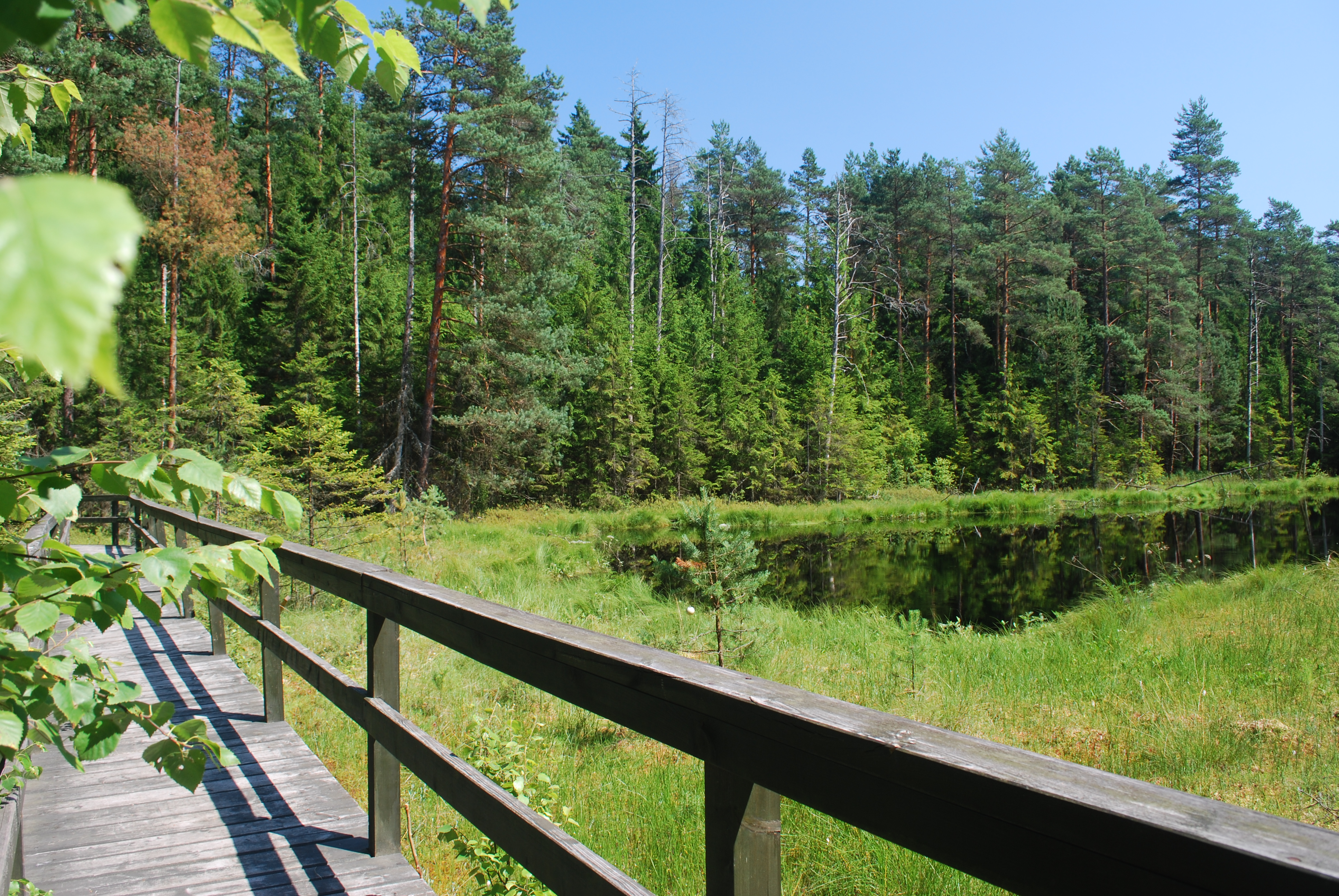
Footbridge over the swamp and Suchar

The park was created on January 1, 1989, on an area of 149.56 km^{2}. Today it is slightly larger at 150.86 km^{2} (58.25 sq mi), of which 94.64 km^{2} is forest, 29.08 km^{2} is water, and 27.14 km^{2} is other types of land, mostly agricultural. Strictly protected zones account for 6.23 km^{2}, including 2.83 km^{2} of woods. The park has its headquarters in the town of Suwałki.

The park's landscape was to a large extent shaped by a glacier which covered this region around 12,000 years ago. While slowly receding to the north, the glacier formed valleys, many of which are filled with water in the form of lakes. Some of the shallowest lakes have in the course of time become peat-bogs. The northern part of the park is hilly, with elevation reaching 180 meters above sea level. The southern part is flat and is mainly covered with a forest, which is part of the broader Puszcza Augustowska.

The park is famous for its numerous lakes of different shape, size, and depth. Altogether, there are 42 of them, the biggest, Wigry, covering an area of 21.87 km^{2} with a maximum depth of 73 meters, is located in the central part of the park. The main river is Czarna Hańcza, which crosses Lake Wigry, and forms a popular kayaking route.

== History ==
The first attempts to protect the nature of Lake Wigry and its surrounding area were undertaken in the 1920s – first by Kazimierz Kulwieć and later by the botanist Bolesław Hryniewiecki and the limnologist Alfred Lityński – but never came to fruition. Their activities, however, led to the creation of a hydrobiological station on the shores of the lake in Płociczno. It was active until the outbreak of World War II in 1939. The first protected area, a partial reserve named "Wigry", was established in 1931. Two other reserves, "Ostoja Bobrów Stary Folwark" (Stary Folwark Beavers' Refuge) and "Ostoja Bobrów Zakąty" (Zakąty Beavers' Refuge), were established in 1959 and 1962 in order to protect beavers. In 1970, Lake Wądołek and a fragment of an adjacent forest became the first strict nature reserve in the area. In 1975, International Union for Conservation of Nature (IUCN) placed Lake Wigry on its list of the most valuable water reservoirs in the world (Project "Aqua").

Lobbying for the further protection of Lake Wigry eventually resulted in the establishment of Wigry Landscape Park in 1976, which covered an area of nearly 11,000 ha. Shortly after the establishment of the landscape park, work aiming at designation of a national park began, eventually resulting in the government's decision to designate Wigry National Park in June 1988, with an area of 14,840 ha. The park officially began its activity on January 1, 1989. In 1997, the area was increased to 15,085 ha.

In 2002, Wigry National Park was inscribed on the Ramsar Convention list of wetlands of international importance. It became a part of the Natura 2000 network in 2004.

== Wildlife ==
=== Animals ===
Over 1,700 animal species have been found in the park, including 46 species of mammals, 202 species of birds, 12 species of amphibians and 5 species of reptiles. The most characteristic animal living in the park is Eurasian beaver, numerous in lakes and rivers. Currently there are around 250 beavers there. Also, the park is known to have wolves. In the park's waters thrive 32 species of fish. For some animals, Wigry National Park is the only place to live. 289 species are protected by law and 128 of them have been placed on the Red List of Endangered Species in Poland.

=== Plants ===
Interesting is the fact that in the park there is not a single specimen of beech tree. On the other hand, predominant tree type is the fir which is present in all forests. The park's area is to a large extent covered by peat bogs, which are in some places of pristine character.

== Tourism ==
Northeastern Poland, including the park itself, is an attractive region for tourism, especially in the summertime. There are more than 190 kilometres of tourist trails in the park. Fishing anglers as well as sailboats take advantage of the biggest lakes including Wigry, Pierty, Leszczewek and Mulaczysko.

The places of interest include a former monastery, where an artist residency belonging to the Ministry of Culture is located.

== See also ==
- Augustów Canal
