= Barycz Valley Landscape Park =

Protected area in Poland

Coordinates: 51°27′40″N 17°09′41″E

- Park Krajobrazowy Dolina Baryczy
- IUCN category V (protected landscape/seascape)
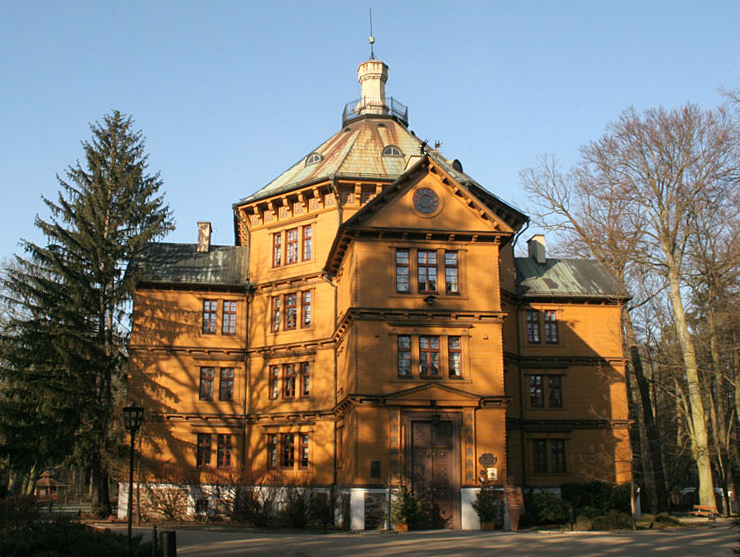
- Radziwiłł residence
- Interactive map of Barycz Valley Landscape Park
- Location: south-west Poland
- Area: 870.4 km^{2} (336.1 sq mi)
- Established: 1996

Barycz Valley Landscape Park (Park Krajobrazowy Dolina Baryczy) is a protected area (Landscape Park) in south-western Poland. Established in 1996, it covers an area of 870.4 square kilometres (336.1 sq mi).

The park is shared between two voivodeships: Lower Silesian Voivodeship and Greater Poland Voivodeship. Within Lower Silesian Voivodeship it lies in Milicz County (Gmina Milicz, Gmina Cieszków, Gmina Krośnice), Oleśnica County (Gmina Twardogóra) and Trzebnica County (Gmina Trzebnica, Gmina Prusice, Gmina Żmigród). Within Greater Poland Voivodeship, it lies in Ostrów County (Gmina Odolanów, Gmina Przygodzice, Gmina Sośnie).

The park includes the Milicz Ponds (Stawy Milickie) nature reserve, which is a protected Ramsar wetland site.

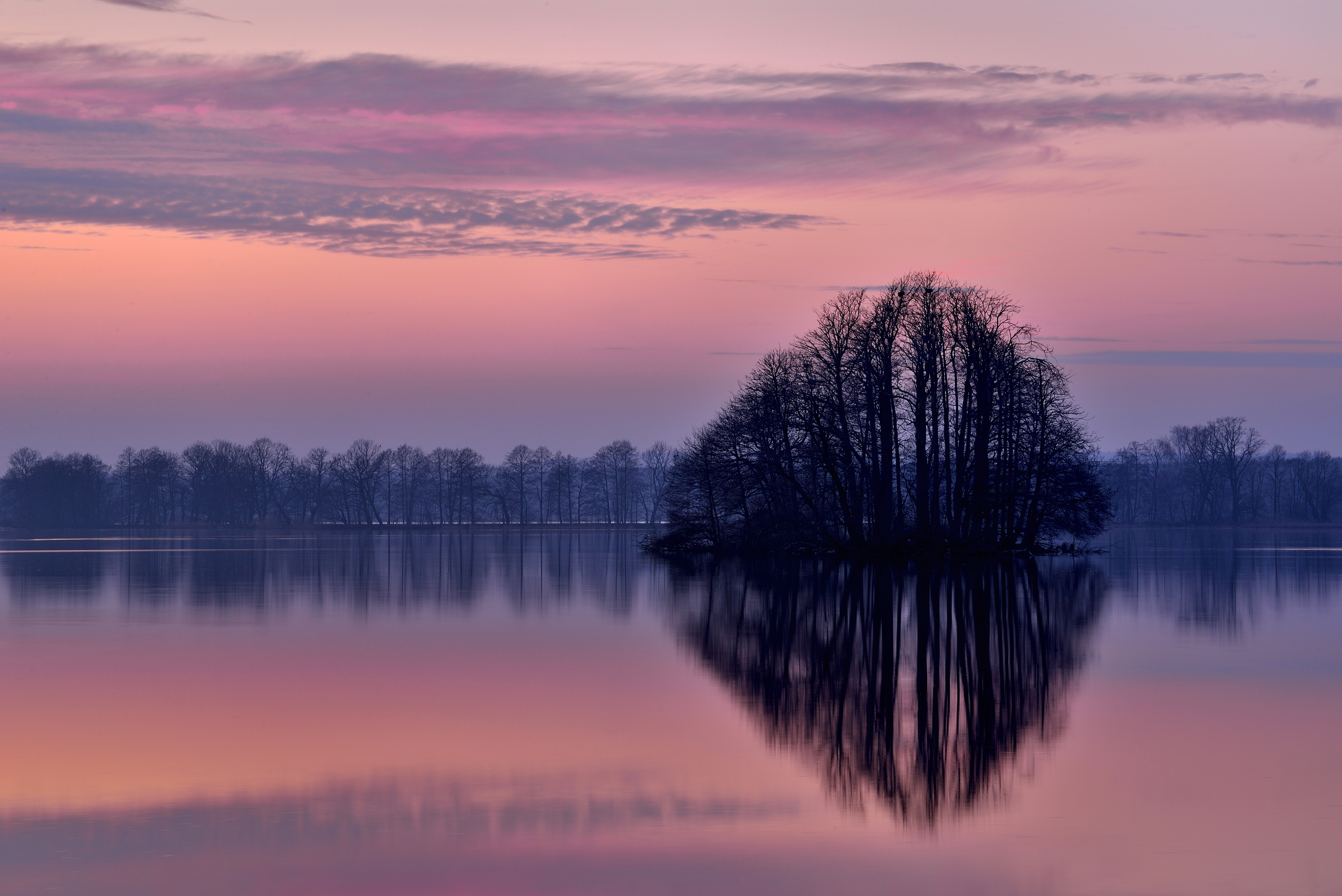

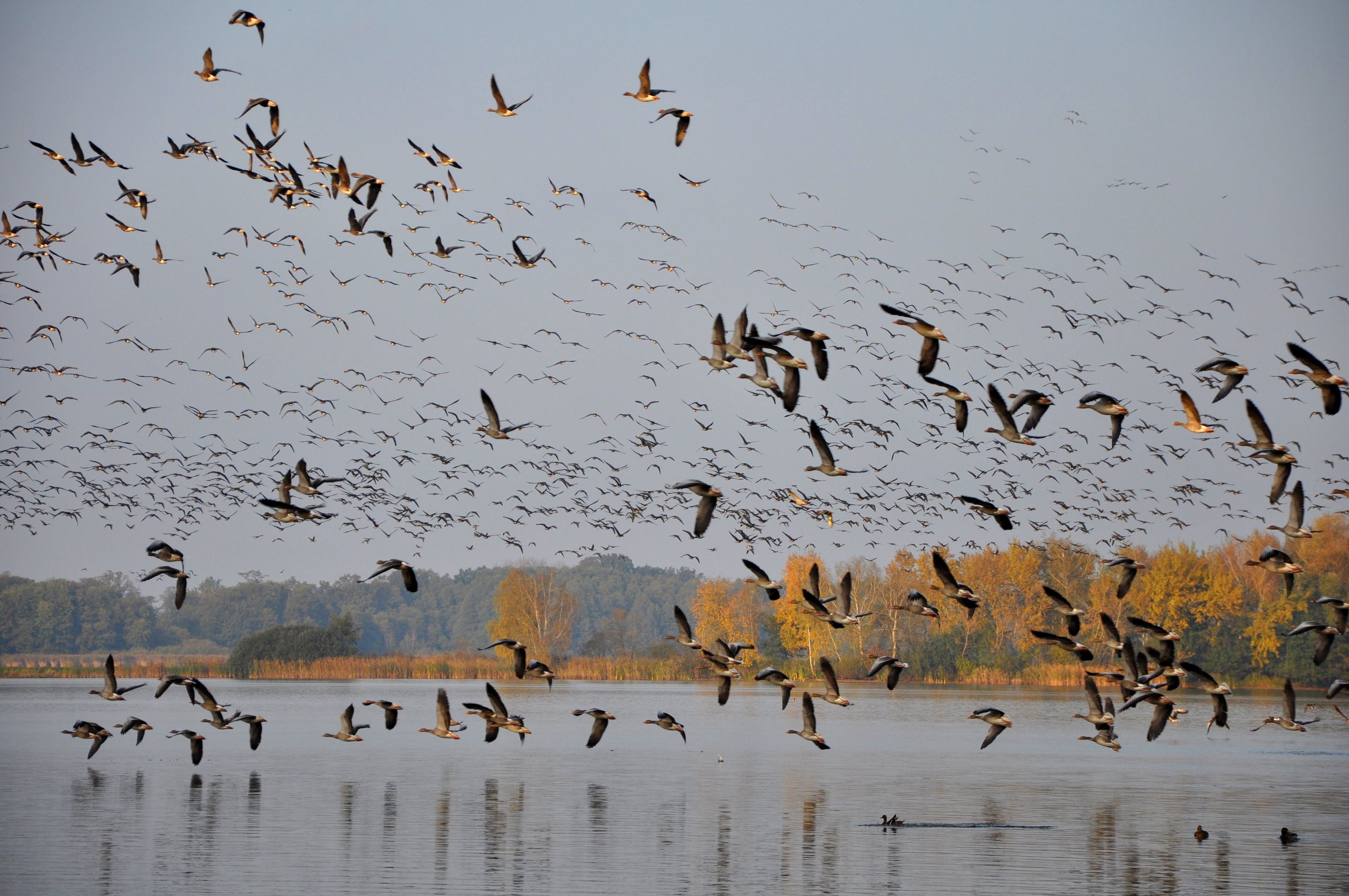

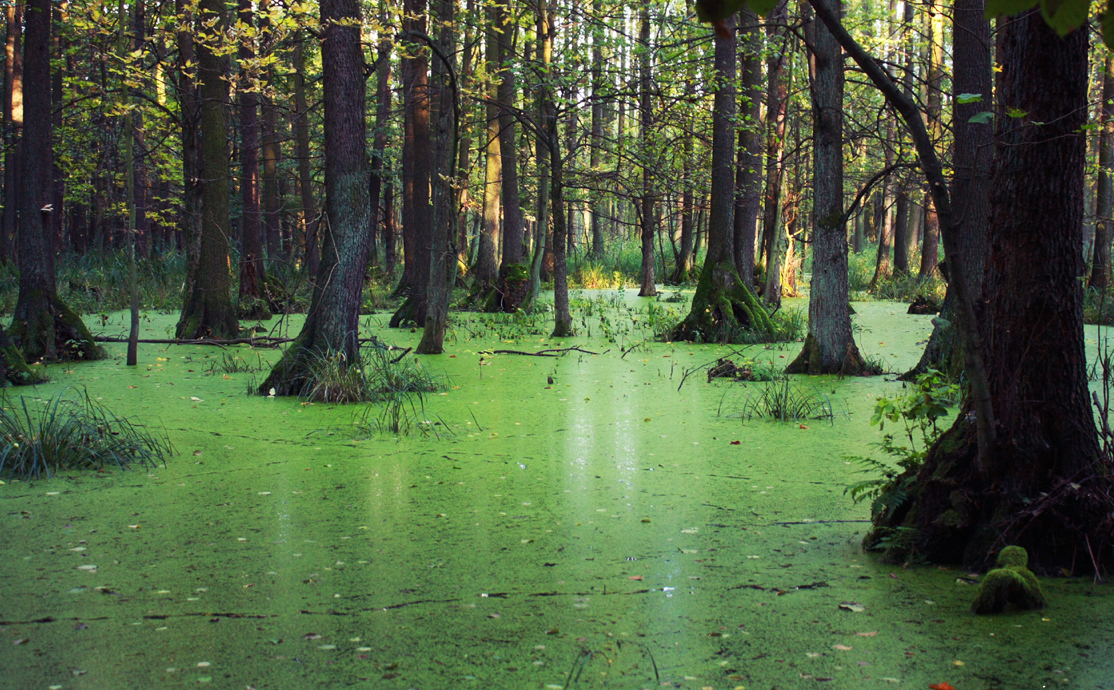

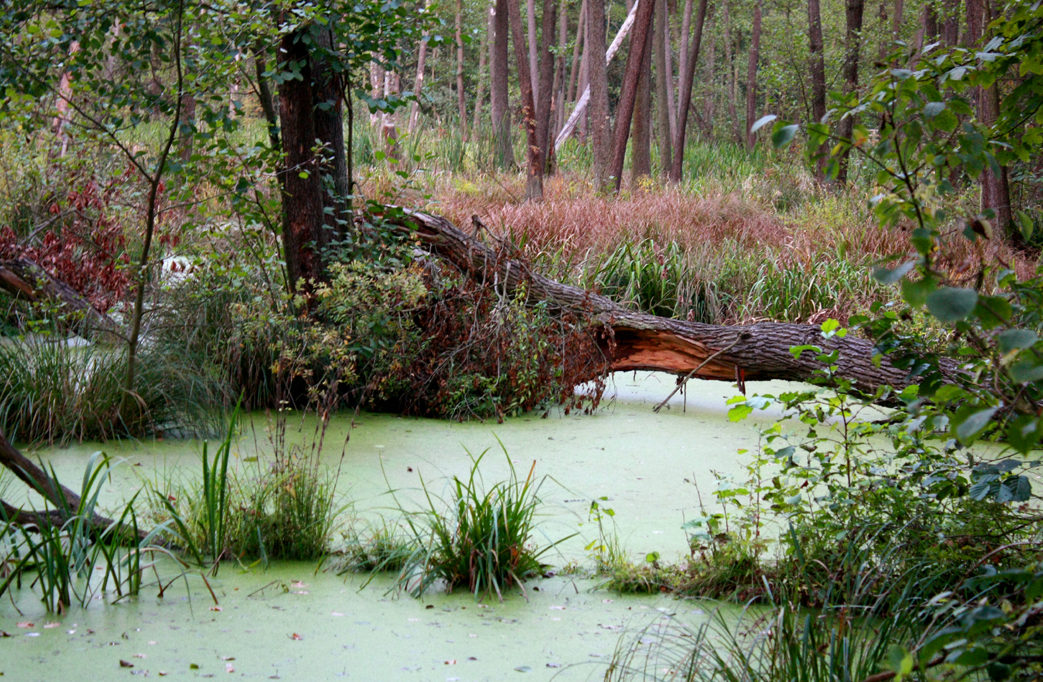

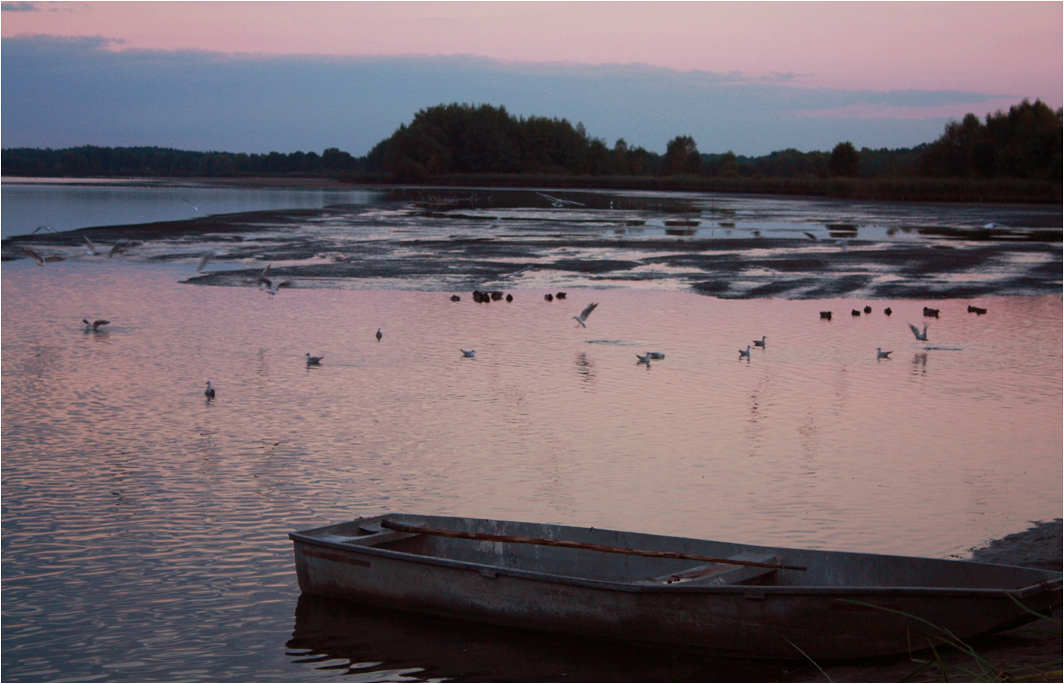

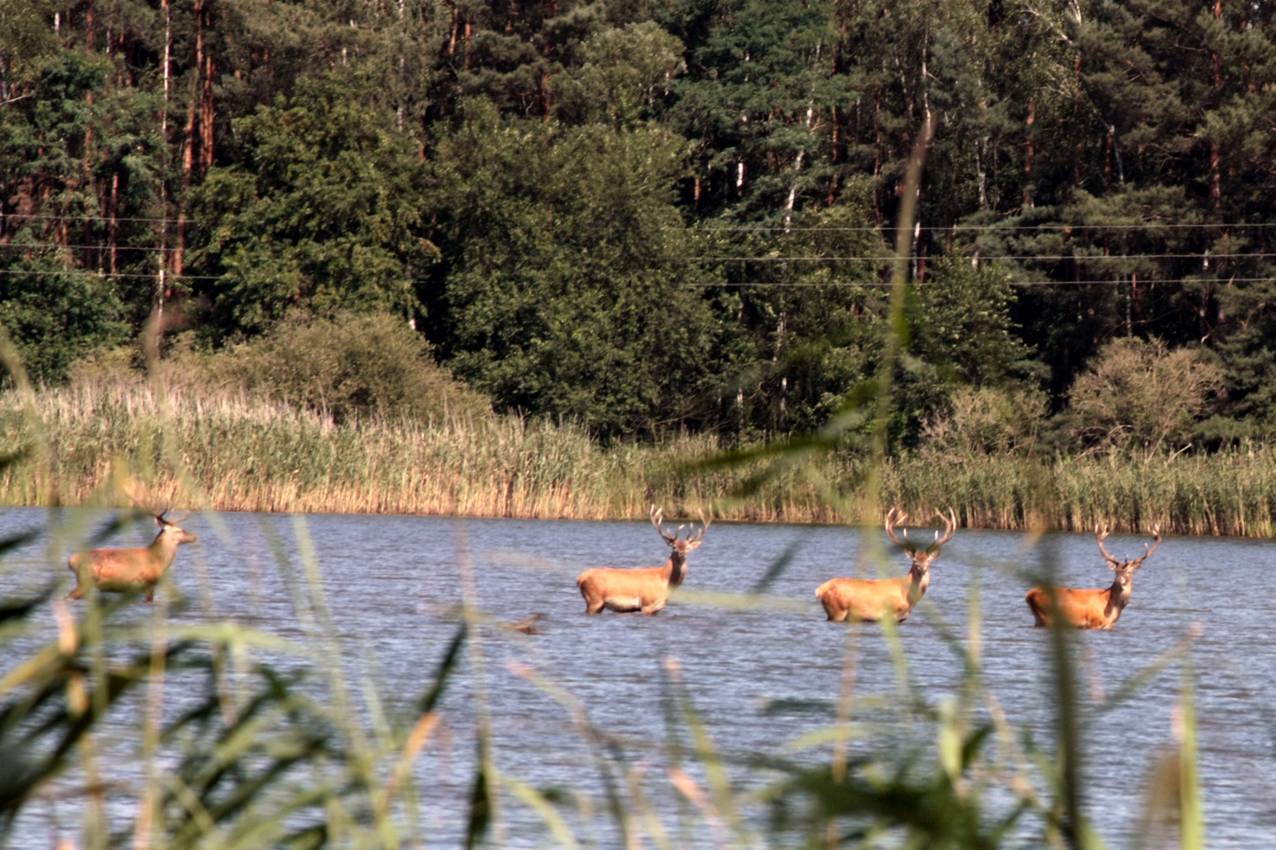

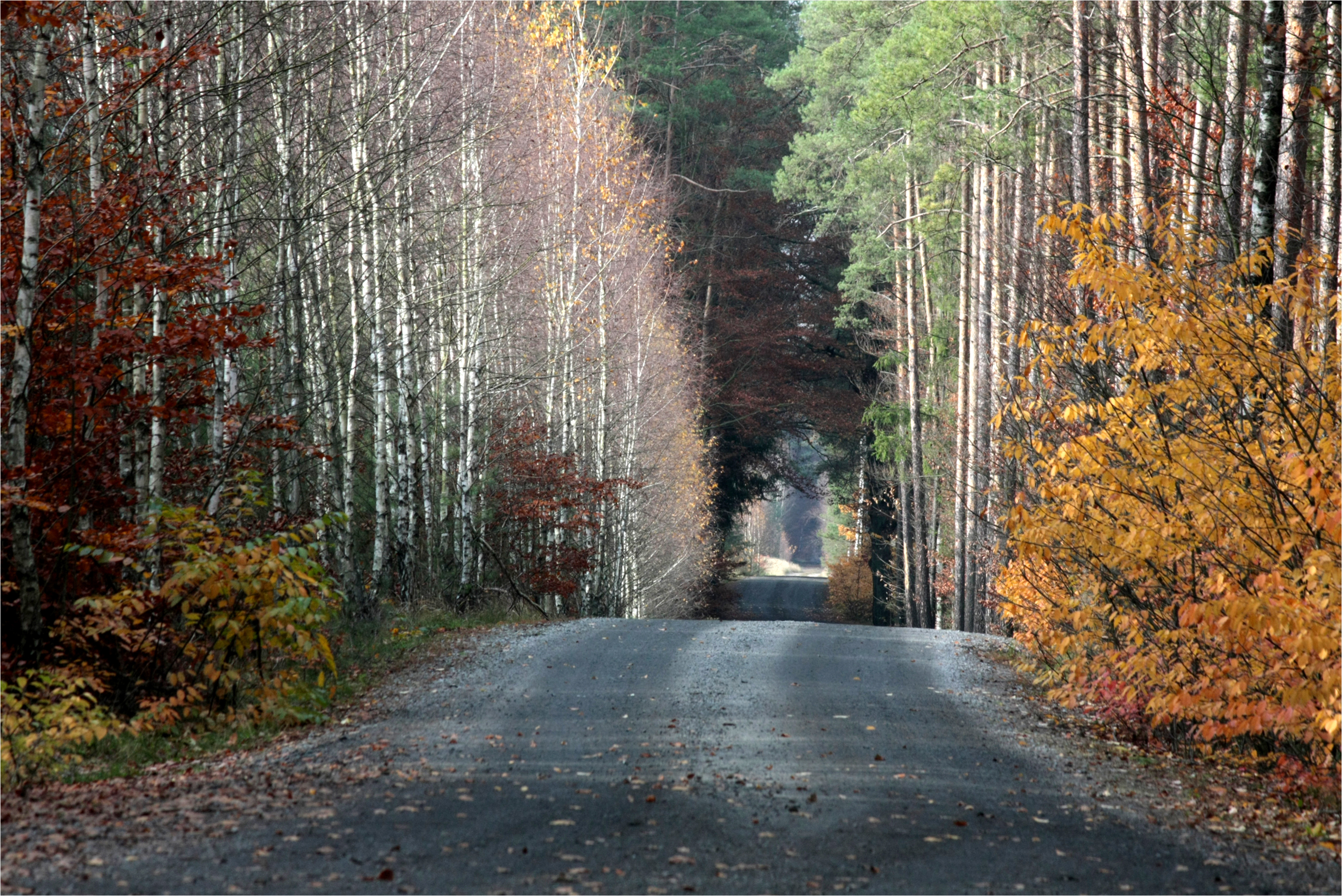
