= Warta Mouth National Park =

National park in Poland

- Park Narodowy Ujście Warty
- IUCN category II (national park)
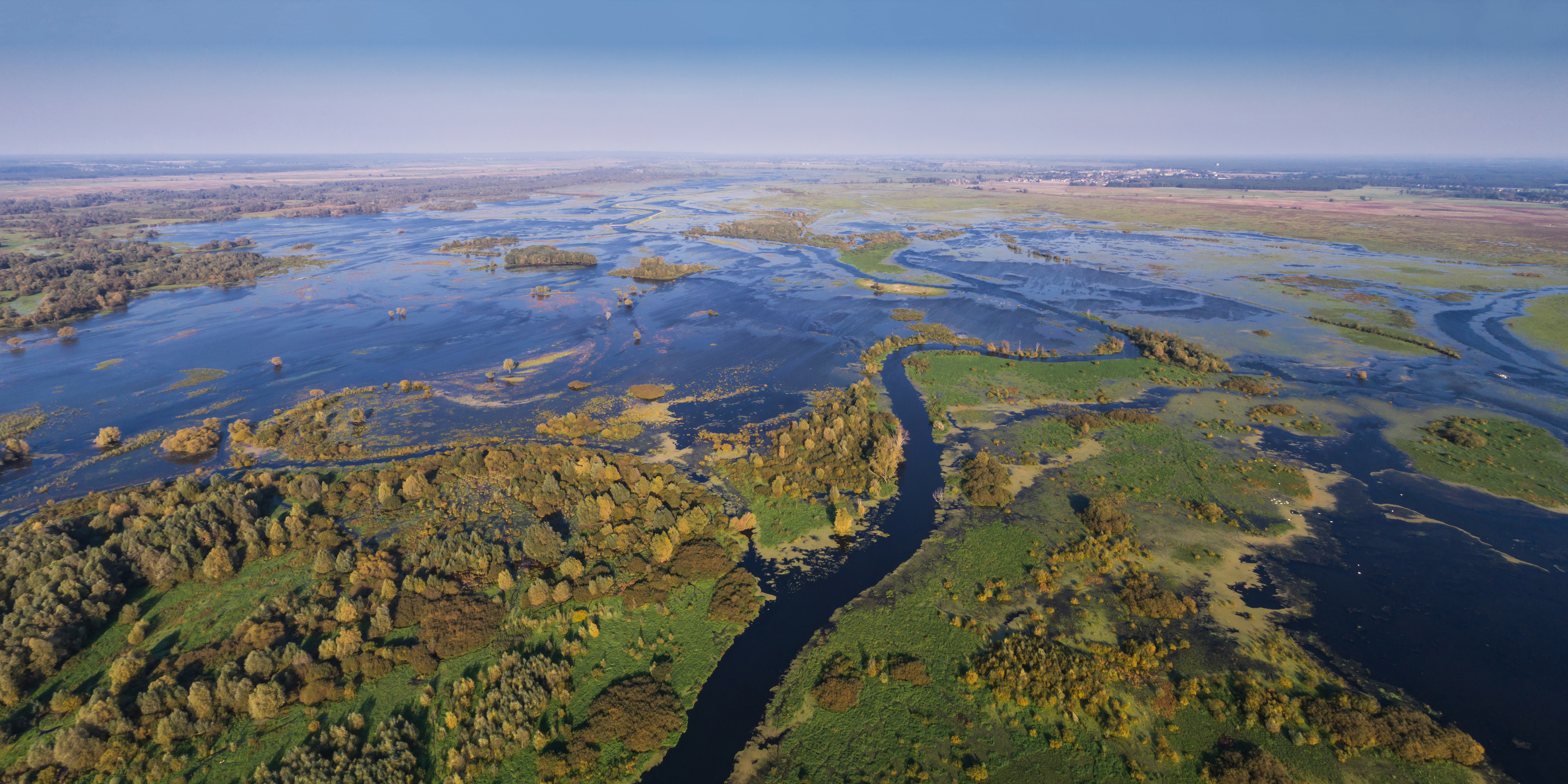
- Aerial view of the park Park logo with flying duck

- Location within Poland
- Location: Lubusz Voivodeship, Poland
- Coordinates: 52°34′37.92″N 14°43′32.88″E
- Area: 80.38 km^{2} (31.03 sq mi)
- Established: 2001
- Governing body: Ministry of the Environment
- Website: Official website

Ramsar Wetland
- Official name: Warta River Mouth National Park
- Designated: 3 January 1984
- Reference no.: 282

The Warta Mouth National Park (Polish: Park Narodowy Ujście Warty) is the youngest of Poland's 23 national parks. It was created on 19 June 2001 in the region of the lowest stretch of the Warta river, up to its confluence with the Odra (Oder), which marks the Polish–German border. The park covers an area of 80.38 square kilometres (31.03 sq mi) within Lubusz Voivodeship.

The park was created on the area of the former Słońsk Nature Reserve, which had existed since 1977, and parts of the Ujście Warty Landscape Park. The ground here is swampy and muddy, which makes it a haven for birds. This was why the former Słońsk preserve, which now forms part of the park, was in 1984 covered by the Ramsar Convention, whose purpose is to protect such areas.

The park has its headquarters in the village of Chyrzyno, near Kostrzyn nad Odrą.

== Waters ==
The park's main river is the Warta, which divides it into two parts – Southern (including the former Słońsk reserve) and Northern – the so-called Northern Polder. In the South, yearly changes in the level of the water reach up to four meters, and the park here serves as a gigantic, seasonal lake for excessive water. The water level here raises usually late in the fall, but it is the highest in the spring (March–April). The Northern part is rich in various canals and it is separated from the Warta by a levee.

== Wildlife ==
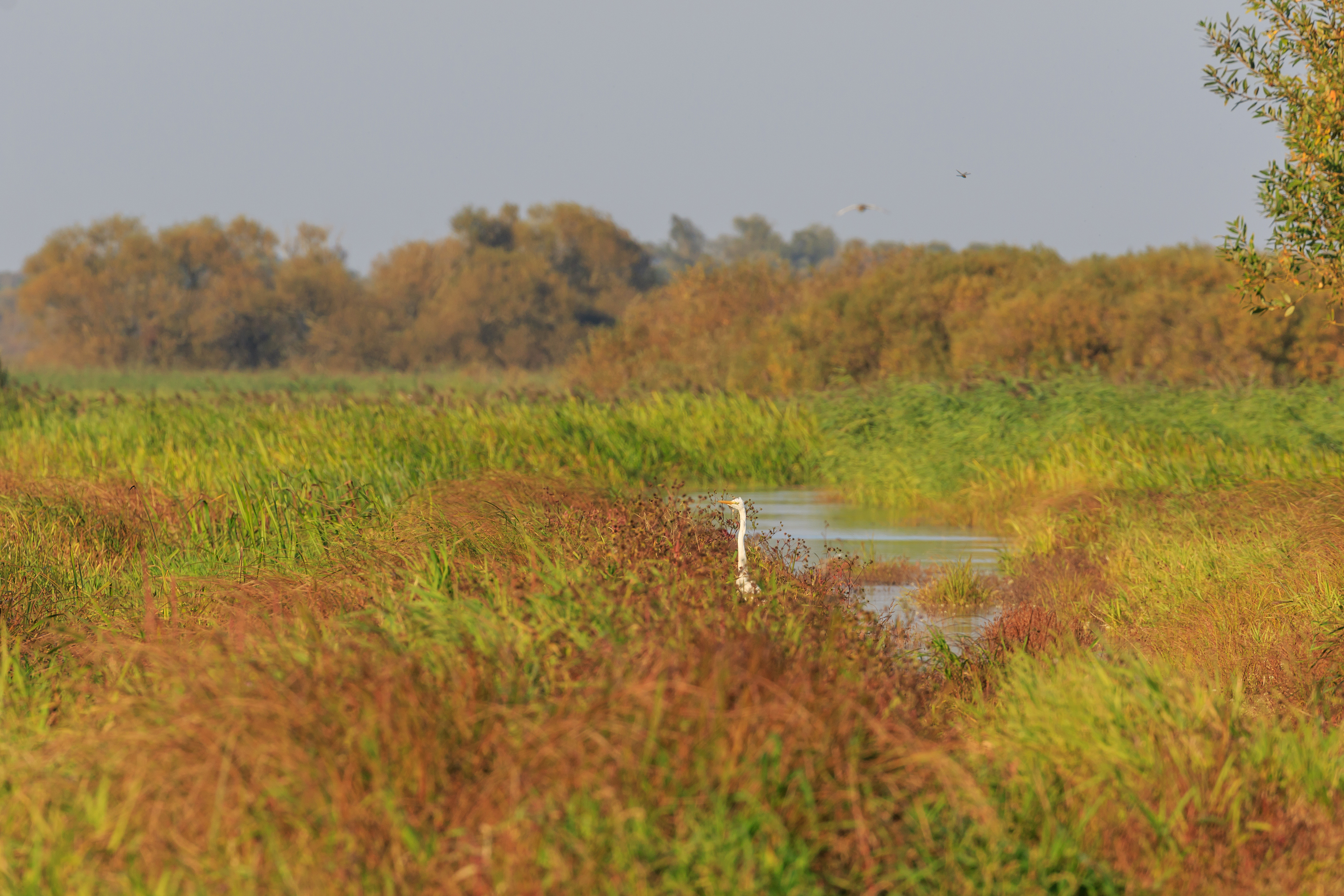
Great egret in Ujście Warty National Park

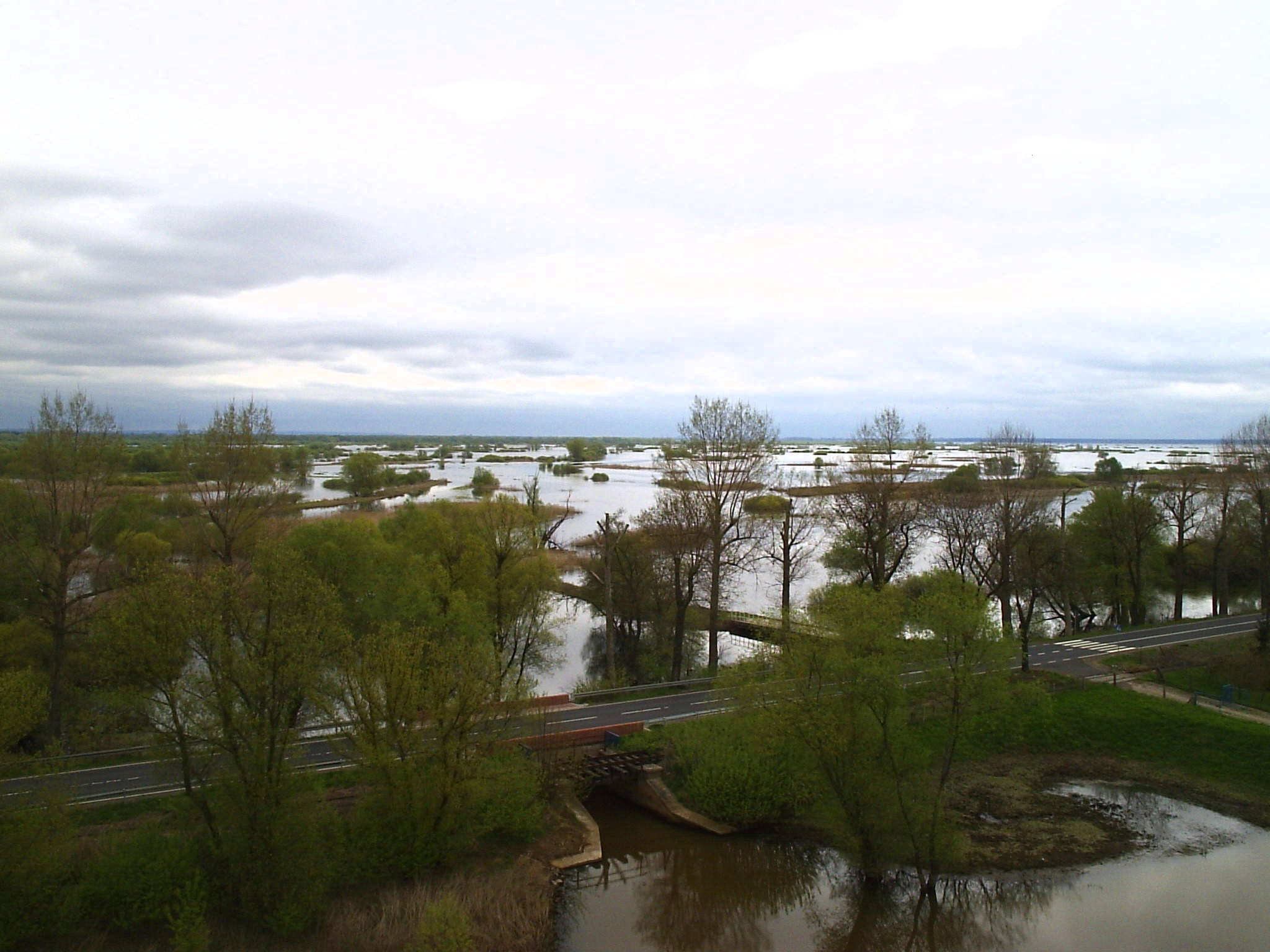
Bird sanctuary with an access road

Plant life is highly heterogeneous in biological sense. It is to large extent natural, although hundreds of years of human activity have influenced it, especially in the forested areas. On the other hand, nature in swampy areas closer to the Warta, is mainly untouched and as such is an interesting object of studies for biologists from Poland and other European countries. This is because most major river valleys in Europe have been changed by humans.

The area of the park is one of the most important regions of birds’ lairs in Poland. There are 245 species of birds here and lairs of 160, including 7–8 species of ducks. Twenty-six species are endangered (according to the BirdLife International list); among them are Acrocephalus paludicola, Crex crex, Limosa limosa, Grus grus, Botaurus stellaris, Ixobrychus minutus, and Chlidonias niger.

Moreover, in the park there are 34 species of mammals, including otters (Lutra lutra) and beavers (Castor fiber).

The main threat to the park's ecosystem is the return of bigger plants to the delicate systems of meadows and pastures. Their regrowth endangers lairs of birds, so the park's authorities have taken necessary steps to fight this phenomenon.

Since 31 May 1996 there has been Centre of Natural Education at Chyrzno, which since fall of that year has been organizing courses for pupils and students. Among activities undertaken by the centre are trips to the park, ornithology camps, and ecology workshops. In the park there are some walking and cycling trails and two nature walks Ptasim szlakiem (“Along birds’ trail”), which cross through the most valuable parts of the Słońsk reserve.

The park's Board owns a small lodge with five overnight rooms for 15 persons and a guest-house for about 30 visitors.
