= Grauże Nowe =

- Village
- Location within Poland
- Coordinates: 54°11′46″N 23°04′04″E
- Country: Poland
- Voivodeship: Podlaskie
- County: Suwałki
- Gmina: Szypliszki

Grauże Nowe [ˈɡrau̯ʐɛ ˈnɔvɛ] is a village in the administrative district of Gmina Szypliszki, within Suwałki County, Podlaskie Voivodeship, in north-eastern Poland, close to the border with Lithuania.

The towns nearest to it are Grauże Stare, Lipowo, Klonorejść, and Kaletnik. Its name probably comes from the Lithuanian word gražus, meaning 'beautiful'; 'nowe' means 'new' in Polish. The village is considered beautiful because of a scenic lake, Grauże; about 10 meters away from the lake is a resort.

== Notable people ==
Notable people born in, living in, or otherwise associated with Grauże Nowe include:

- Stanisław Kimszal, anti-Nazi partisan in World War II and leader of the Związek Inwalidów Wojennych Rzeczypospolitej Polskiej (Association of Disabled War Veterans of the Republic of Poland) in the West Pomeranian Voivodeship from 1980 until his death in 2018, born on 2 June 1924 in Grauże Nowe.
