= Battle of Sejny =

- Part of the Polish–Soviet War and Polish–Lithuanian War
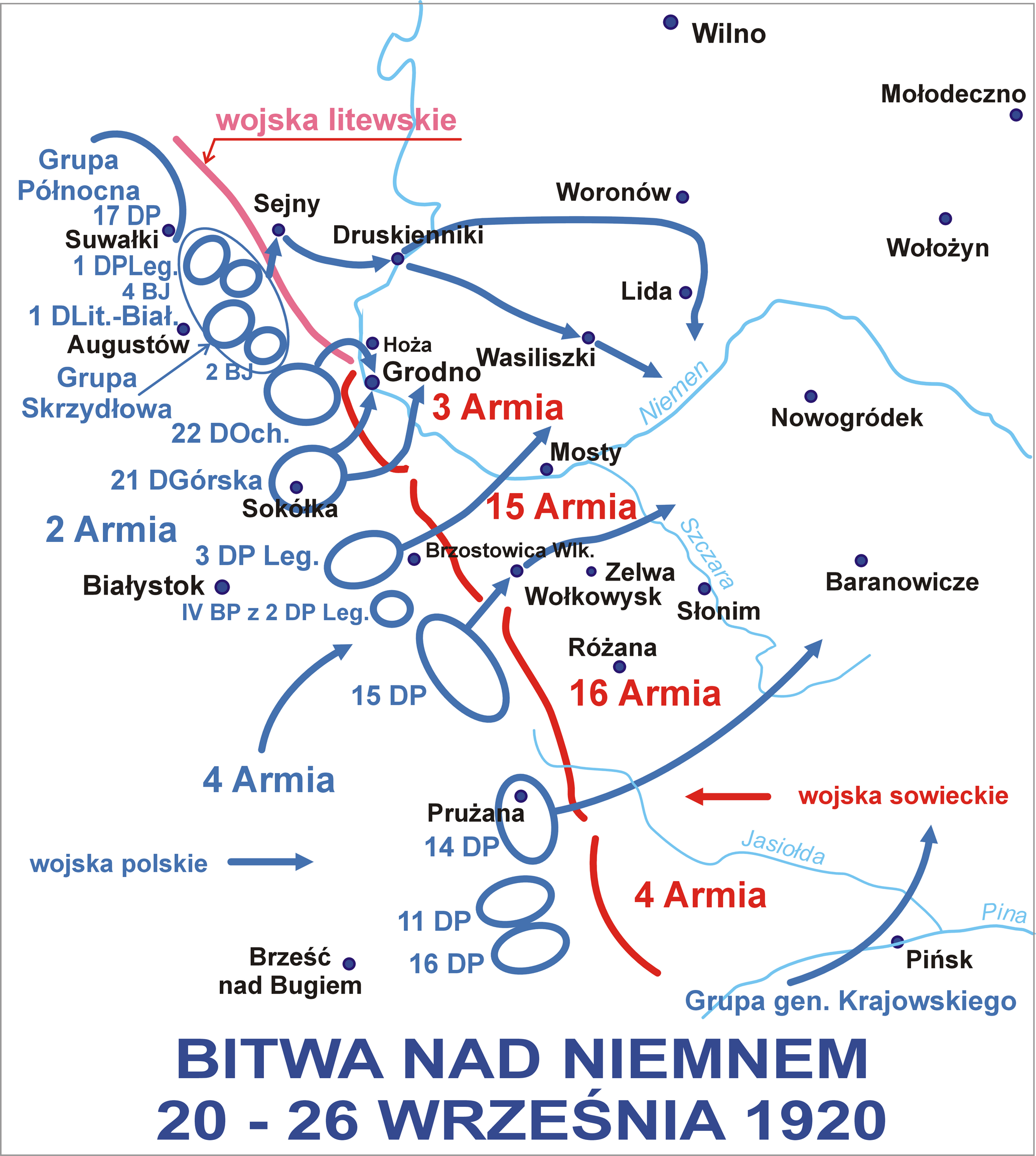
- Map of the Battle of the Niemen River as of September 20. Polish forces manoeuvred through the Lithuanian front line (in pink) to the rear of Soviet troops
Date	2–23 September 1920
Location	Suwałki Region
Result	Polish victory

Belligerents
Poland	Lithuania

Commanders and leaders
(Second Polish Republic) Edward Śmigły-Rydz (Second Polish Republic) Stefan Dąb-Biernacki	(Lithuania) Kazys Ladiga

Units involved
2nd Army	11 battalions

Strength
20,000–30,000	7,000–8,000

Casualties and losses
Unknown	2 officers and 32 soldiers KIA; 5 officers and 98 soldiers wounded; 38 officers and 1,700–1,996 soldiers captured

The Battle of Sejny (Polish: Bitwa o Sejny), Battle of Suwałki (Lithuanian: Suvalkų mūšis) or Sejny-Augustów operation (Lithuanian: Seinų-Augustavo operacija) took place during 2–23 September 1920, between the Polish and Lithuanian armies in the Suwałki Region. The fighting was especially focused on the towns of Sejny, Suwałki and Augustów (now in Poland).

== Background ==
=== Summer 1919 ===
The Polish–Lithuanian War was already going on since May 1919, when the first skirmishes between Polish and Lithuanian troops happened. On July 26, the Supreme Council of the Entente assigned Sejny and Suwałki districts to Poland with the Foch Line.

=== August–September 1919 ===
When the Reichswehr withdrew from Sejny and Suwałki on August 8, the Lithuanian Military Commandant's Office (Karo komendantūra) (established in Suwałki on June 6) ceased its activities, while the Military Commandant's Office at Sejny, where it was established in early 1919, continued to function.

The Suwałki district of the Polish Military Organisation (POW) (founded in early 1919) prepared the Sejny uprising, which led to Polish control over one of the centres of the Lithuanian National Revival on August 23. The Lithuanian Army retook it on August 28. However, the Lithuanian troops were forced to retreat behind the Foch line on September 6.

=== July 1920 ===
As part of the Polish–Soviet War, the offensive of Mikhail Tukhachevsky's Western Front began on 4 July 1920. Polish troops tried to stop the offensive at the Neman line. After the Bolsheviks captured Vilnius and Grodno on July 14 and 23, respectively, Polish troops withdrew to the Suwałki region. Poles organized defense on the line of Bug and Narew. On July 29, the battle to hold these rivers began.

On July 12, 1920, the Soviet–Lithuanian Peace Treaty ending the Lithuanian–Soviet War was signed after months of negotiations, whereby areas in the Suwałki region (also known as South Užnemunė in Lithuanian) were recognized as part of Lithuania.

While the Polish troops retreated due to Soviet attacks, the Lithuanian army's Marijampolė Group started its march on July 19. This unit, commanded by J. Motiejūnas-Valevičius, consisted of the 1st Reserve Battalion, one artillery battery and one squadron. The Lithuanian soldiers entered Vištytis, Wiżajny, Liubavas, Puńsk, Giby. By the end of July, all of Suwałki County was under Lithuanian control. The Lithuanians also took over part of the Augustów Forest up to the Augustów Canal. The Lithuanians took over Augustów on August 8.

== Prelude ==
On August 14, 1920, the Polish 2nd Army went on the offensive against the Red Army as part of the Battle of Warsaw and was ordered to retake Suwałki region; if the Lithuanians did not withdraw - to disarm them.

In late August, Operational Group of the Polish Army came to the area of Suwałki. The Polish forces operating against Lithuanians were 2 cavalry brigades (85 officers, 900 infantry, 1,500 horsemen), whereas the defending Lithuanians had a mostly infantry-based force in the region, which had 5 battalions, an artillery battery and one cavalry squadron.

=== Polish attack on August 28–31 ===
Following orders of Edward Rydz-Śmigły, Polish forces took Augustów from Lithuanians in a surprise attack on August 28. Confused and disoriented, Lithuanians retreated from Suwałki and Sejny on 30 and 31 August. Officially, there were no hostilities, but the Government of Lithuania and the leadership of the Lithuanian army considered these actions to be their declaration.

=== Lithuanian reorganization ===
So, the Lithuanians reorganized their forces. The Marijampolė Group was strengthened with the 2nd Infantry Division, transferred from the vicinity of Kaišiadorys, and was assigned Vincas Grigaliūnas-Glovackis as the group commander. The group now included 11 battalions with the strength 7,000 soldiers, in addition to 3 artillery batteries, and 1 cavalry squadron.

On September 1, Lithuanian army commander Kazys Ladiga ordered the Marijampolė Group to retake the lands taken over by the Polish army. The group was divided into 3 columns:

Column	Commander	Number of infantry battalions	Strength of artillery	Cavalry
Right	Aleksandras Jakaitis	2	1 battery	1 squadron
Centre	K. Ramanauskas	2	1 squad	/
Left	Julius Čaplikas	5	2 batteries	/

The Polish army had 2 infantry battalions and 2 cavalry regiments in Suwałki, 1 cavalry regiment in the Sejny, 2 cavalry regiments and 1 infantry battalion in the Augustów-Lipsk area.

== Battle ==
=== September 2–4: Lithuanian attack ===
The Lithuanians organized a counterattack to defend what they saw as their own lands on September 2 and the Marijampolė Group began its attack. The goal was to take and secure the Augustów–Lipsk–Grodno line.

The centre column took Sejny on September 2. By the morning of September 4, the centre column reached the Augustów lake area through Frącki and the Siersk forest, thus approached Augustów itself. The left column entered Lipsk on September 2, Sztabin, the gorges of the Augustów lake and by the evening of September 3, also approached Augustów.

Attacking on both sides of the Kalvarija–Suwałki road on September 4, the right column reached the Gulbieniszki–Czerwonka–Kaletnik line, fighting with the Polish near Żubryn and Gulbieniszki, but failing to capture Suwałki. Also on September 4, Kazys Škirpa's battalion from the centre column, which tried to take Suwałki from the east through Krasnopol, was stopped at the Wigry Lake and Perty Lake gorge. Nevertheless, the Lithuanians succeeded in reaching the outskirts of Augustów by September 4. The columns fought in isolation, lacked cavalry, and were forced to leave part of their forces for the protection of the rear, and did not enjoy the unanimous support of the population.

=== September 4–10: Polish counterattack ===
On September 4, the Polish army, reinforced by units transferred from Suwałki, attacked the rear of the middle column, shot its commander K. Ramanauskas and the column disintegrated due to lack of command. The Poles counterattacked and forced the Lithuanians to retreat. On the Augustów-Lipsk section, the Polish army units, reinforced by a cavalry regiment and an infantry battalion, took over Jastrzębna, so the left column, avoiding encirclement, withdrew from Augustów. On September 5, the Lithuanian army command ordered the Marijampolė Group to defend the line Lipsk–Czarna Hańcza–Wigry Lake–Kaletnik–Fornetka–Wiżajny Lake–Vištytis Lake.

During the first week of the operation, the Lithuanian losses were the following: 21 soldiers and 2 officers killed, 37 soldiers and 2 officers wounded; 163 soldiers and 2 officers captured. Sections to be defended by the Lithuanian army were distributed by the command regardless of the area and available forces, without creating any reserves.

The offensive of the Polish army was continued by Adam Nieniewski's Operational Cavalry Group (2 provisional brigades, 8-9 cavalry and 1 infantry regiment). On September 7, it forced the Czarna Hańcza river. Then, on September 9, it seized Giby, Sejny, Kaletnik.

=== Lithuanian reorganization ===
The 3rd Infantry Division led by Ignas Musteikis that was moved on September 9 to the Suwałki Region to stabilize the Lithuanian army's situation was deployed from the Vištytis Lake to Żegary. The 3rd Division consisted of 2 regiments, 1 separate company, 2 batteries, squadron, with a total of 164 officers and 5,615 soldiers. Meanwhile, the 2nd Division was deployed from Żegary to Grodno. The Polish Front was formed and its temporary headquarters established on September 11, with Maksimas Katche as commander.

=== September 13–22 ===
Before the upcoming negotiations, the Lithuanian military leadership decided to improve its army's positions. The Lithuanians pushed back. Thus, the 2nd Infantry Division took over Sejny on September 13. On September 14, the 2nd Division entered Giby, approached the Mara River and the Augustów Canal. Pending direct negotiations, hostilities were ceased on both sides that day. The negotiations in Kalvarija on 16–18 September 1920 ended without any agreement. Simultaneously, the Polish army had been planning a major offensive.

=== Polish offensive on September 22–23 ===
On 8 September, during a planning meeting of the Battle of the Niemen River, the Poles decided to maneuver through the Lithuanian-held territory to the rear of the Soviet Army, stationed in Grodno. Polish Northern Assault Group, consisting of infantry and cavalry divisions, was ready to enter action on 19 September, with the railroad hub of Lida set as its objective. The most important (wing) group of the Polish 2nd Army consisted of the:

- 1st Legions Infantry Division (4 regiments)
- 1st Lithuanian–Belarusian Division (3 regiments)
- 17th Infantry Division (4 regiments)
- 2nd and 4th Cavalry Brigades (2 cavalry brigades)

Force comparison
Type of unit	Polish forces	Lithuanian forces
Infantry Battalions	33	17
Cavalry Squadrons	39	3
Batteries	33	6
Machine Guns	375	144
Armored Cars	/	2

The Lithuanian forces had their two divisions assigned to two lines of defense, and outdated static and linear tactics were followed.

On September 22, the Polish units began their attack. They pushed out the Lithuanian 5th and 8th Infantry Regiments from Zelwa, Budwiecie and Berżniki, began to surround Sejny from the east, while others attacked from Wiłkopedzie in the north. The 1st Legions Infantry Division of Colonel Dab-Biernacki attacked Lithuanian 2nd Infantry Division at Sejny, capturing the town after a six-hour battle. Following the capture of Sejny, the Poles marched towards Druskininkai and Lida.

The 2nd Infantry Regiment, which fought west of the Sejny, was captured while retreating (headquarters with regimental commander Jonas Laurinaitis, 2 battalions, reconnaissance and communications teams, 6 artillery guns).

Attacking the left wing of the 8th Infantry Regiment, the Polish army moved across the Mara River and occupied Kapčiamiestis in the evening; thus scattering the regiment. The 4th Cavalry Brigade, after scattering Lithuanian infantry, captured bridges over the Nemunas at Druskininkai. On September 23, the Polish army reached the Druskininkai Bridge and moved across the Nemunas.

Polish forces then marched, as planned on 8 September across the Nemunas near Druskininkai and Merkinė to the rear of the Soviet forces near Grodno and Lida.

==== Casualties ====
During the battles of September 22–23, the Lithuanian Army's 2nd Infantry Division lost the following:

- 32 soldiers and 2 officers killed,
- 98 soldiers and 5 officers wounded,
- 1,996 soldiers and 38 officers captured,
- and 10 artillery guns.

== Evaluation ==
The Lithuanian defence was unsuccessful due to the extreme numerical superiority of the Polish army. In addition, the Lithuanian army followed only passive linear defensive tactics and was dispersed with small units. Its soldiers lacked military experience and the army's intelligence and communications were functioning poorly. The fundamental reasons for the Lithuanian defeat were the army's general shortcomings, such as its reduction in early 1920, the lack of high-ranking officers and insufficient cavalry, as well as an improper assessment of the capabilities of the Polish army. This defeat meant that the lands where many ethnic Lithuanians inhabited were lost to Poland and the Polish army, having moved across the Neman, occupied southeastern Lithuania, meaning convenient starting positions for gen. Lucjan Żeligowski's forces to occupy Vilnius during his false-flag mutiny in early October.

== Commemoration ==
The Battle of Sejny is commemorated on the Tomb of the Unknown Soldier, Warsaw, with the inscription "SEJNY 1 – 10, 22 IX 1920".

== Sources ==
- Borzęcki, Jerzy (2008-04-01). The Soviet–Polish Peace of 1921 and the Creation of Interwar Europe. Yale University Press. p. 106. ISBN 978-0-300-12121-6.

=== Lithuanian-language sources ===
- Ališauskas, Kazys (1958). "Lietuvos kariuomenė (1918–1944)". Lietuvių enciklopedija (in Lithuanian). Vol. XV. Boston, Massachusetts: Lietuvių enciklopedijos leidykla. OCLC 14547758.
- Lesčius, Vytautas (2004). Lietuvos kariuomenė nepriklausomybės kovose 1918–1920 (PDF) (in Lithuanian). Vilnius: Generolo Jono Žemaičio Lietuvos karo akademija. ISBN 9955-423-23-4. Archived from the original (PDF) on 2015-01-02.
- MELC (2018). "Seinų-Augustavo operacija". Visuotinė lietuvių enciklopedija (in Lithuanian).
- Vilkelis, Gintaras (2006). Lietuvos ir Lenkijos santykiai Tautų Sąjungoje (in Lithuanian). Versus aureus. ISBN 9955-601-92-2.

=== Polish-language sources ===
- Odziemkowski, Janusz. Leksykon wojny polsko-rosyjskiej 1919–1920 (in Polish). Warszawa: Oficyna Wydawnicza RYTM. ISBN 83-7399-096-8.
- Rąkowski, Grzegorz (2002). Polska egzotyczna (in Polish). Pruszków: Oficyna Wydawnicza REWASZ. ISBN 83-89188-37-6.

== See also ==
- Maps by Józef Smoleński on archive.org about this battle: 1, 2, 3, 4, 5, 6, 7, 8, 9, 10, 11, 12, 13, 14, 15.
