= Suwałki District (Home Army) =

Suwałki District of the Home Army
- Obwód Suwałki Armii Krajowej
- Active: 1939-1945
- Allegiance: Second Polish Republic
- Branch: Home Army
- Type: Underground
- Part of: Suwałki Inspectorate
- Garrison/HQ: Suwałki
- Engagements: World War II

The Suwałki district (Polish: Obwód Suwałki) was a sub-unit of the Home Army which covered the area of Suwałki County and Suwałki Region. Together with the Augustów District, it was part of the Suwałki Inspectorate, itself part of the Białystok District of the Home Army.

== History ==
Following the German and Soviet partition of Polish lands in September 1939, the Suwałki Region was incorporated into the East Prussia in Nazi Germany. In the lands incorporated into the Nazi Germany, clandestine activity was significantly hampered much more so than in the General Government. However, in 1940, the Suwałki Oblast was established here as well, and with minor changes, it survived until the end of the occupation.

The underground movement in the area was initiated by political activists, former soldiers of the Polish Army, and youth from the former Military Training and Riflemen's Association.

Captain Stanisław Bielecki ("Ziomek"), was appointed clandestine commander of the Suwałki district by the commander of the III District Command in Grodno, General Józef Olszyna-Wilczyński, who was retreating with the Operational Group Grodno units to Lithuania. Captain Bielecki established contact with the Białystok District command, which was being formed, and thus, by November 1939, he was subordinated to the SZP-ZWZ headquarters in Warsaw. The difficulties in the Suwałki district were enormous, because the Germans were trying to cleanse this area, incorporated into the Third Reich. They resettled the Lithuanian population to Lithuania. The Polish intelligentsia was massively arrested and deported to camps. Wealthy farmers were evicted and Germans were brought in to replace them.

Despite the difficulties, the underground resistance continued. Captain Bielecki, the second officer of the Border Protection Corps in Grodno, operated intensively with the help of six Border Protection Corps officers subordinated to him. This group adopted the codename "Temporary Council of the Suwałki Region". The main task was to collect and hide large stockpiles of weapons in the forests around Giby, Kaletnik and Sejwy, needed for underground activities. However, among the six officers was an Abwehr agent, platoon commander Zygmunt Majchrzak. Numerous arrests were made, including Captain Bielecki. All arrested on April 26, 1940 were shot in the Szwejcarskj forest next to Prudziszki.

The Suwałki District was divided into six sub-districts, and these, in turn, were divided into outposts. The area, with its large forests, lakes, and scattered settlements, provided excellent conditions for underground activities. By the spring of 1943, six partisan units were operating in the District. In the autumn of 1943 more were formed, under the command of "Jastrzębie," "Szczupak," "Rzędzian," and "Orlicz." During the period of preparations for Operation Tempest from January 1944 to August, partisan units conducted over 70 armed operations in the Suwałki District.
