= Słobódka, Suwałki County =

Słobódka
- Village
- Location within Poland
- Coordinates: 54°16′N 23°6′E
- Country: Poland
- Voivodeship: Podlaskie
- County: Suwałki
- Gmina: Szypliszki
- Time zone: UTC+1 (CET)
  - Summer (DST): UTC+2 (CEST)
- Postal code: 16-411
- Vehicle registration: BSU

Słobódka ([swɔˈbutka]; Lithuanian: Slabada) is a village in the administrative district of Gmina Szypliszki, within Suwałki County, Podlaskie Voivodeship, in north-eastern Poland, close to the border with Lithuania.

According to the 1921 census, the village had a population of 137, entirely Polish by nationality and Roman Catholic by confession.

== Sources ==
- VLKK (2002). "Atvirkštinis lietuvių kalboje vartojamų tradicinių Lenkijos vietovardžių formų sąrašas" (PDF). VLKK (in Lithuanian).
