= Jasionowo =

Jasionowo may refer to the following places:

- Jasionowo, Augustów County in Podlaskie Voivodeship (north-east Poland)
- Jasionowo, Gmina Rutka-Tartak in Podlaskie Voivodeship (north-east Poland)
- Jasionowo, Gmina Szypliszki in Podlaskie Voivodeship (north-east Poland)
