= Sitkowizna =

- Village
- Location within Poland
- Coordinates: 54°14′N 23°5′E
- Country: Poland
- Voivodeship: Podlaskie
- County: Suwałki
- Gmina: Szypliszki
- Time zone: UTC+1 (CET)
  - Summer (DST): UTC+2 (CEST)
- Postal code: 16-411
- Vehicle registration: BSU

Sitkowizna [ɕitkɔˈvizna] is a village in the administrative district of Gmina Szypliszki, within Suwałki County, Podlaskie Voivodeship, in north-eastern Poland, close to the border with Lithuania.

According to the 1921 census, the village had a population of 71, entirely Polish by nationality and Roman Catholic by confession.

== Climate ==
Sitkowizna has a humid continental climate with mild summers and cold winters, typical of northeastern Poland. Winters are characterized by significantly low temperatures with frequent snowfall, while summers are mild, with temperatures generally ranging from warm to moderate. The area experiences regular precipitation throughout the year, with a slight increase during the summer months. The highest temperatures are usually recorded in July, while January is the coldest month of the year.
