= Jegliniec, Suwałki County =

Jegliniec
- Village
- Location within Poland
- Coordinates: 54°18′20″N 23°09′11″E
- Country: Poland
- Voivodeship: Podlaskie
- County: Suwałki
- Gmina: Szypliszki

Jegliniec ([jɛˈɡliɲɛt͡s]; Lithuanian: Eglinė) is a village in the administrative district of Gmina Szypliszki, within Suwałki County, Podlaskie Voivodeship, in north-eastern Poland, close to the border with Lithuania.

Remnants of a Yotvingian fortified settlement are located in this village. The town was founded near the end of the 18th century in Grodno County, Trakai Voivodeship.

== Sources ==
- VLKK (2002). "Atvirkštinis lietuvių kalboje vartojamų tradicinių Lenkijos vietovardžių formų sąrašas" (PDF). VLKK (in Lithuanian). Archived from the original (PDF) on 2012-02-14.
