= Kociołki, Podlaskie Voivodeship =

Kociołki
- Village
- Location within Poland
- Coordinates: 54°16′37″N 23°4′31″E
- Country: Poland
- Voivodeship: Podlaskie
- County: Suwałki
- Gmina: Szypliszki
- Population: 50

Kociołki [kɔˈt͡ɕɔu̯ki] is a village in the administrative district of Gmina Szypliszki, within Suwałki County, Podlaskie Voivodeship, in north-eastern Poland, close to the border with Lithuania.
