= Garbas Drugi, Podlaskie Voivodeship =

Garbas Drugi
- Village
- Interactive map of Garbas Drugi
- Coordinates: 54.1910°N 22.5266°E
- Country: Poland
- Voivodeship: Podlaskie Voivodeship
- County: Suwałki
- Gmina: Filipów

Garbas Drugi [ɡarbasdruɡi] is a village on the northern coast of the Mieruńskie Lake, in the administrative district of Gmina Filipów, within Suwałki County, Podlaskie Voivodeship, in north-eastern Poland.
