= Czarne, Podlaskie Voivodeship =

Czarne
- Village
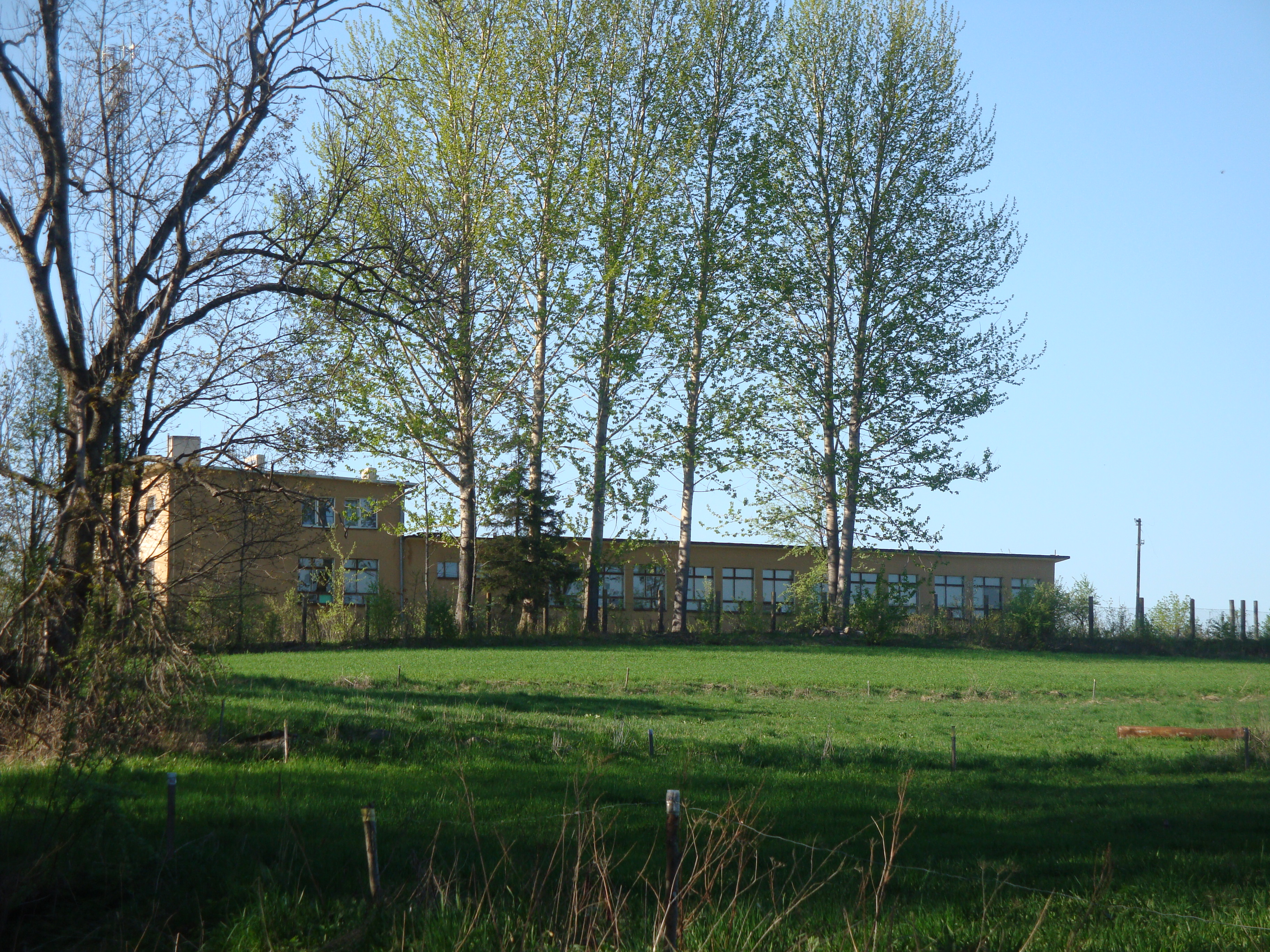

- Location within Poland
- Coordinates: 54°13′57″N 22°32′16″E
- Country: Poland
- Voivodeship: Podlaskie
- County: Suwałki
- Gmina: Filipów

Czarne [ˈt͡ʂarnɛ] is a village in the administrative district of Gmina Filipów, within Suwałki County, Podlaskie Voivodeship, in north-eastern Poland.
