= Majdan, Suwałki County =

Majdan
- Village
- Location within Poland
- Coordinates: 54°18′N 23°5′E
- Country: Poland
- Voivodeship: Podlaskie
- County: Suwałki
- Gmina: Szypliszki

Majdan (Polish pronunciation: [ˈmajdan]) is a village in the administrative district of Gmina Szypliszki, within Suwałki County, Podlaskie Voivodeship, in north-eastern Poland, close to the border with Lithuania.
