= Supienie =

- Village
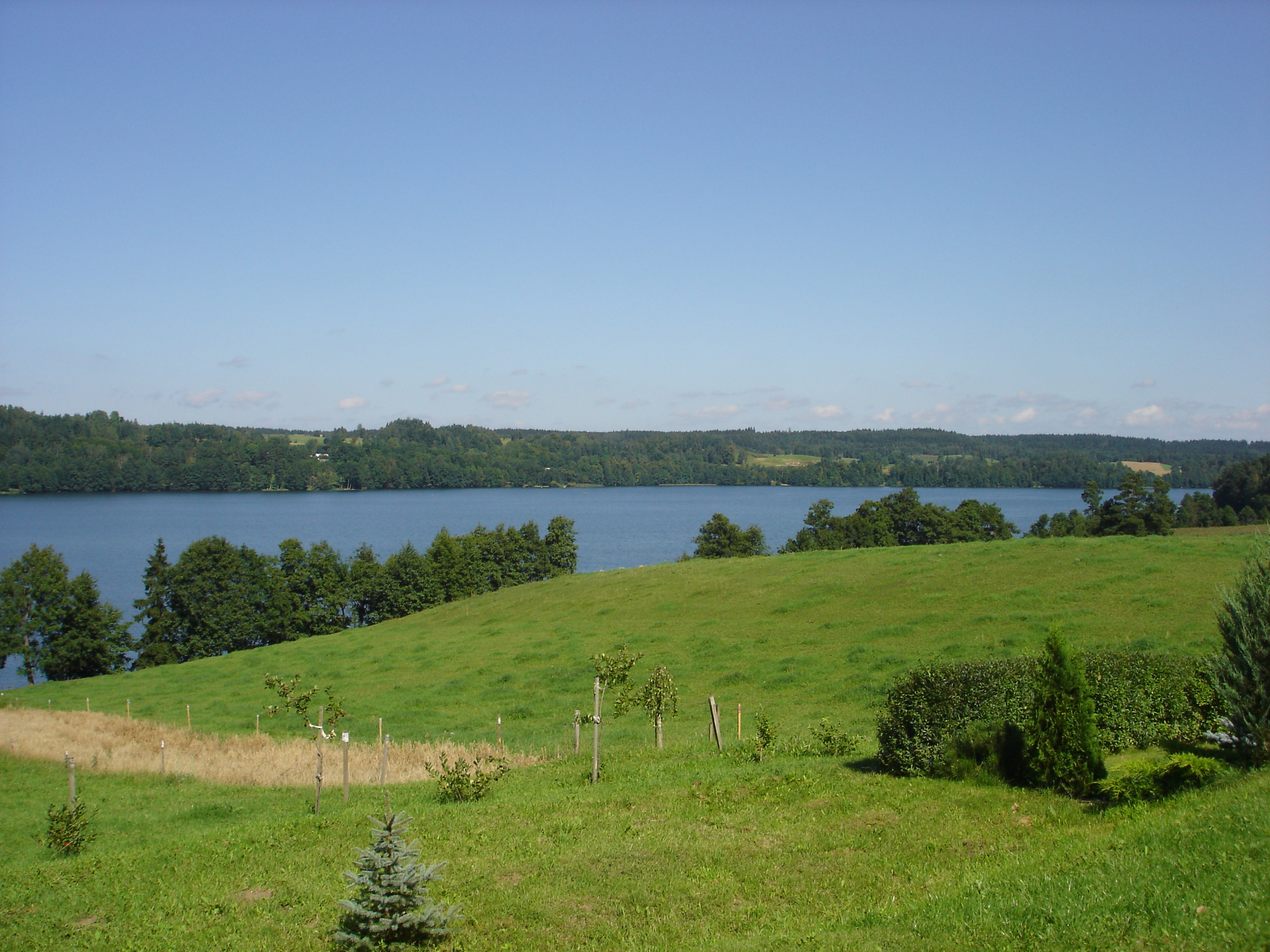

- Location within Poland
- Coordinates: 54°13′N 22°34′E
- Country: Poland
- Voivodeship: Podlaskie
- County: Suwałki
- Gmina: Filipów

Supienie [suˈpjɛɲɛ] is a village in the administrative district of Gmina Filipów, within Suwałki County, Podlaskie Voivodeship, in north-eastern Poland.

Accommodations in Supienie range from hotels to pensions, holiday resorts, and private apartments.

The postal code for Supienie is 16-424.
