= Smolnica, Suwałki County =

Smolnica
- Village
- Location within Poland
- Coordinates: 54°20′N 23°3′E
- Country: Poland
- Voivodeship: Podlaskie
- County: Suwałki
- Gmina: Rutka-Tartak

Smolnica [smɔlˈnit͡sa] is a village in the administrative district of Gmina Rutka-Tartak, within Suwałki County, Podlaskie Voivodeship, in north-eastern Poland, close to the border with Lithuania.
