= Szymanowizna =

- Settlement
- Location within Poland
- Coordinates: 54°16′36″N 23°06′31″E
- Country: Poland
- Voivodeship: Podlaskie
- County: Suwałki
- Gmina: Szypliszki

Szymanowizna (Polish pronunciation: [ʂɨmanɔˈvizna]) is a settlement in the administrative district of Gmina Szypliszki, within Suwałki County, Podlaskie Voivodeship, in north-eastern Poland, close to the border with Lithuania.
