= Stare Motule =

- Village
- Location within Poland
- Coordinates: 54°11′19″N 22°41′11″E
- Country: Poland
- Voivodeship: Podlaskie
- County: Suwałki
- Gmina: Filipów
- Time zone: UTC+1 (CET)
  - Summer (DST): UTC+2 (CEST)
- Vehicle registration: BSU

Stare Motule [ˈstarɛ mɔˈtulɛ] is a village in the administrative district of Gmina Filipów, within Suwałki County, Podlaskie Voivodeship, in north-eastern Poland.

== History ==
During the German occupation of Poland (World War II), in 1944, German troops carried out expulsions of Poles, leaving one intellectually disabled man to do forced labour after which he was murdered (see Nazi crimes against the Polish nation).
