= Kleszczówek =

- Village
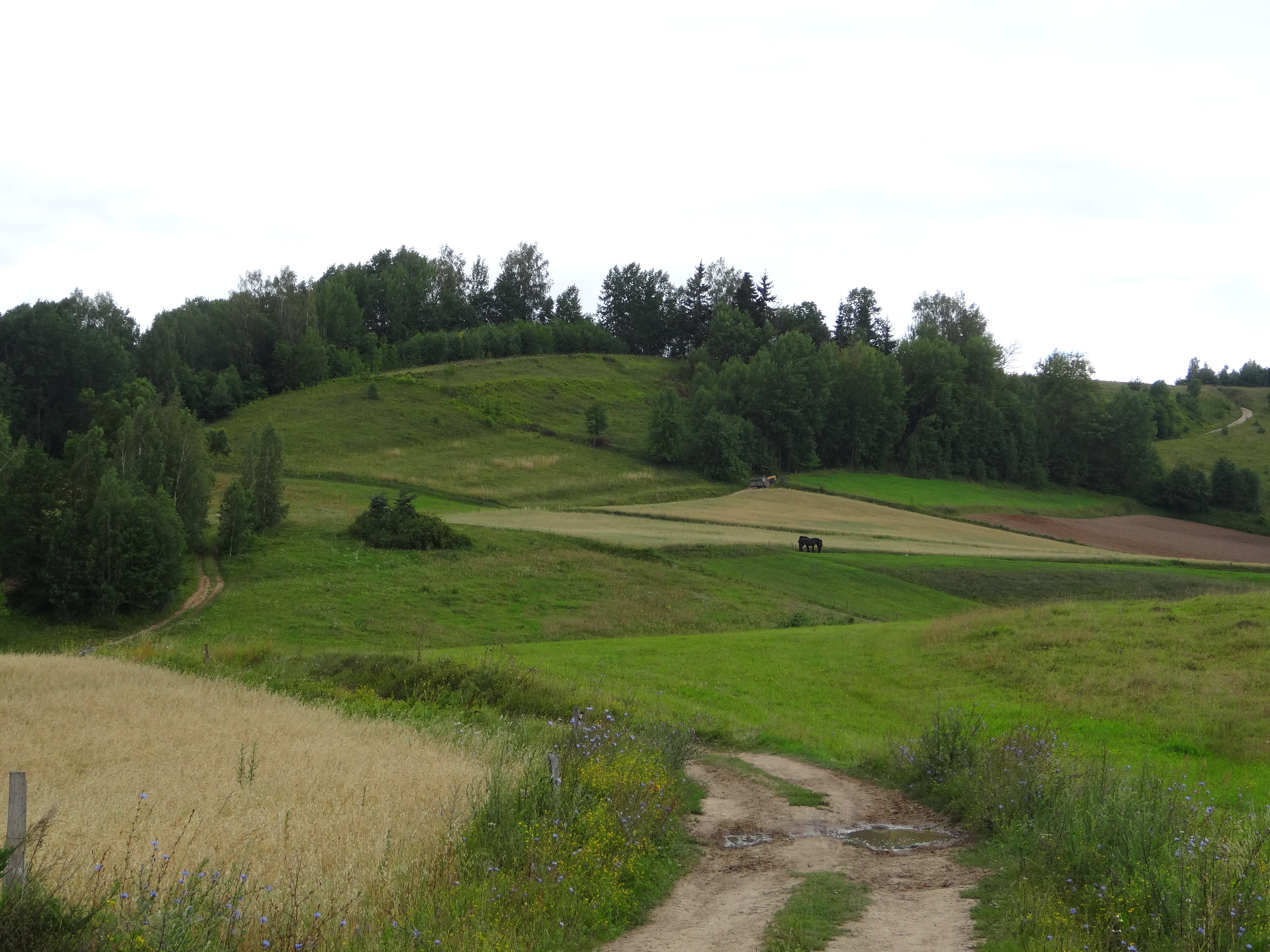

- Location within Poland
- Coordinates: 54°17′N 22°54′E
- Country: Poland
- Voivodeship: Podlaskie
- County: Suwałki
- Gmina: Rutka-Tartak

Kleszczówek [klɛʂˈt͡ʂuvɛk] is a village in the administrative district of Gmina Rutka-Tartak, within Suwałki County, Podlaskie Voivodeship, in north-eastern Poland, close to the border with Lithuania.

Until 31 December 2009 it was a part of gmina Wiżajny.
