= Bitkowo =

Bitkowo refers to the following places in Poland:

- Bitkowo, Gołdap County
- Bitkowo, Suwałki County
