= Czerwonka, Suwałki County =

Czerwonka
- Village
- Location within Poland
- Coordinates: 54°12′N 23°1′E
- Country: Poland
- Voivodeship: Podlaskie
- County: Suwałki
- Gmina: Szypliszki
- Time zone: UTC+1 (CET)
  - Summer (DST): UTC+2 (CEST)
- Postal code: 16-411
- Vehicle registration: BSE

Czerwonka ([t͡ʂɛrˈvɔnka]) is a village in the administrative district of Gmina Szypliszki, within Suwałki County, Podlaskie Voivodeship, in north-eastern Poland, close to the border with Lithuania.

According to the 1921 census, the village had a population of 107, entirely Polish by nationality.
