= Smolenka =

- Village
- Location within Poland
- Coordinates: 54°09′18″N 22°45′39″E
- Country: Poland
- Voivodeship: Podlaskie
- County: Suwałki
- Gmina: Filipów

Smolenka [smɔˈlɛŋka] is a village in the administrative district of Gmina Filipów, within Suwałki County, Podlaskie Voivodeship, in north-eastern Poland.
