= Polimonie =

- Village
- Location within Poland
- Coordinates: 54°17′19″N 22°54′18″E
- Country: Poland
- Voivodeship: Podlaskie
- County: Suwałki
- Gmina: Rutka-Tartak

Polimonie [pɔliˈmɔɲɛ] is a village in the administrative district of Gmina Rutka-Tartak, within Suwałki County, Podlaskie Voivodeship, in north-eastern Poland, close to the border with Lithuania. Until 31 December 2009 it was a part of gmina Wiżajny.
