= Przejma Wysoka =

- Village
- Location within Poland
- Coordinates: 54°16′N 23°0′E
- Country: Poland
- Voivodeship: Podlaskie
- County: Suwałki
- Gmina: Szypliszki

Przejma Wysoka [ˈpʂɛi̯ma vɨˈsɔka] is a village in the administrative district of Gmina Szypliszki, within Suwałki County, Podlaskie Voivodeship, in north-eastern Poland, close to the border with Lithuania.
