= Rospuda, Podlaskie Voivodeship =

Rospuda
- Village
- Location within Poland
- Coordinates: 54°13′N 22°37′E
- Country: Poland
- Voivodeship: Podlaskie
- County: Suwałki
- Gmina: Filipów

Rospuda [rɔsˈpuda] is a village in the administrative district of Gmina Filipów, within Suwałki County, Podlaskie Voivodeship, in north-eastern Poland.
