= Kadaryszki =

- Village
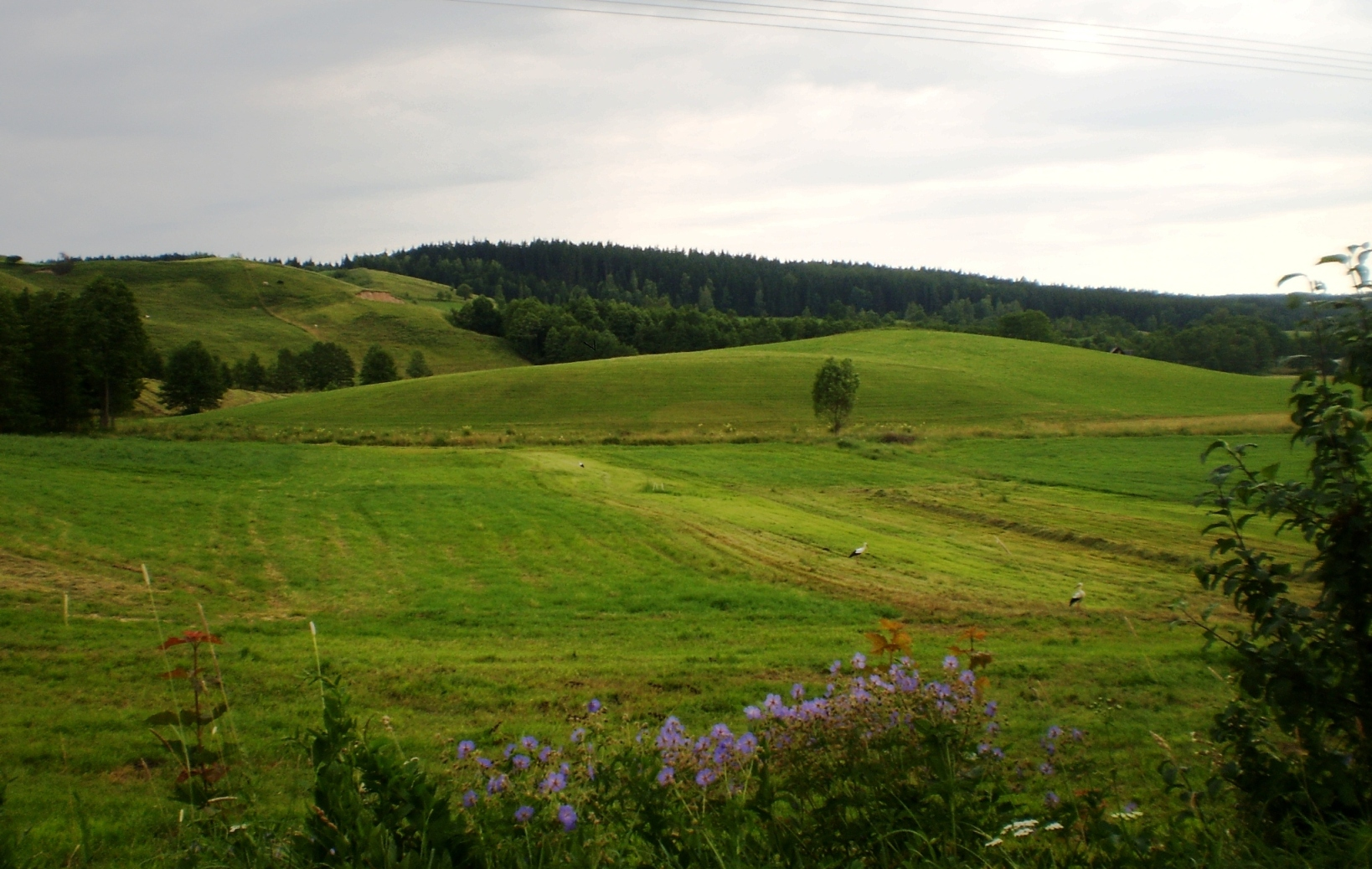

- Location within Poland
- Coordinates: 54°19′50″N 22°57′03″E
- Country: Poland
- Voivodeship: Podlaskie
- County: Suwałki
- Gmina: Rutka-Tartak

Kadaryszki [kadaˈrɨʂki] is a village in the administrative district of Gmina Rutka-Tartak, within Suwałki County, Podlaskie Voivodeship, in north-eastern Poland, close to the border with Lithuania.
