= Huta, Gmina Filipów =

Huta
- Village
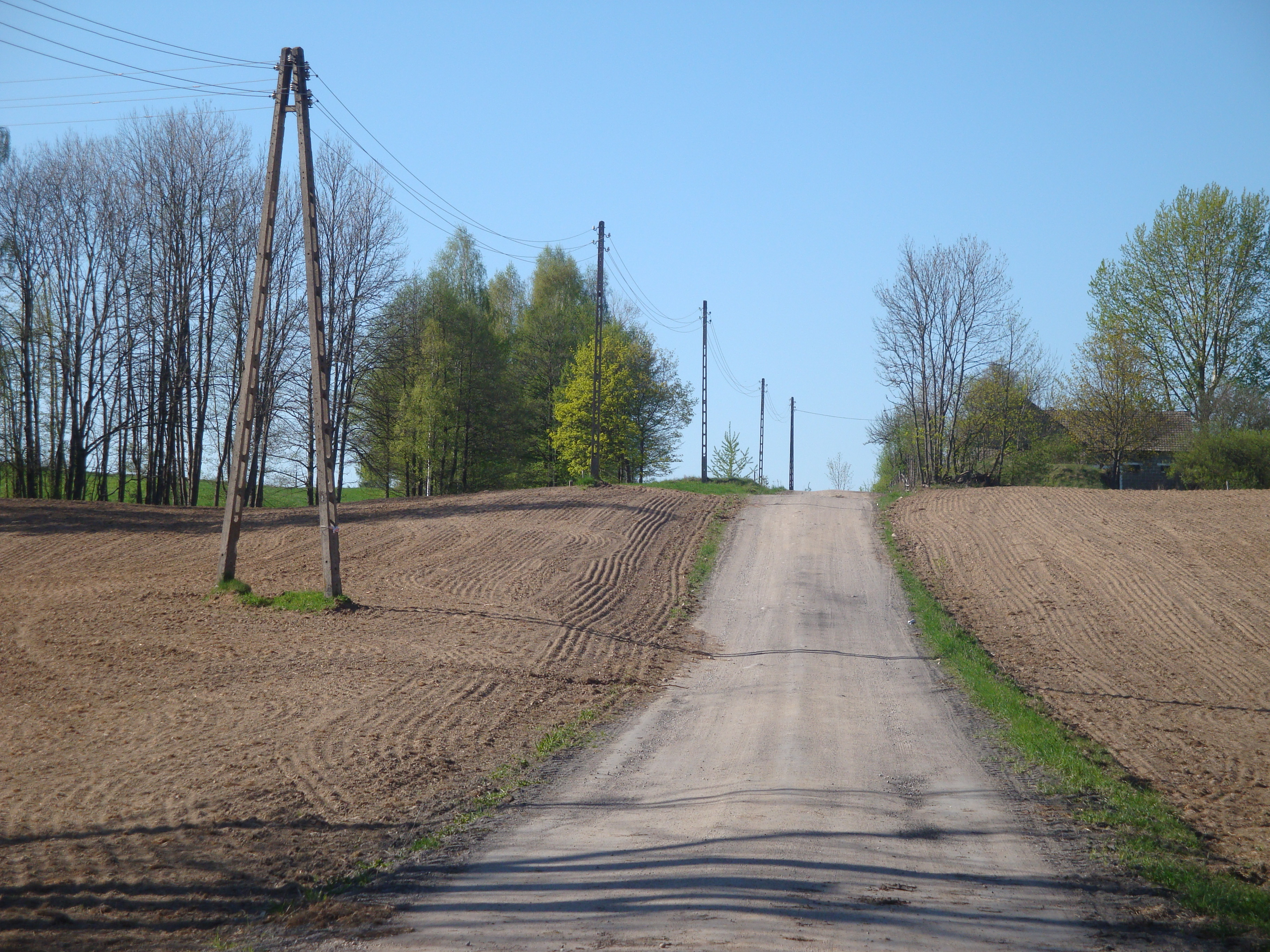

- Location within Poland
- Coordinates: 54°13′32″N 22°35′22″E
- Country: Poland
- Voivodeship: Podlaskie
- County: Suwałki
- Gmina: Filipów

Huta [ˈxuta] is a village in the administrative district of Gmina Filipów, within Suwałki County, Podlaskie Voivodeship, in north-eastern Poland.
