= Wólka, Gmina Filipów =

Wólka
- Village
- Location within Poland
- Coordinates: 54°12′16″N 22°36′20″E
- Country: Poland
- Voivodeship: Podlaskie
- County: Suwałki
- Gmina: Filipów

Wólka [ˈvulka] is a village in the administrative district of Gmina Filipów, within Suwałki County, Podlaskie Voivodeship, in north-eastern Poland.
