= Nowa Dębszczyzna =

Village in Gmina Filipów, Poland

- Village
- Location within Poland
- Coordinates: 54°09′22″N 22°42′15″E
- Country: Poland
- Voivodeship: Podlaskie
- County: Suwałki
- Gmina: Filipów

Nowa Dębszczyzna [ˈnɔva dɛmpʂˈt͡ʂɨzna] is a village in the administrative district of Gmina Filipów, within Suwałki County, Podlaskie Voivodeship, in north-eastern Poland.
