= Bartnia Góra, Podlaskie Voivodeship =

Bartnia Góra
- Village
- Location within Poland
- Coordinates: 54°08′47″N 22°43′26″E
- Country: Poland
- Voivodeship: Podlaskie
- County: Suwałki
- Gmina: Filipów
- Population: 19

Bartnia Góra [ˈbartɲa ˈɡura] is a village in the administrative district of Gmina Filipów, within Suwałki County, Podlaskie Voivodeship, in north-eastern Poland.
