= Białobłota =

Village in Gmina Szypliszki, Poland

- Village
- Location within Poland
- Coordinates: 54°17′05″N 23°02′32″E
- Country: Poland
- Voivodeship: Podlaskie
- County: Suwałki
- Gmina: Szypliszki
- Postal code: 16-406
- Vehicle registration: BSU

Białobłota [bjawɔˈbwɔta] is a village in the administrative district of Gmina Szypliszki, within Suwałki County, Podlaskie Voivodeship, in north-eastern Poland, close to the border with Lithuania.

Five Polish citizens were murdered by Nazi Germany in the village during World War II.
