= Ejszeryszki =

- Village
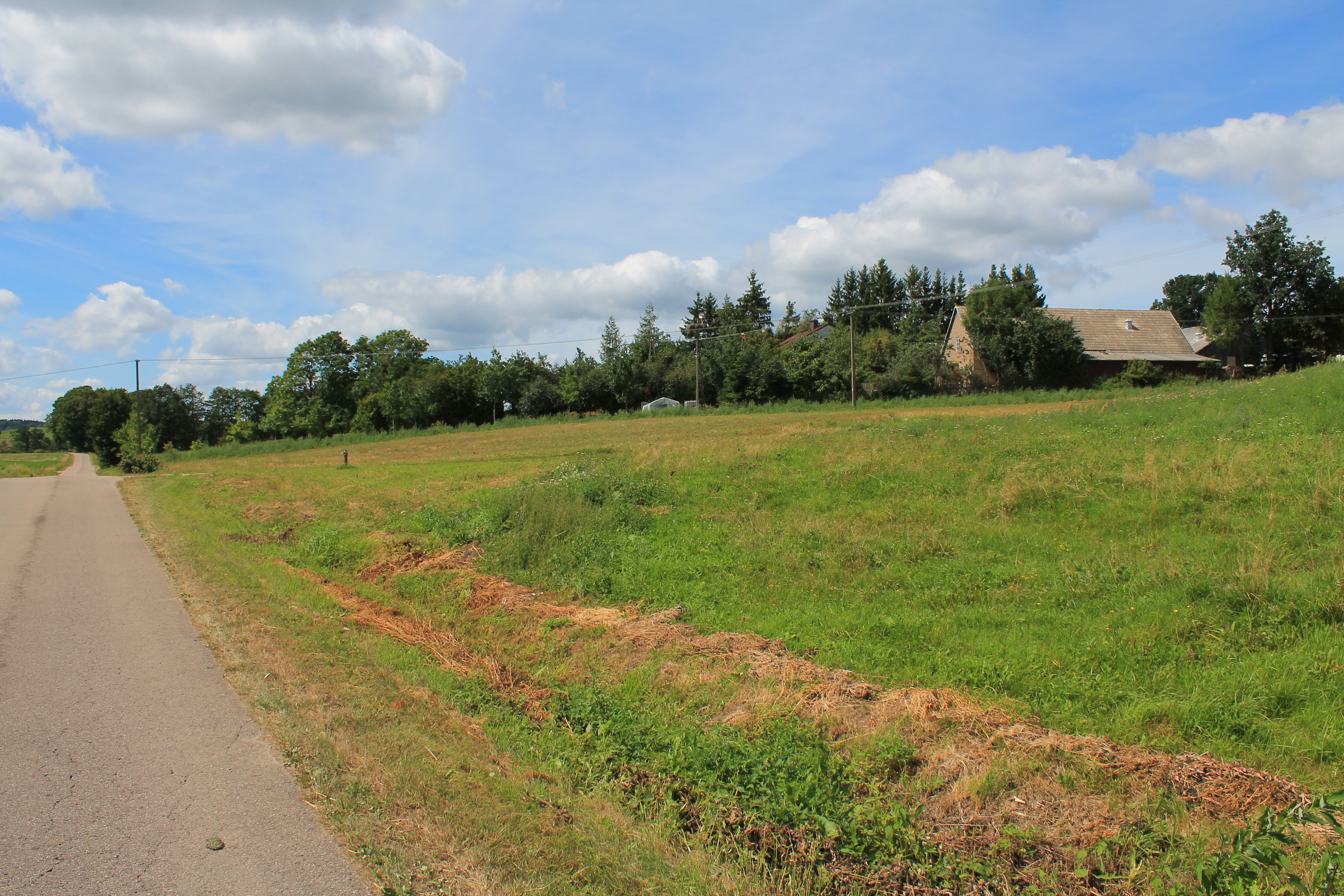

- Location within Poland
- Coordinates: 54°22′36″N 22°57′58″E
- Country: Poland
- Voivodeship: Podlaskie
- County: Suwałki
- Gmina: Rutka-Tartak
- Population: 81
- Postal code: 16-406
- Area code: +48 87

Ejszeryszki [ɛi̯ʂɛˈrɨʂki] is a village in the administrative district of Gmina Rutka-Tartak, within Suwałki County, Podlaskie Voivodeship, in north-eastern Poland, close to the border with Lithuania.
