= Deksznie =

- Village
- Location within Poland
- Coordinates: 54°18′N 23°11′E
- Country: Poland
- Voivodeship: Podlaskie
- County: Suwałki
- Gmina: Szypliszki
- Population: 67

Deksznie ([ˈdɛkʂɲɛ]; Lithuanian: Dekšniai) is a village in the administrative district of Gmina Szypliszki, within Suwałki County, Podlaskie Voivodeship, in north-eastern Poland, close to the border with Lithuania.
