= Adamowizna, Podlaskie Voivodeship =

Adamowizna
- Village
- Location within Poland
- Coordinates: 54°10′41″N 23°06′52″E
- Country: Poland
- Voivodeship: Podlaskie
- County: Suwałki
- Gmina: Szypliszki

Adamowizna [adamɔˈvizna] is a village in the administrative district of Gmina Szypliszki, within Suwałki County, Podlaskie Voivodeship, in north-eastern Poland, close to the border with Lithuania.
