= Piecki =

Piecki may refer to the following places:

- Piecki, Bydgoszcz County in Kuyavian-Pomeranian Voivodeship (north-central Poland)
- Piecki, Podlaskie Voivodeship (north-east Poland)
- Piecki, Pomeranian Voivodeship (north Poland)
- Piecki, Warmian-Masurian Voivodeship (north Poland)
