= Potopy =

- Village
- Location within Poland
- Coordinates: 54°20′38″N 22°57′38″E
- Country: Poland
- Voivodeship: Podlaskie
- County: Suwałki
- Gmina: Rutka-Tartak

Potopy [pɔˈtɔpɨ] is a village in the administrative district of Gmina Rutka-Tartak, within Suwałki County, Podlaskie Voivodeship, in north-eastern Poland, close to the border with Lithuania.
