= Szypliszki =

- Village
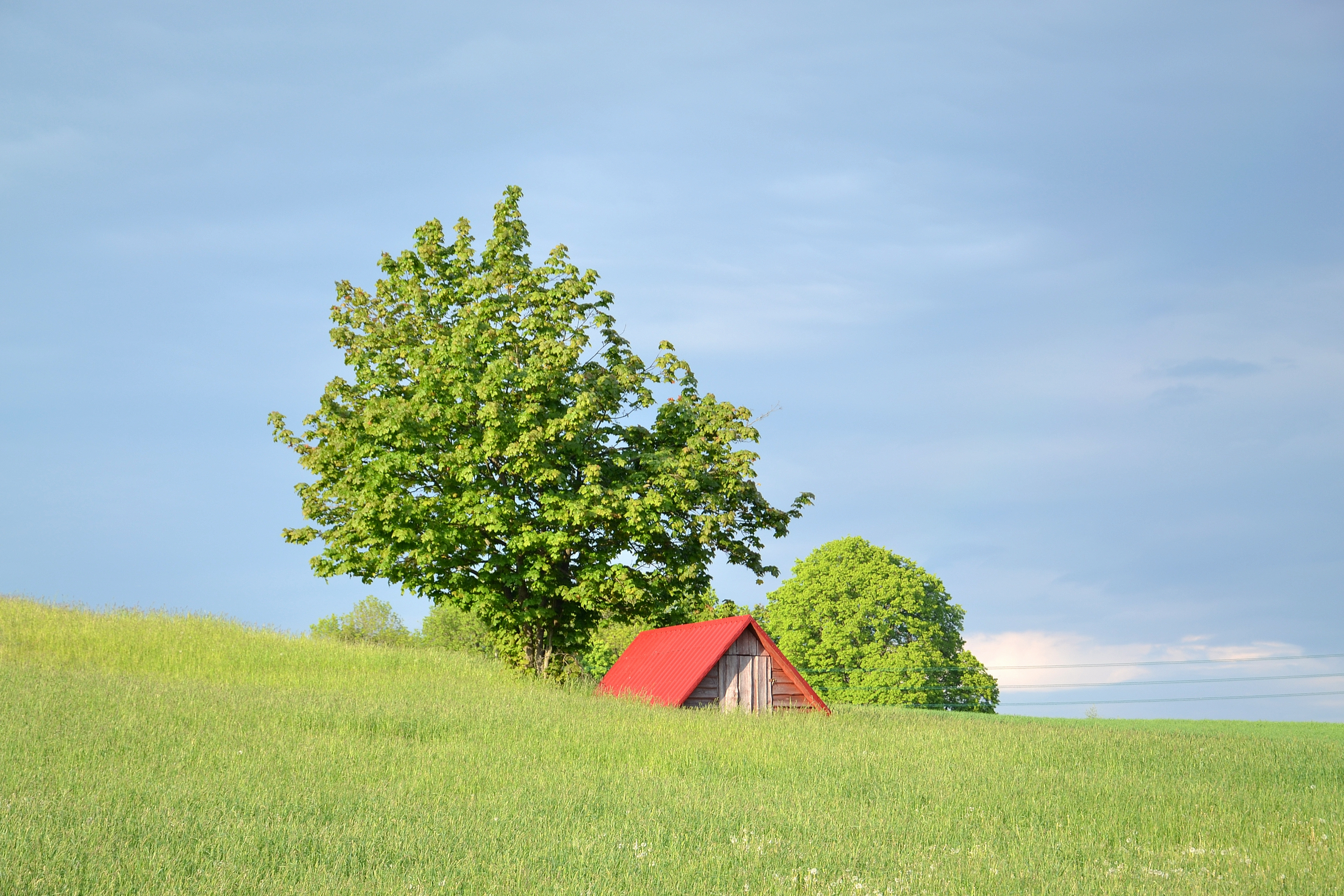
- Landscape near Szypliszki

- Location within Poland
- Coordinates: 54°15′N 23°4′E
- Country: Poland
- Voivodeship: Podlaskie
- County: Suwałki
- Gmina: Szypliszki

Population
  - Total: 300
- Time zone: UTC+1 (CET)
  - Summer (DST): UTC+2 (CEST)
- Postal code: 16-411
- Vehicle registration: BSU

Szypliszki ([ʂɨˈpliʂki]; Lithuanian: Šipliškė, Cipliškės) is a village in Suwałki County, Podlaskie Voivodeship, in north-eastern Poland, close to the border with Lithuania. It is the seat of the gmina (administrative district) called Gmina Szypliszki.

According to the 1921 census, the village and settlement of Szypliszki had a population of 224, entirely Polish by nationality.

== Sources ==
- VLKK (2002). "Atvirkštinis lietuvių kalboje vartojamų tradicinių Lenkijos vietovardžių formų sąrašas" (PDF). VLKK (in Lithuanian).
