= Jemieliste, Podlaskie Voivodeship =

Jemieliste
- Village
- Location within Poland
- Coordinates: 54°12′N 22°44′E
- Country: Poland
- Voivodeship: Podlaskie
- County: Suwałki
- Gmina: Filipów
- Population (approx.): 180

Jemieliste [jɛmjɛˈlistɛ] is a village in the administrative district of Gmina Filipów, within Suwałki County, Podlaskie Voivodeship, in north-eastern Poland.
