= Garbas =

- Village
- Location within Poland
- Coordinates: 54°11′N 22°44′E
- Country: Poland
- Voivodeship: Podlaskie
- County: Suwałki
- Gmina: Filipów
- Population: 865

Garbas [ˈɡarbas] is a village in the administrative district of Gmina Filipów, within Suwałki County, Podlaskie Voivodeship, in north-eastern Poland.
