= Smolniki, Podlaskie Voivodeship =

Smolniki
- Village
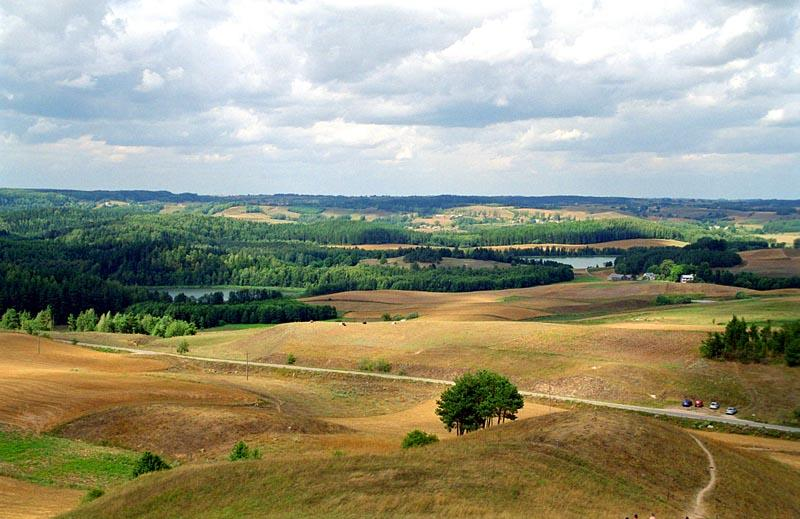

- Location within Poland
- Coordinates: 54°17′13″N 22°52′53″E
- Country: Poland
- Voivodeship: Podlaskie
- County: Suwałki
- Gmina: Rutka-Tartak
- Website: http://www.smolniki.pl

Smolniki [smɔlˈniki] is a village in the administrative district of Gmina Rutka-Tartak, within Suwałki County, Podlaskie Voivodeship, in north-eastern Poland, close to the border with Lithuania.

Until 31 December 2009 it was a part of gmina Wiżajny.
