= Andrzejewo, Podlaskie Voivodeship =

Andrzejewo
- Village
- Location within Poland
- Coordinates: 54°17′N 23°5′E
- Country: Poland
- Voivodeship: Podlaskie
- County: Suwałki
- Gmina: Szypliszki

Andrzejewo ([andʐɛˈjɛvɔ]; Lithuanian: Andrejavas) is a village in the administrative district of Gmina Szypliszki, within Suwałki County, Podlaskie Voivodeship, in north-eastern Poland, close to the border with Lithuania.

== Sources ==
- VLKK (2002). "Atvirkštinis lietuvių kalboje vartojamų tradicinių Lenkijos vietovardžių formų sąrašas" (PDF). VLKK (in Lithuanian).
