= Szelment =

- Village
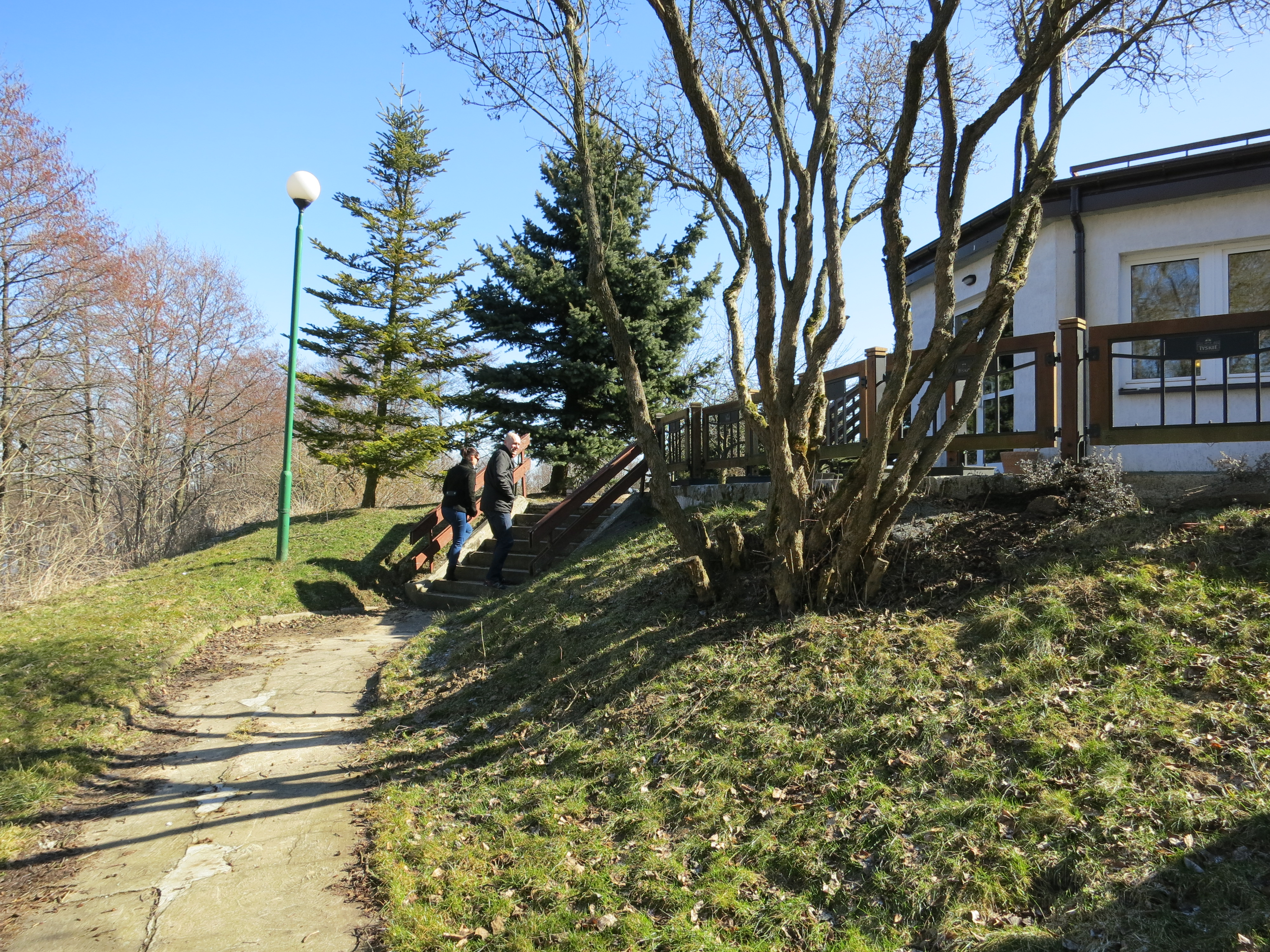

- Location within Poland
- Coordinates: 54°17′35.8800″N 23°3′29.1600″E
- Country: Poland
- Voivodeship: Podlaskie
- County: Suwałki
- Gmina: Szypliszki

Szelment ([ˈʂɛlmɛnt]; Lithuanian: Šelmentas,) is a settlement in the administrative district of Gmina Szypliszki, within Suwałki County, Podlaskie Voivodeship, in north-eastern Poland, close to the border with Lithuania. Szelment is located 15 km (9 mi) north of Suwałki. It is also home to a 1000m cable car line, the second-longest in Poland. It is located 6.0 km (4 mi) from the nearest city in Lithuania, Salaperaugis.

== Sources ==
- VLKK (2002). "Atvirkštinis lietuvių kalboje vartojamų tradicinių Lenkijos vietovardžių formų sąrašas" (PDF). VLKK (in Lithuanian).
