= Jeziorki, Suwałki County =

Jeziorki
- Village
- Location within Poland
- Coordinates: 54°16′16″N 23°05′35″E
- Country: Poland
- Voivodeship: Podlaskie
- County: Suwałki
- Gmina: Szypliszki

Jeziorki [jɛˈʑɔrki] is a village in the administrative district of Gmina Szypliszki, within Suwałki County, Podlaskie Voivodeship, in north-eastern Poland, close to the border with Lithuania.
