= Krejwiany, Suwałki County =

Village in Gmina Rutka-Tartak, Poland

Krejwiany
- Village
- Location within Poland
- Coordinates: 54°22′31″N 22°59′40″E
- Country: Poland
- Voivodeship: Podlaskie
- County: Suwałki
- Gmina: Rutka-Tartak

Krejwiany [krɛi̯ˈvjanɨ] is a village in the administrative district of Gmina Rutka-Tartak, within Suwałki County, Podlaskie Voivodeship, in north-eastern Poland, close to the border with Lithuania.
