= Baranowo, Podlaskie Voivodeship =

Baranowo
- Village
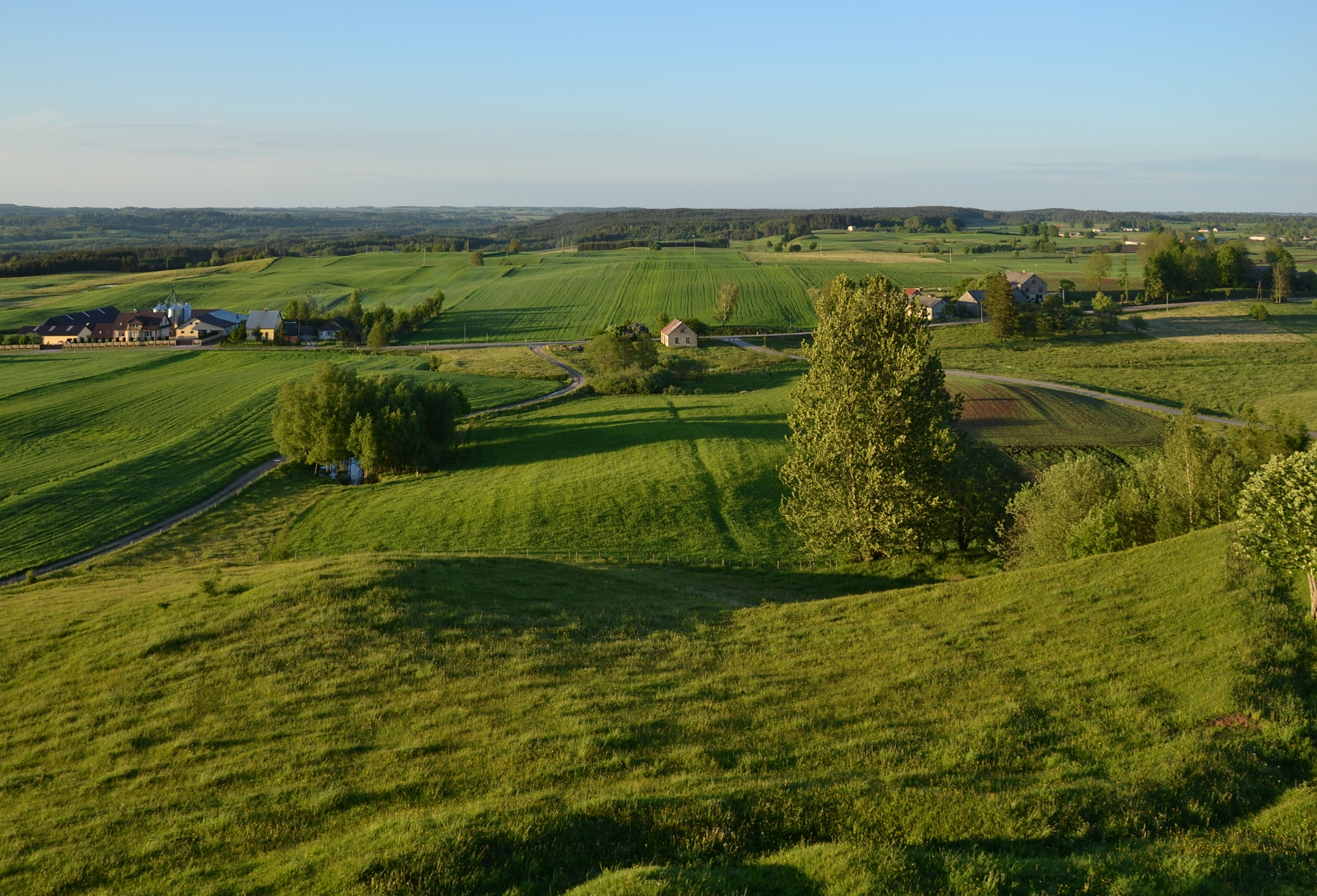

- Location within Poland
- Coordinates: 54°19′N 22°59′E
- Country: Poland
- Voivodeship: Podlaskie
- County: Suwałki
- Gmina: Rutka-Tartak

Baranowo [baraˈnɔvɔ] is a village in the administrative district of Gmina Rutka-Tartak, within Suwałki County, Podlaskie Voivodeship, in north-eastern Poland, close to the border with Lithuania.

In 1944, SS troops pacified the village of Baranowo, murdering 19 people
