= Krzywólka, Gmina Szypliszki =

Village in Gmina Szypliszki, Poland

Krzywólka
- Village
- Location within Poland
- Coordinates: 54°16′01″N 23°01′50″E
- Country: Poland
- Voivodeship: Podlaskie
- County: Suwałki
- Gmina: Szypliszki

Krzywólka [kʂɨˈvulka] is a village in the administrative district of Gmina Szypliszki, within Suwałki County, Podlaskie Voivodeship, in north-eastern Poland, close to the border with Lithuania.
