= Czostków, Podlaskie Voivodeship =

Village in Gmina Filipów, Poland

Czostków
- Village
- Location within Poland
- Coordinates: 54°12′50″N 22°37′56″E
- Country: Poland
- Voivodeship: Podlaskie
- County: Suwałki
- Gmina: Filipów

Czostków [ˈt͡ʂɔstkuf] is a village in the administrative district of Gmina Filipów, within Suwałki County, Podlaskie Voivodeship, in north-eastern Poland.
