= Aleksandrówka, Suwałki County =

Aleksandrówka
- Village
- Location within Poland
- Coordinates: 54°17′N 23°7′E
- Country: Poland
- Voivodeship: Podlaskie
- County: Suwałki
- Gmina: Szypliszki

Aleksandrówka [alɛksanˈdrufka] is a village in the administrative district of Gmina Szypliszki, within Suwałki County, Podlaskie Voivodeship, in north-eastern Poland, close to the border with Lithuania.
