= Przejma Mała =

- Village
- Location within Poland
- Coordinates: 54°14′47″N 22°59′32″E
- Country: Poland
- Voivodeship: Podlaskie
- County: Suwałki
- Gmina: Szypliszki

Przejma Mała [ˈpʂɛi̯ma ˈmawa] is a village in the administrative district of Gmina Szypliszki, within Suwałki County, Podlaskie Voivodeship, in north-eastern Poland, close to the border with Lithuania.
