= Bitkowo, Suwałki County =

Bitkowo
- Village
- Location within Poland
- Coordinates: 54°12′29″N 22°31′10″E
- Country: Poland
- Voivodeship: Podlaskie
- County: Suwałki
- Gmina: Filipów

Bitkowo ([bitˈkɔvɔ]; Lithuanian: Bitkovas) is a village in the administrative district of Gmina Filipów, within Suwałki County, Podlaskie Voivodeship, in north-eastern Poland.
