= Gmina Filipów =

Gmina Filipów Filipów Commune
- Gmina
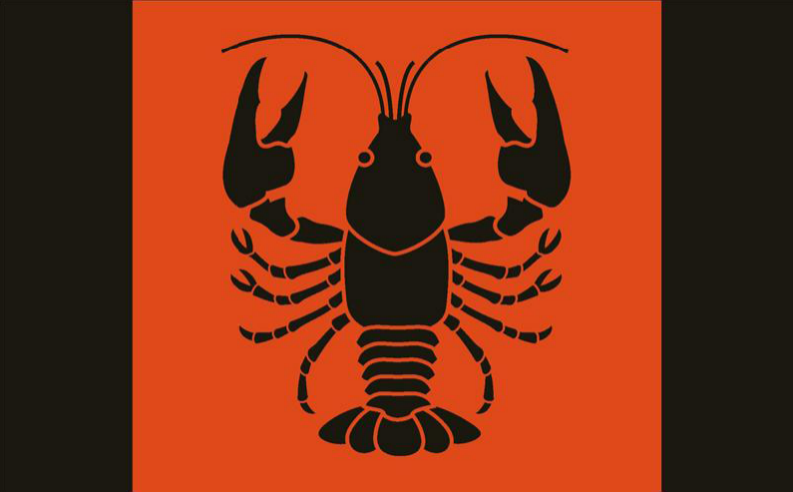
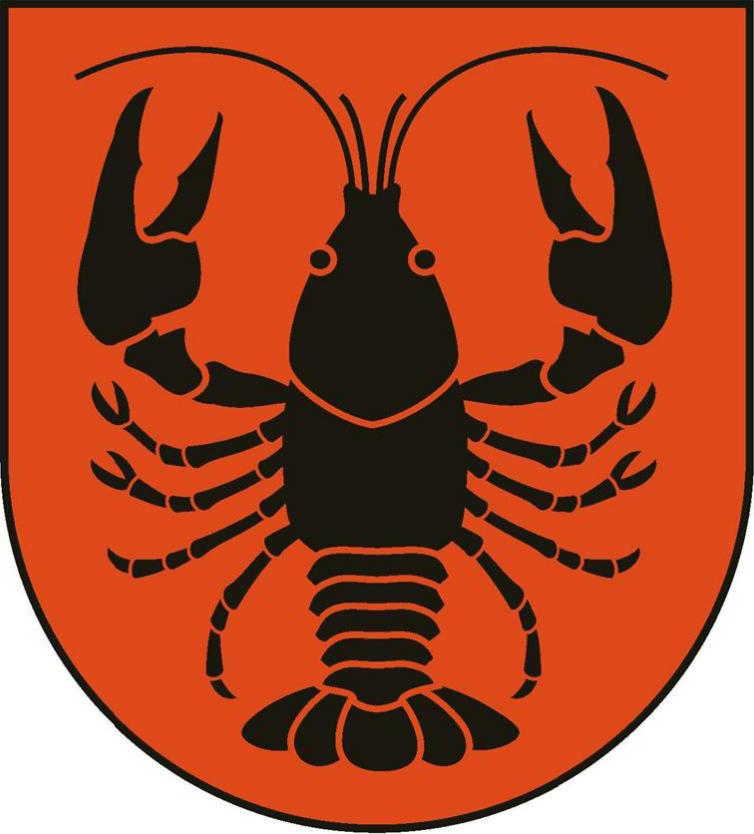
- Flag Coat of arms

- Gmina Filipów within the Suwałki County
- Coordinates (Filipów): 54°10′50″N 22°37′15″E
- Country: Poland
- Voivodeship: Podlaskie
- County: Suwałki County
- Seat: Filipów

Area
  - Total: 150.35 km^{2} (58.05 sq mi)

Population (2006)
  - Total: 4,478
  - Density: 29.78/km^{2} (77.14/sq mi)
- Website: http://www.filipow.pl/

Gmina Filipów is a rural gmina (administrative district) in Suwałki County, Podlaskie Voivodeship, in north-eastern Poland. Its seat is the village of Filipów, which lies approximately 24 kilometres (15 mi) north-west of Suwałki and 124 km (77 mi) north of the regional capital Białystok.

The gmina covers an area of 150.35 square kilometres (58.1 sq mi), and as of 2006 its total population is 4,478.

== Neighbouring gminas ==
Gmina Filipów is bordered by the gminas of Bakałarzewo, Dubeninki, Gołdap, Kowale Oleckie, Olecko, Przerośl and Suwałki.

== Villages ==
The gmina contains the following villages having the status of sołectwo: Agrafinówka, Bartnia Góra, Bitkowo, Czarne, Czostków, Filipów (divided into four sołectwos: Filipów Pierwszy, Filipów Drugi, Filipów Trzeci and Filipów Czwarty), Garbas (divided into two sołectwos: Garbas Pierwszy and Garbas Drugi), Huta, Jemieliste, Mieruniszki, Nowa Dębszczyzna, Olszanka, Piecki, Rospuda, Smolenka, Stara Dębszczyzna, Stare Motule, Supienie, Szafranki, Tabałówka, Wólka and Zusno.
