= Prudziszki =

- Village
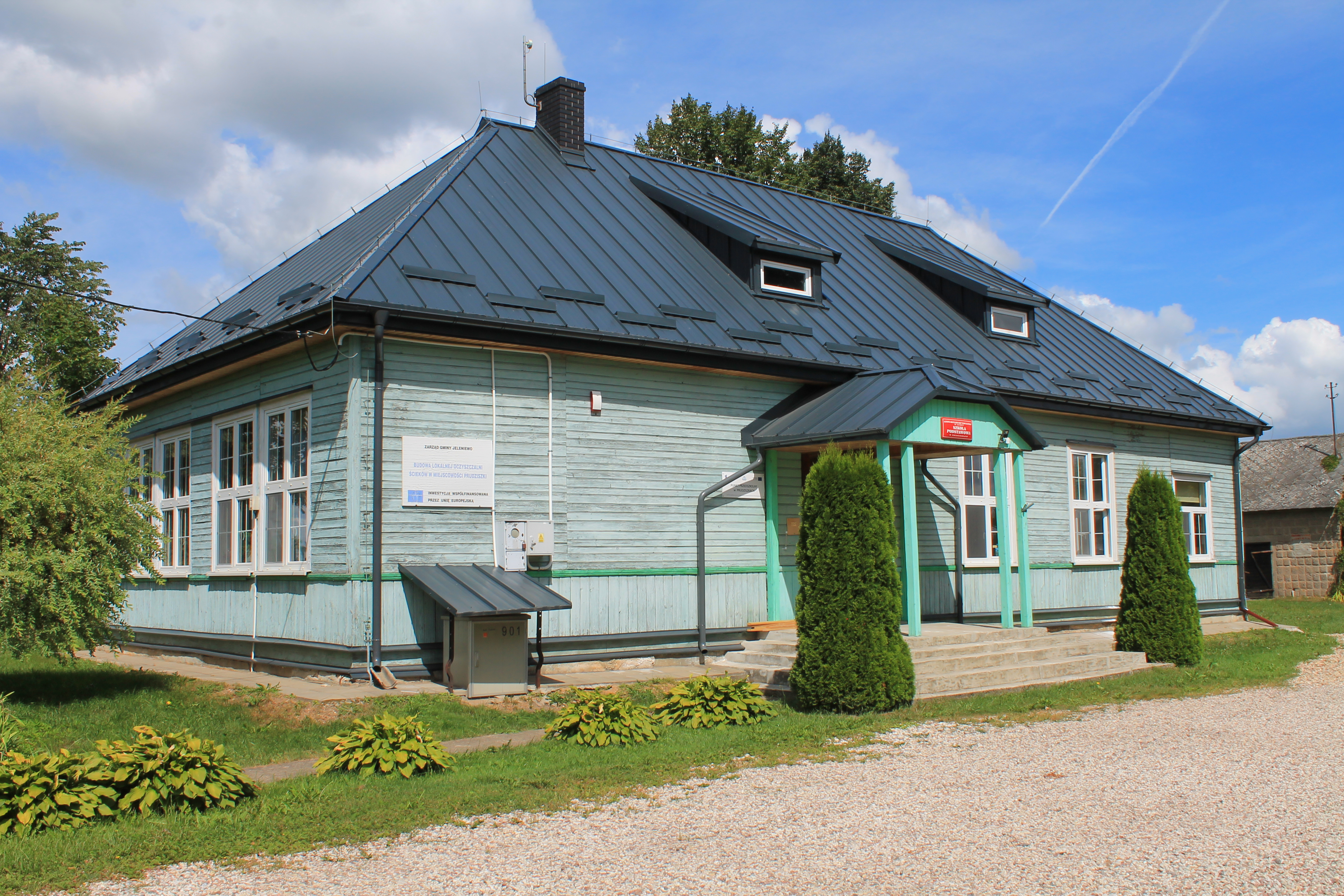
- Primary school in Prudziszki

- Location within Poland
- Coordinates: 54°10′N 22°55′E
- Country: Poland
- Voivodeship: Podlaskie
- County: Suwałki
- Gmina: Jeleniewo
- Time zone: UTC+1 (CET)
  - Summer (DST): UTC+2 (CEST)
- Postal code: 16-404

Prudziszki [pruˈd͡ʑiʂki] is a village in the administrative district of Gmina Jeleniewo, within Suwałki County, Podlaskie Voivodeship, in north-eastern Poland.

== History ==
According to the 1921 census, the village had a population of 293, entirely Polish by nationality and Roman Catholic by confession.

During the German occupation of Poland (World War II), on April 26, 1940, the Germans carried out a massacre of 13 Poles from the region in the forest of Prudziszki as part of the Intelligenzaktion. Among the murdered were teachers, a local official and a military officer.
