= Klonorejść =

- Village
- Location within Poland
- Coordinates: 54°12′N 23°3′E
- Country: Poland
- Voivodeship: Podlaskie
- County: Suwałki
- Gmina: Szypliszki

Klonorejść [klɔˈnɔrɛi̯ɕt͡ɕ] is a village in the administrative district of Gmina Szypliszki, within Suwałki County, Podlaskie Voivodeship, in north-eastern Poland, close to the border with Lithuania.
