= Gmina Rutka-Tartak =

Gmina Rutka-Tartak Rutka-Tartak Commune
- Gmina
- Coat of arms

- Gmina Rutka-Tartak within the Suwałki County
- Coordinates (Rutka-Tartak): 54°20′N 22°59′E
- Country: Poland
- Voivodeship: Podlaskie
- County: Suwałki County
- Seat: Rutka-Tartak

Area
  - Total: 89.95 km^{2} (34.73 sq mi)

Population (2006)
  - Total: 2,287
  - Density: 25.43/km^{2} (65.85/sq mi)
- Vehicle registration: BSU
- Website: https://rutka-tartak.com.pl/

Gmina Rutka-Tartak is a rural gmina (administrative district) in Suwałki County, Podlaskie Voivodeship, in north-eastern Poland, on the Lithuanian border. Its seat is the village of Rutka-Tartak, which lies approximately 28 kilometres (17 mi) north of Suwałki and 136 km (85 mi) north of the regional capital Białystok.

The gmina covers an area of 89.95 square kilometres (34.7 sq mi), and as of 2006 its total population is 2,287.

The gmina contains part of the protected area called Suwałki Landscape Park.

== Villages ==
Gmina Rutka-Tartak contains the villages and settlements of Baranowo, Bondziszki, Ejszeryszki, Folusz, Ignatowizna, Jałowo, Jasionowo, Jodoziory, Kadaryszki, Kleszczówek, Krejwiany, Kupowo, Lizdejki, Michałówka, Olszanka, Pobondzie, Polimonie, Postawele, Poszeszupie, Poszeszupie-Folwark, Potopy, Rowele, Rutka-Tartak, Sikorowizna, Smolnica, Smolniki, Trzcianka and Wierzbiszki.

== Neighbouring gminas ==
Gmina Rutka-Tartak is bordered by the gminas of Jeleniewo, Szypliszki and Wiżajny. It also borders Lithuania.
