= Piecki, Podlaskie Voivodeship =

Piecki
- Village
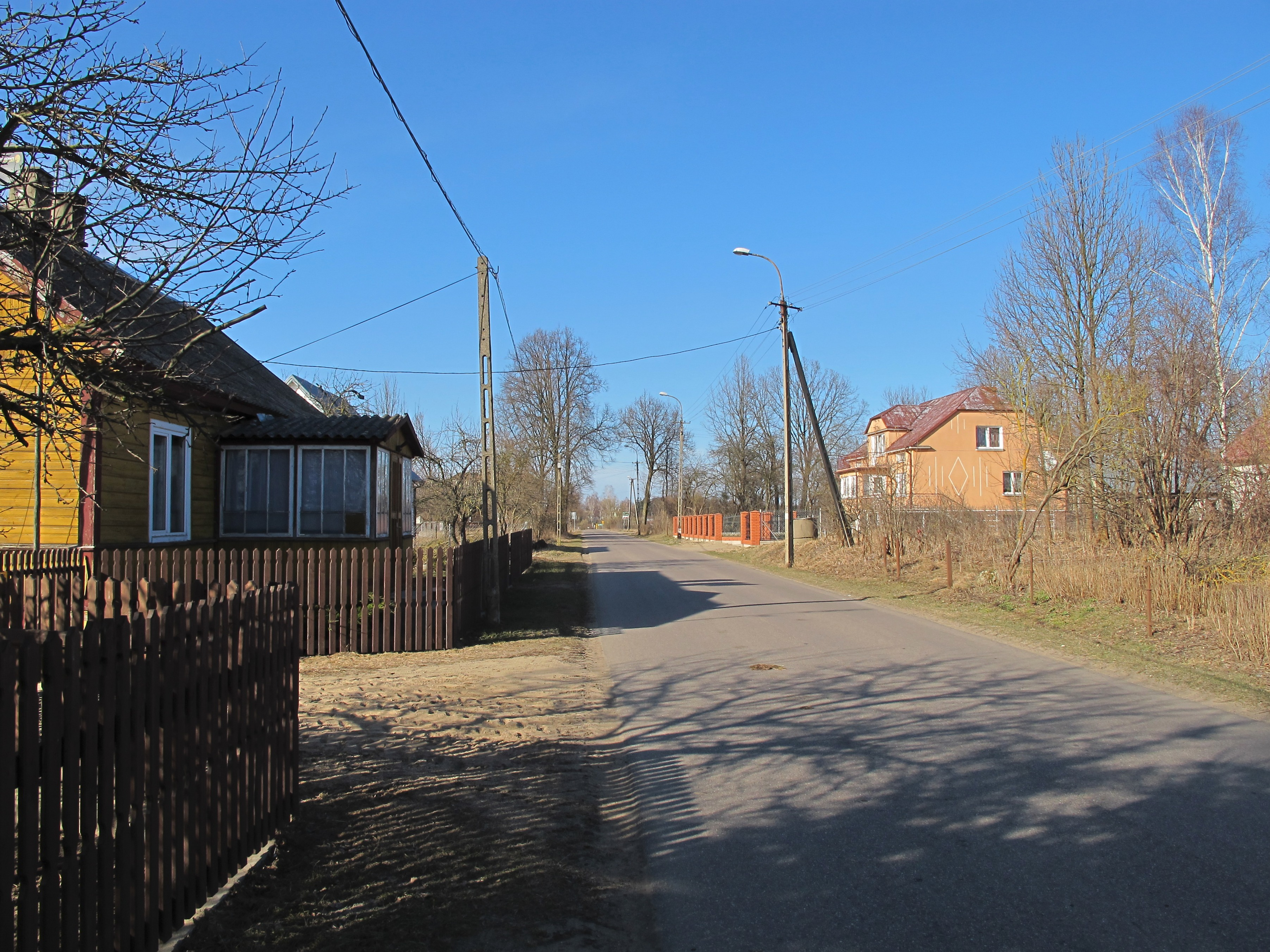

- Location within Poland
- Coordinates: 54°9′N 22°46′E
- Country: Poland
- Voivodeship: Podlaskie
- County: Suwałki
- Gmina: Filipów

Piecki [ˈpjɛt͡ski] is a village in the administrative district of Gmina Filipów, within Suwałki County, Podlaskie Voivodeship, in north-eastern Poland.
