= Grauże Stare =

Village in Gmina Szypliszki, Poland

- Village
- Location within Poland
- Coordinates: 54°13′06″N 23°04′40″E
- Country: Poland
- Voivodeship: Podlaskie
- County: Suwałki
- Gmina: Szypliszki
- Population: 30

Grauże Stare [ˈɡrau̯ʐɛ ˈstarɛ] is a village in the administrative district of Gmina Szypliszki, within Suwałki County, Podlaskie Voivodeship, in north-eastern Poland, close to the border with Lithuania.

In 2004 it had a population of 30.
