= Jasionowo, Gmina Szypliszki =

Jasionowo
- Village
- Location within Poland
- Coordinates: 54°09′19″N 22°58′17″E
- Country: Poland
- Voivodeship: Podlaskie
- County: Suwałki
- Gmina: Szypliszki

Jasionowo [jaɕɔˈnɔvɔ] is a village in the administrative district of Gmina Szypliszki, within Suwałki County, Podlaskie Voivodeship, in north-eastern Poland, close to the border with Lithuania.
