= Kaletnik, Podlaskie Voivodeship =

Kaletnik
- Village
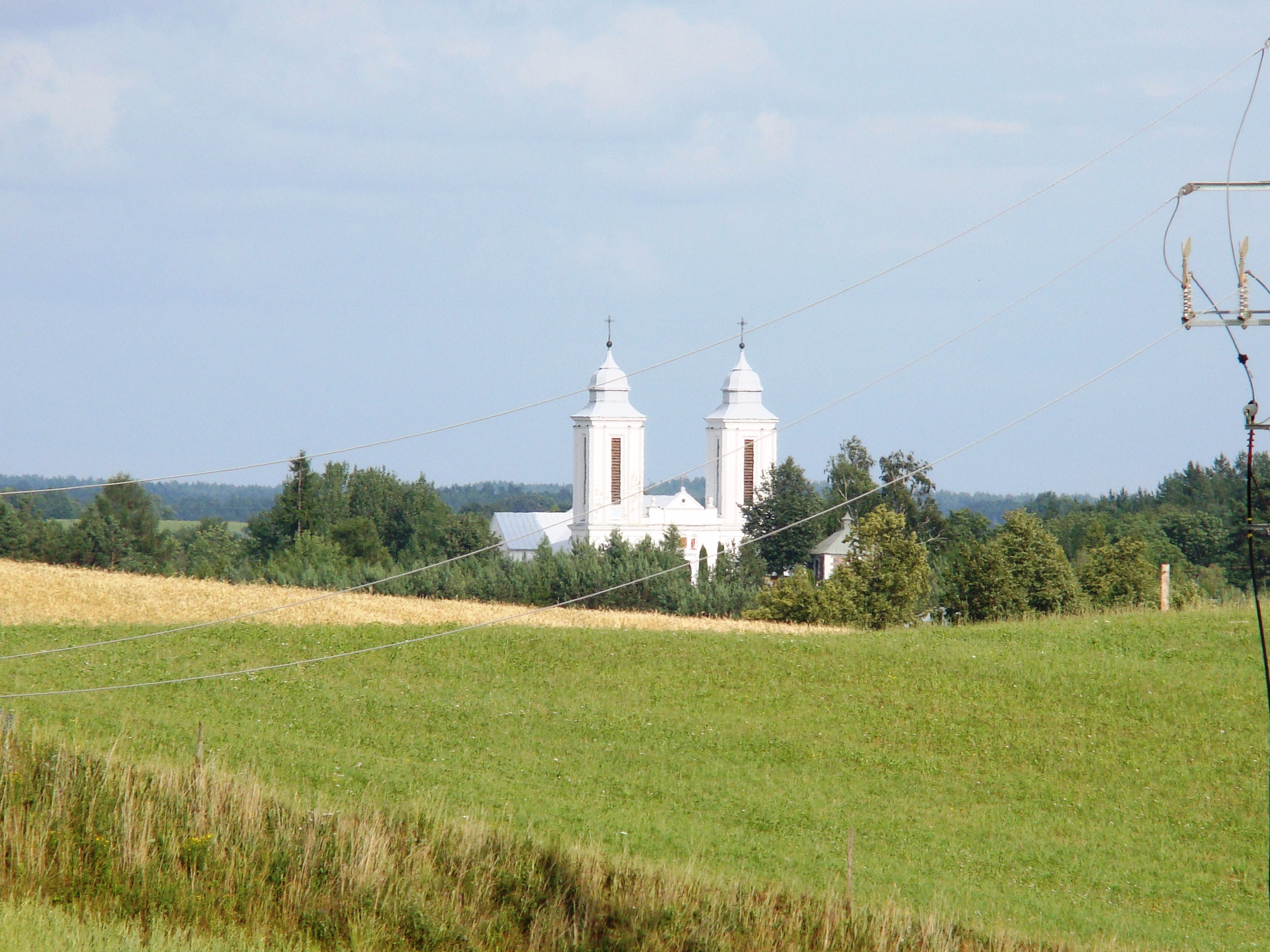
- View of Kaletnik with the Holy Spirit church in the middle

- Location within Poland
- Coordinates: 54°11′N 23°5′E
- Country: Poland
- Voivodeship: Podlaskie
- County: Suwałki
- Gmina: Szypliszki
- Time zone: UTC+1 (CET)
  - Summer (DST): UTC+2 (CEST)
- Postal code: 16-411
- Vehicle registration: BSU
- Website: kaletnik.podlasie.pl

Kaletnik ([kaˈlɛtnik]) is a village in the administrative district of Gmina Szypliszki, within Suwałki County, Podlaskie Voivodeship, in north-eastern Poland, close to the border with Lithuania.

== History ==
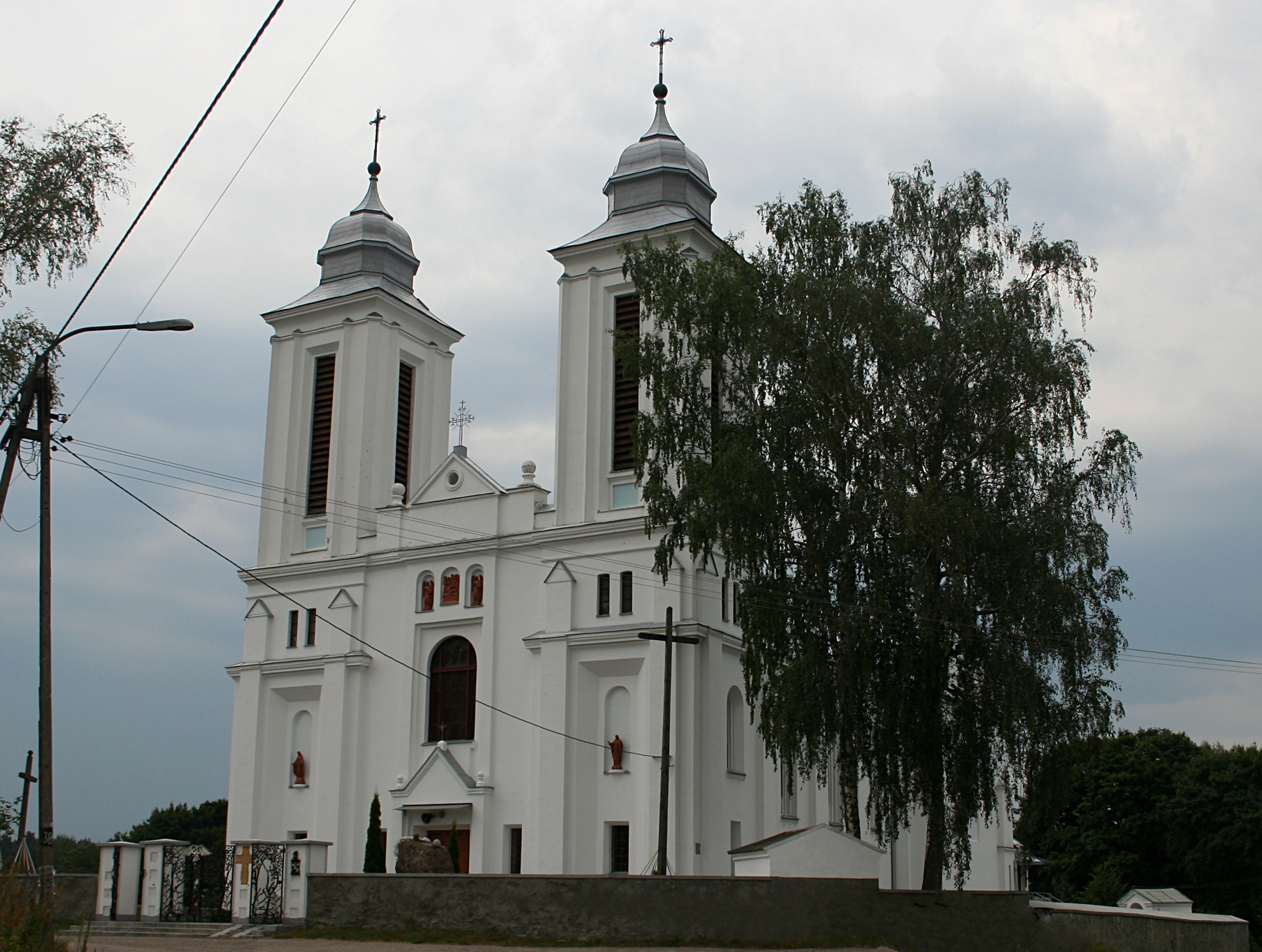
Holy Spirit church

The village was part of the Grand Duchy of Lithuania since it was founded. In the 18th century, Polish King Stanisław August Poniatowski established a Catholic parish in Kaletnik, and a wooden church located nearby was moved to the village.

In the Third Partition of Poland, in 1795, the town was annexed by Prussia, and in 1807 it passed to the newly formed Polish Duchy of Warsaw. After its disestablishment, in 1815, it passed to so-called Congress Poland within the Russian Partition of Poland. After the massacres of Polish protesters committed by the Russians in Warsaw in 1861, Polish demonstrations and clashes with Russian soldiers took place in Kaletnik. The local church was burned down during World War I in 1915, and afterwards a new brick church in the Neoclassical style was built. Another notable historic building is the cemetery chapel. After World War I, Poland regained independence and control of the village. According to the 1921 census, the village had a population of 192, entirely Polish by nationality and Roman Catholic by confession.

During the German occupation of Poland (World War II), on 7 April 1940, the Germans arrested Polish priest Władysław Młynarczyk in the village. He was initially imprisoned in Suwałki and then deported to the Soldau, Sachsenhausen and Dachau concentration camps. He died in Dachau in August 1942. Local Polish teachers were among 13 Poles massacred by the Germans in nearby Prudziszki on 26 April 1940 (see Nazi crimes against the Polish nation).
