= Rutka-Tartak =

- Village
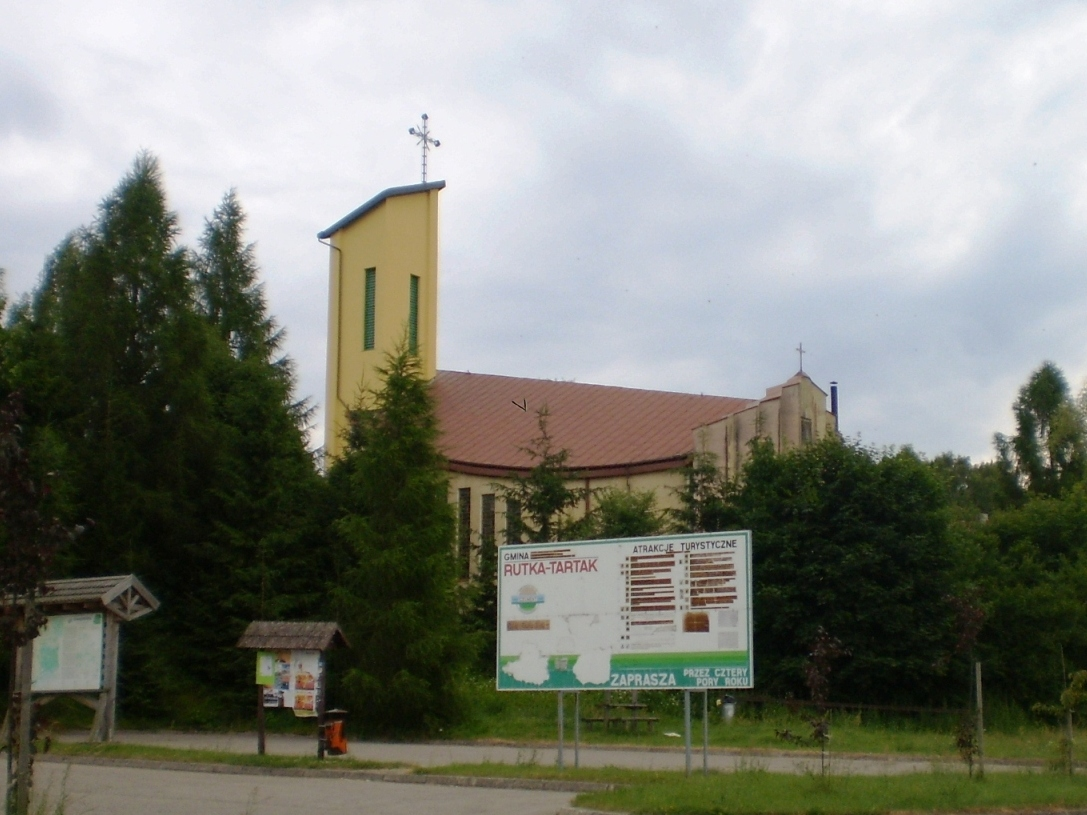
- Church of Our Lady Queen of Poland

- Location within Poland
- Coordinates: 54°20′N 22°59′E
- Country: Poland
- Voivodeship: Podlaskie
- County: Suwałki
- Gmina: Rutka-Tartak

Population
  - Total: 410
- Vehicle registration: BSU

Rutka-Tartak [ˈrutka ˈtartak] is a village in Suwałki County, Podlaskie Voivodeship, in north-eastern Poland, close to the border with Lithuania. It is the seat of the gmina (administrative district) called Gmina Rutka-Tartak.
