= Gmina Szypliszki =

Gmina Szypliszki Szypliszki Commune
- Gmina
- Flag Coat of arms

- Gmina Szypliszki within the Suwałki County
- Coordinates (Szypliszki): 54°15′N 23°4′E
- Country: Poland
- Voivodeship: Podlaskie
- County: Suwałki County
- Seat: Szypliszki

Area
  - Total: 156.55 km^{2} (60.44 sq mi)

Population (2006)
  - Total: 4,008
  - Density: 25.60/km^{2} (66.31/sq mi)
- Website: http://www.niemen.org.pl/gminy/szypliszki/

Gmina Szypliszki, is a rural gmina (administrative district) in Suwałki County, Podlaskie Voivodeship, in north-eastern Poland, on the Lithuanian border. Its seat is the village of Szypliszki, which lies approximately 21 kilometres (13 mi) north-east of Suwałki and 126 km (78 mi) north of the regional capital Białystok.

The gmina covers an area of 156.55 square kilometres (60.4 sq mi), and as of 2006 its total population is 4,008.

== Villages ==
Gmina Szypliszki contains the villages and settlements of:

- Adamowizna
- Aleksandrówka
- Andrzejewo
- Becejły
- Białobłota
- Bilwinowo
- Budzisko
- Czerwonka
- Dębniak
- Dębowo
- Deksznie
- Fornetka
- Głęboki Rów
- Grauże Stare
- Jasionowo
- Jegliniec
- Jeziorki
- Kaletnik
- Klonorejść
- Kociołki
- Krzywólka
- Kupowo-Folwark
- Lipniak
- Lipowo
- Łowocie
- Majdan
- Mikołajówka
- Nowe Grauże
- Olszanka
- Podwojponie
- Pokomsze
- Polule
- Postawelek
- Przejma Mała
- Przejma Wielka
- Przejma Wysoka
- Romaniuki
- Rybalnia
- Sadzawki
- Sitkowizna
- Słobódka
- Szelment
- Szury
- Szymanowizna
- Szypliszki
- Węgielnia
- Wesołowo
- Wiatrołuża Druga
- Wojponie
- Wygorzel
- Zaboryszki
- Żubryn
- Żyrwiny

== Neighbouring gminas ==
Gmina Szypliszki is bordered by the city of Suwałki and by the gminas of Jeleniewo, Krasnopol, Puńsk, Rutka-Tartak and Suwałki. It also borders Lithuania.
