= 1921 Polish census =

Polish census of 1921
- 1921 Census of Poland, vol. 31: Population by Religion and Nationality (go to p. 80: PDF)

The Polish census of 1921 or First General Census in Poland (Polish: Pierwszy Powszechny Spis Ludności) was the first census in the Second Polish Republic, performed on September 30, 1921, by the Main Bureau of Statistics (Główny Urząd Statystyczny). It was followed by the Polish census of 1931.

== Content ==
Due to war, not all of interwar Poland was enumerated. Upper Silesia was formally assigned to Poland by the League of Nations after the census was conducted elsewhere. Meanwhile, the conditions in eastern Galicia were still unstable and chaotic, and the census data had to be adjusted after the fact, wrote Joseph Marcus, thus leading to more questions than answers. The army and personnel under military jurisdiction were not included in the results. Also, specific areas of considerable size lacked complete returns due to absence of war refugees.

Entire categories considered essential today were absent from the questionnaires, subject to historic interpretation at any given time. For example, the Ukrainian ethnicity was not surveyed. The census followed all previous Habsburg censuses and surveyed only the Rusyns (as Ruthenes) with the only possible distinguishing factor for Ukrainians being religion. Within a single total number of Ruthenes (narodowość rusińska), separate categories existed only for Greek Catholics (68.4 percent or 2,667,840 of them) and Orthodox Christians (31 percent or 1,207,739 of the total),^{[page 80]} but did not address language in the same way as the next Polish census of 1931. Neither the Ukrainians, Carpatho-Rusyns (or Rusnaks), nor Polesians were defined by their name. The categories listed in the census included verbatim: Narodowość: polska (polonais), rusińska (ruthènes), żydowska (juifs), białoruska (biėlorusses), niemiecka (allemands), litewska (lithuaniens), rosyjska (russes), tutejsza (indigène), czeska (tchèques), inna (autre), niewiadoma (inconnue).

Some scholars claim that minorities had been undercounted, with some claiming as much as 40% of Poland's population was a minority, 18 percent Ukrainian, 10 percent Jewish, 6 percent Byelorussian, and 5 percent German.

== Results ==
=== Nationality ===
Religion/Nationality	Total	Poles	Ruthenians	Jews	Belarusians	Germans	Lithuanians	Russians	Local peoples	Czechs	Others	Not specified
Total	25,694,700	17.789.287	3.898.428	2.048.878	1.035.693	769.392	24.044	48.920	38.943	30.628	9.856	631
Roman Catholics	16.057.229	15.850.890	16.239	1.316	60.123	94.017	21.639	1.144	113	7.398	4.310	40
Greek Catholics	3.031.057	361.294	2,667,840	125	197	383	6	0	348	32	325	3
Orthodox	2.815.817	545.457	1.207.739	140	960.539	303	2.227	3.597	38.135	18.404	891	14
Jews	2,771,949	707.400	3.751	2.044.637	3.983	9937	74	1.081	346	91	644	5
Protestants	940.234	274.471	1.992	300	205	656.865	76	12	1	3.952	1.968	31
Mariavites	33.003	32.865	9	5	5	111	1	41.968	0	4	3	0
Ost. Orthodox	21.707	7.875	47	2	10.078	50	6	373	0	0	51	1
Evangelicals	12.426	3.374	720	41	41	7.375	3	178	0	726	133	1
Beyond Confessions	5.972	3.309	50	2.287	10	135	7	46	0	17	111	0
Other non-Christians	4.397	2.098	35	16	510	173	2	191	0	1	1.370	1
Not specified	909	254	6	9	2	43	3	4	0	3	50	535

All	Polish	Ruthenians	Jewish	Belarusian	German	Lithuanian	Russian	Tutejszy	Czech	other	unknown
25.694.700	17.789.287	3.898.428	2.048.878	1.035.693	769.392	24.044	48.920	38.943	30.628	9.856	631
100%	69,23%	15,17%	7,97%	4,03%	2,99%	0,09%	0,19%	0,15%	0,12%	0,04%	~0,002%

=== Religion ===
All	Roman Catholics	Greco Catholics	Other Catholic (Mariavite and others)	Orthodox	Other Eastern Christians	Evangelicals	Other Evangelicals	Jews	Other Non-Christians	Agnostics	Unknown
25 694 700	16 057 229	3 031 057	33 003	2 815 817	21 707	940 234	12 426	2 771 949	4 397	5 972	909
