= Suwałki County =

Suwałki County Powiat suwalski
- County
- Flag Coat of arms

- Location within the voivodeship
- Coordinates (Suwałki): 54°5′N 22°56′E
- Country: Poland
- Voivodeship: Podlaskie
- Seat: Suwałki
- Gminas: Total 9: Gmina Bakałarzewo; Gmina Filipów; Gmina Jeleniewo; Gmina Przerośl; Gmina Raczki; Gmina Rutka-Tartak; Gmina Suwałki; Gmina Szypliszki; Gmina Wiżajny

Area
  - Total: 1,307.31 km^{2} (504.76 sq mi)

Population (2019)
  - Total: 35,689
  - Density: 27.300/km^{2} (70.706/sq mi)
- Car plates: BSU
- Website: www.powiat.suwalski.pl

Suwałki County (Polish: powiat suwalski) is a unit of territorial administration and local government (powiat) in Podlaskie Voivodeship, north-eastern Poland, on the Lithuanian border. It came into being on January 1, 1999, as a result of the Polish local government reforms passed in 1998. Its administrative seat is the city of Suwałki, although the city is not part of the county (it constitutes a separate city county); there are no towns within the county.

The county covers an area of 1,307.31 square kilometres (504.8 sq mi). As of 2019 its total population is 35,689. It includes the protected area known as Suwałki Landscape Park.

== Neighbouring counties ==
Apart from the city of Suwałki, Suwałki County is also bordered by Sejny County to the east, Augustów County to the south, Ełk County to the south-west, and Olecko County and Gołdap County to the west. It also borders Lithuanian Kalvarija Municipality and Vilkaviškis District Municipality to the north.

== Administrative divisions ==
The county is subdivided into nine gminas. These are listed in the following table, in descending order of population.

Gmina	Type	Area (km^{2})	Population (2019)	Seat
Gmina Suwałki	rural	264.8	7,706	Suwałki *
Gmina Raczki	rural	142.3	5,895	Raczki
Gmina Filipów	rural	150.4	4,332	Filipów
Gmina Szypliszki	rural	156.6	3,883	Szypliszki
Gmina Jeleniewo	rural	131.8	3,140	Jeleniewo
Gmina Bakałarzewo	rural	123.0	3,116	Bakałarzewo
Gmina Przerośl	rural	123.8	2,937	Przerośl
Gmina Wiżajny	rural	122.6	2,358	Wiżajny
Gmina Rutka-Tartak	rural	92.3	2,322	Rutka-Tartak
* seat not part of the gmina
