= EV11 East Europe Route =

Long-distance cycle route from Norway to Greece

EuroVelo 11
- Length: 6,750 km (4,190 mi)
- Location: Norway, Finland, Estonia, Latvia, Lithuania, Poland, Slovakia, Hungary, Serbia, North Macedonia and Greece
- Designation: EuroVelo (EV11)
- Trailheads: North Cape, Norway; Athens, Greece
- Use: Cycling
- Website: en.eurovelo.com/ev11

Trail map
- Map of EuroVelo 11 based on the route as of May 2009

EuroVelo 11 (EV11), officially the East Europe Route, is a European long-distance cycle route in the EuroVelo network, extending from North Cape in northern Norway to Athens in Greece. It crosses 11 countries and is approximately 6,750 km long according to the official EuroVelo website.

The route passes through seven national capitals: Helsinki, Tallinn, Vilnius, Warsaw, Belgrade, Skopje and Athens. Although the general description on the EuroVelo website lists six capitals and omits Tallinn, its dedicated Estonian route page explicitly identifies Tallinn as part of EV11.

The route links geographically diverse regions of Europe, including the Barents Sea coast, Lapland, the Finnish lake district, the Baltic states, the Central European Plain, the Carpathian Mountains, the Tisza basin, the Balkan Peninsula and the Aegean Sea coast. The official EuroVelo route includes both completed sections and sections under development or at the planning stage.

== Characteristics ==
EuroVelo 11 follows a broadly north–south alignment, connecting northern, central and southeastern Europe. It passes through widely varying landscapes, from the subarctic areas of northern Norway and Finnish Lapland, through the lake districts of Finland and the Baltic states, the lowlands of east-central Europe and the Carpathians, to the Balkan Peninsula and the Aegean coast. It includes mountainous, hilly and lowland terrain, including extensive flat stretches in the Tisza valley in Hungary. The route passes through numerous protected areas, including national parks, Natura 2000 sites, forests and lake districts.

EV11 is not a continuous, physically separated cycleway. Rather, it is an international cycle-touring corridor using existing national and regional infrastructure. Sections run on cycle paths, local public roads, riverside routes and roads shared with other cycle routes. In Estonia, for example, EV11 follows parts of national cycle routes 1, 4 and 3; in Hungary it partly runs along embankments beside the Tisza; and in Poland's Lesser Poland Voivodeship it is known as VeloNatura and shares certain sections with VeloDunajec and EuroVelo 4.

Cycling conditions vary with the terrain, surface type, motor-vehicle traffic and state of infrastructure. In addition to developed and signed sections, some sections are only partially developed, unfinished or have an unknown development status. The official EuroVelo website therefore offers both a complete GPX route, including sections in development and planning, and a GPX download limited to sections classified as developed or certified.

A distinctive feature of EV11 is the ferry connection across the Gulf of Finland between Helsinki and Tallinn, providing continuity between the Finnish and Estonian sections. The crossing is approximately 80 km long.

Cycle-tourism services along EV11 are developed through national and regional cyclist-friendly schemes. These include Welcome Cyclist in Finland, Cyclist Welcome in Estonia, a Hungarian cyclist-friendly service network, and Miejsca Przyjazne Rowerzystom (Cyclist-Friendly Places, MPR) in Lesser Poland. Greece also has a Bike Friendly certification scheme. Depending on the country, these programmes cover accommodation, restaurants, bicycle rental and repair, tourist attractions and cyclist rest areas.

== Route ==
EuroVelo 11 passes from north to south through Norway, Finland, Estonia, Latvia, Lithuania, Poland, Slovakia, Hungary, Serbia, North Macedonia and Greece.

It begins at North Cape in northern Norway and continues through northern and central Finland to Helsinki. After crossing the Gulf of Finland by ferry, it follows routes through Estonia, Latvia and Lithuania. In Poland it extends from the Lithuanian border across central and southern Poland to the Slovak border. It then continues through Slovakia, Hungary, Serbia and North Macedonia, before reaching Athens in Greece.

=== Major cities and route connections ===
The following table presents the principal cities and junctions along EuroVelo 11 from north to south. In addition to major urban centres, it includes intersections with other EuroVelo routes, national and regional cycle routes, and the Helsinki–Tallinn ferry link. Some of the sections listed remain under development or planning.

Country	Main locations	Connections with other routes
Norway	North Cape, Porsangerfjorden, Finnmark	North Cape is the shared starting point of EuroVelo 1 (Atlantic Coast Route), EuroVelo 7 (Sun Route) and EuroVelo 11.
Finland	Lapland, the areas around Kuopio and Jyväskylä, Lahti, Helsinki	Helsinki: connection with EuroVelo 10 (Baltic Sea Cycle Route) and the ferry to Tallinn, connecting EV11 across the Gulf of Finland.
Estonia	Tallinn, Rakvere, Tartu, Otepää, Valga	Tallinn: junction of EuroVelo 10, EuroVelo 11 and EuroVelo 13 (Iron Curtain Trail). EV11 also follows portions of Estonian national cycle routes 1 (Tallinn–Rakvere), 4 (Rakvere–Tartu) and 3 (Tartu–Latvian border).
Latvia	Valka, Cēsis, Sigulda, Latgale region, Daugavpils	Valka/Valga: cross-border junction with Estonia. Daugavpils is a major urban centre on the southeastern Latvian section, before the route continues towards Lithuania.
Lithuania	Labanoras Regional Park, Vilnius, Trakai, Dzūkija National Park	Vilnius is the principal city on the Lithuanian EV11 route. The route then continues through Trakai and Dzūkija National Park towards the Polish border.
Poland	Ogrodniki, Sejny, Augustów, Łomża, Ostrołęka, Pułtusk, Warsaw, Radom, Kielce (in regional plans), Kraków, Stary Sącz, Muszyna	Warsaw: junction with EuroVelo 2 (Capitals Route). In Lesser Poland, EV11 is called VeloNatura and connects with EuroVelo 4 / VeloMetropolis, VeloDunajec and the Vistula Cycle Route.
Slovakia	Pieniny, Prešov, Košice	Prešov and Košice are the principal urban centres on the Slovak section connecting the route in Poland with its continuation into Hungary.
Hungary	Tornyosnémeti, Tokaj, Lake Tisza (Tisza-tó), Szeged	Szeged: connection with EuroVelo 13, which follows parts of the former Hungarian–Yugoslav border. Much of the Hungarian EV11 corridor follows the Tisza valley.
Serbia	Kanjiža, Zrenjanin, Belgrade, Požarevac, Ćuprija, Paraćin, Niš, Leskovac, Vranje	Belgrade: junction between EV11 and EuroVelo 6 (the Rivers Route, connecting the Atlantic and the Black Sea), which follows the Danube through Serbia. EV11 continues southward along the South Morava valley towards North Macedonia.
North Macedonia	Kumanovo, Skopje, Veles, the area around Miravci in Gevgelija Municipality, Star Dojran, Lake Doiran	Skopje is the principal urban junction on EV11 in North Macedonia. In the south, the published Bikemap route sections identify Miravci (Gevgelija Municipality) and Star Dojran before the route approaches Greece near Lake Doiran.
Greece	Lake Doiran (Doirani), Thessaloniki, Volos, Thebes, Chalkida, Athens	Athens: southern terminus of EV11 and a junction with EuroVelo 8 (Mediterranean Route).

=== Norway ===
The E69 road between Repvåg and the Nordkapp Tunnel on the northern EV11 section (2015).

EuroVelo 11 starts at North Cape, which is also the starting point for EuroVelo 1 and EuroVelo 7. From there it runs south along Porsangerfjorden, through Finnmark towards the Finnish border. The northern section crosses subarctic landscapes with sparse settlement, tundra and fjord scenery.

Road access from North Cape to mainland Norway uses European route E69 and the undersea North Cape Tunnel (Nordkapptunnelen), connecting the island of Magerøya to the mainland beneath the Magerøysundet strait. The tunnel is 6,871 m long and reaches 212 m below sea level. It opened in 1999.

=== Finland ===
A ferry on the Helsinki–Tallinn route across the Gulf of Finland (2014), linking the Finnish and Estonian sections of EV11.

The Finnish section of EV11 is approximately 1,600 km long and crosses the country from north to south. It passes through Lapland, the lake districts of central Finland, areas around Kuopio and Jyväskylä, and the Lahti region before reaching Helsinki. The landscapes include extensive forests, sparsely populated areas, glacial landforms and lakes.

The Helsinki–Tallinn ferry crossing, approximately 80 km across the Gulf of Finland, provides continuity between the Finnish and Estonian sections.

=== Estonia ===
In Estonia, EV11 follows existing national cycle routes. From Tallinn it follows national cycle route 1 along the northern coast to Rakvere, then turns south and follows route 4 to Tartu. It continues along route 3 towards the Latvian border near Valga.

In southern Estonia, the route passes around Otepää, close to Karula National Park. The Estonian section encompasses coastal areas, forests, lakes and the rolling terrain of southern Estonia.

=== Latvia ===
The Latvian section runs from the Estonian border near Valga to Daugavpils and is approximately 660 km long. In central Latvia it passes through the historic towns of Cēsis and Sigulda before turning southeast.

Approximately half of the Latvian section lies in Latgale, a region noted for its many lakes, including Lake Lubāns, Latvia's largest lake. The route also passes through protected landscapes, including national parks and a biosphere reserve.

=== Lithuania ===
EuroVelo 11 crosses eastern Lithuania near the border with Belarus. From the Latvian border it runs south through forests and lake districts, including Labanoras Regional Park, before reaching Vilnius.

The route then passes through Trakai, known for its castle on an island in Lake Galvė, and Dzūkija National Park before approaching the Polish border.

According to the Lithuanian Cyclists' Community (Lietuvos dviratininkų bendrija), the proposed Lithuanian EV11 section is approximately 500 km long. The published route breakdown gives about 80% paved roads, 17% gravel roads and 3% forest roads. In that account, the route is described as not fully developed and without EuroVelo signs.

According to ECF, Labanoras Regional Park contains about 70 lakes. The Vilnius Historic Centre, through which EV11 passes, is included in the UNESCO World Heritage List.

=== Poland ===
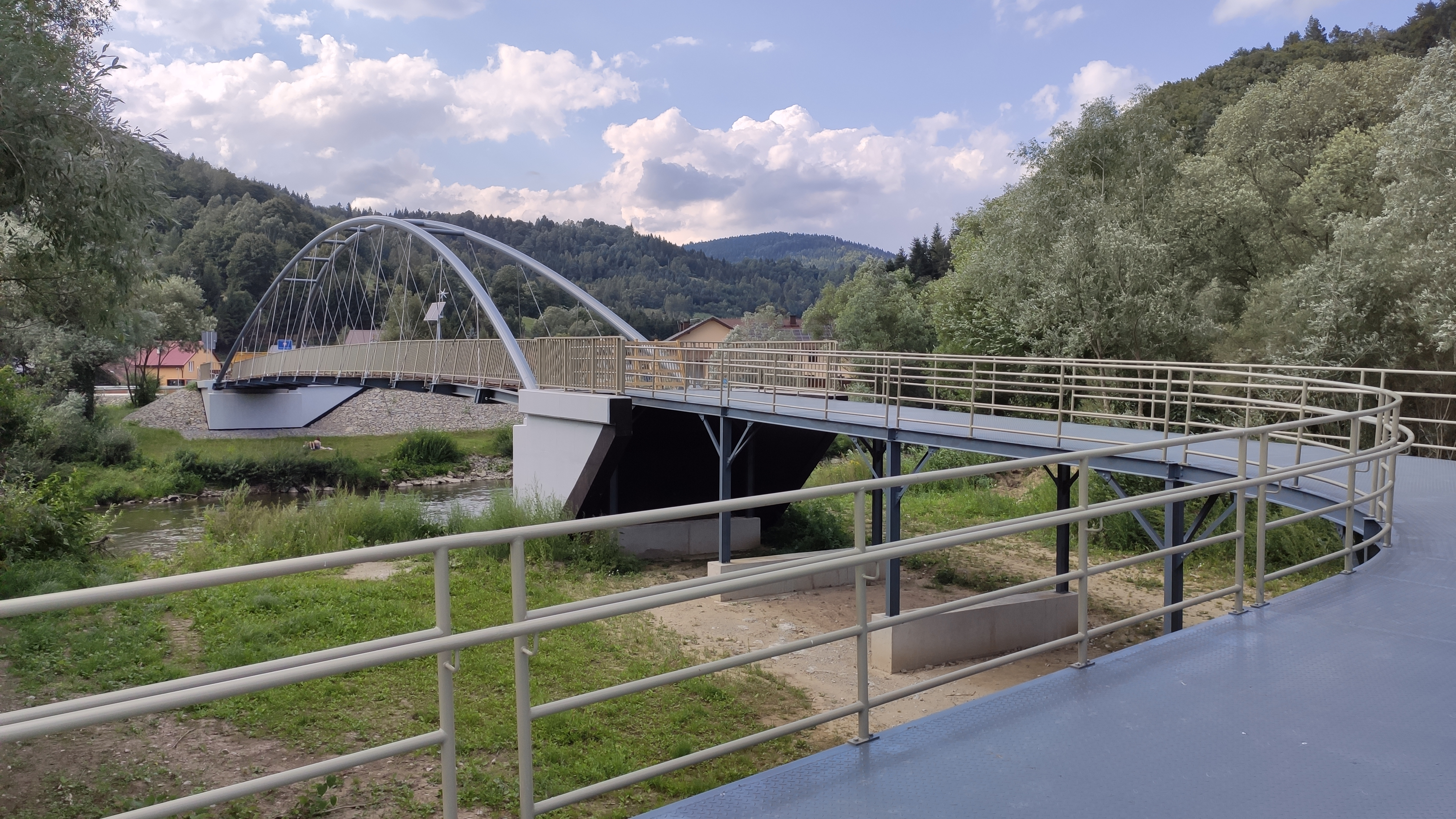
Pedestrian and cycle bridge across the Poprad between Milik, Poland, and Legnava, Slovakia, near the southern EV11 corridor (2020).

The Polish section runs from the Lithuanian border in the northeast to the Slovak border near Muszyna. It passes through four voivodeships: Podlaskie, Masovian, Świętokrzyskie and Lesser Poland.

The official EuroVelo website gives a length of approximately 762 km for the Polish route. It runs from the northeast to the south, passing through Warsaw and Kraków before entering the Carpathian region.

==== Podlaskie Voivodeship ====
Older descriptions of the international R11 cycle route place its northern Polish starting point at the Lithuanian border in Ogrodniki, with a route through the Sejny area, Wigry National Park, the vicinity of Stary Folwark and Augustów towards Łomża. The national park's description of R11 identifies the Ogrodniki–Łomża corridor, but does not establish that the entire historic alignment matches the present ECF GPX track.

Within Wigry National Park the existing R11 route runs through, among other places, Bryzgiel, Płociczno, Leszczewek, Stary Folwark, Wigry, Czerwony Folwark and Rosochaty Róg.

Around Augustów, the historically signposted R11 route runs through Bryzgiel, Monkinie, Kopanica, Dalny Las, Serwy, Sucha Rzeczka, Studzieniczna, Wojciech, Augustów, Białobrzegi, Kopiec, Sosnowo and Tajenko.

The alignment of the historic, locally signposted R11 does not necessarily coincide with the latest ECF EuroVelo track throughout. ECF periodically updates its routes, and its published maps and GPX files are the reference for current alignment.

==== Masovian Voivodeship ====
According to the regional cycle-route development concept for the Masovian Voivodeship, the EV11 corridor in the region is about 360 km long and follows this sequence:

Podlaskie border – Ostrołęka – Różan – Pułtusk – Zegrze – Warsaw – Góra Kalwaria – Mniszew – Ryczywół – Kozienice – Jedlnia – Radom – Szydłowiec – Świętokrzyskie border.

North of Warsaw, the corridor roughly follows the Narew valley, passing through Ostrołęka, Różan, Pułtusk and Zegrze. Between Zegrze and Warsaw it approaches the Żerań Canal.

South of Warsaw, the planned route passes through Góra Kalwaria, Kozienice, Radom and Szydłowiec. In the Masovian planning document this southern section partly overlaps with route No. 6, called a national route within that document's numbering system; the designation does not denote a separately established nationwide statutory network of numbered cycling routes.

==== Świętokrzyskie Voivodeship ====
In Świętokrzyskie Voivodeship the planned EV11 corridor runs broadly north–south between the Masovian and Lesser Poland borders. A corridor concept adopted by the Świętokrzyskie Voivodeship Board in March 2022 envisaged a main route approximately 244 km long, as well as two alternative corridors.

The 2022 concept traced the main corridor, from the Lesser Poland border northwards, through Lekszyce, Kazimierza Wielka, Koniecmosty (near Wiślica), Chroberz, Pińczów, Umianowice, Hajdaszek, Chmielnik, Raków, Cedzyna, Kielce, Stąporków and Niekłań Wielki towards Masovia. The southern portion crosses the Ponidzie region, near Busko-Zdrój; this does not imply that it passes through the town centre. The plan also described a northern alternative via Święta Katarzyna, Suchedniów and Skarżysko-Kamienna, and a southern alternative passing through Motkowice.

According to the 2022 concept, approximately 37 km between Lekszyce, Kazimierza Wielka and Koniecmosty had been constructed at that time. Some other parts had been partly built, and the proposed corridor should not be interpreted as evidence that the entire route had been completed or signed. The existing Lekszyce–Wiślica section partly follows a former narrow-gauge railway alignment.

==== Lesser Poland Voivodeship ====
A cyclists' rest area at Wola Batorska on the section shared by VeloNatura and VeloMetropolis (2020).

In Lesser Poland, EV11 is known as VeloNatura. The planned section is approximately 271 km long, from the Slovak border at Muszyna to Kościelec on the border with Świętokrzyskie Voivodeship.

The route comprises several sections. An independent section runs from the Slovak border through Muszyna along the Poprad valley to Stary Sącz. From Stary Sącz to Ostrów, EV11 shares the route of VeloDunajec; from Ostrów towards Kraków it partly follows EuroVelo 4 and VeloMetropolis.

It then passes through Kraków and heads northeast through the vicinity of Proszowice to the Świętokrzyskie border.

Not all parts of VeloNatura have been built to the same standard. The Lesser Poland cycling portal publishes suggested detours for missing or unfinished sections.

According to the ECF's 2025 development report, 207 km of EV11 in Lesser Poland were classified as developed. An update to the VeloNatura dataset was one factor behind the increase in the share of developed portions of EV11 throughout the network.

=== Slovakia ===
EuroVelo 11 in Prešov near Pod Kalváriou Street (2020).

In Slovakia, EV11 runs from the Polish border through the Pieniny area and eastern Slovakia. Its principal cities include Prešov and Košice, after which it continues south towards Hungary.

In the northern Slovak section, EV11 passes through the Šariš region, including the towns of Lipany, Sabinov and Veľký Šariš, before reaching Prešov. These locations are identified on information boards listed by the northeastern Slovakia regional EV11 tourist website.

South of Košice, EV11 partly follows the Hornádska cyklomagistrála (Hornád cycle trunk route), designated 039, along the Hornád valley. It passes such places as Nižná Myšľa, Ždaňa and Trstené pri Hornáde towards the Slovak–Hungarian border near Skároš and Hollóháza. The number 039 is the Slovak domestic cycle-route designation of a route partially shared with EV11, not an alternative EuroVelo route number.

=== Hungary ===
EV11 beside the Tisza southeast of Csongrád, towards Szeged (2018).

The Hungarian section runs from Tornyosnémeti near Slovakia to Szeged in southern Hungary. Much of its alignment follows the Tisza basin, and in places it uses the crests of the river's flood-protection embankments.

Places on or near the route include the historic Tokaj wine region, Lake Tisza (Tisza-tó) and protected sites in the Natura 2000 network. Much of the route passes through the lowland scenery of the Tisza basin, including farmland, wetlands and riverside habitats.

In northern Hungary, EV11 crosses the foothills of the Zemplén Mountains, passing through the area of Kéked, Hollóháza, Füzérkomlós, Nyíri, Bózsva and Pálháza before reaching Sátoraljaújhely. Between Bózsva and Pálháza a cycle-path section follows the former trackbed of the Hegyközi kisvasút narrow-gauge railway. Its use by EV11 is described both by the Hungarian EuroVelo stage guide and by a guide to regional cycle route ZE7, which partly coincides with EV11.

Near Lake Tisza, the Hungarian EuroVelo website divides EV11 into stages including Tiszacsege–Tiszafüred and Tiszafüred–Kisköre. In this area the route follows the Tisza corridor and partly uses flood-protection embankments.

The local cycle network was expanded by the 6,565 m Poroszló–Tiszafüred section, opened on 18 June 2020, including dedicated cycle bridges. Completing this link made it possible to ride around the entire reservoir without sharing the road with motor vehicles. The lake cycling network includes a shorter loop of about 65–70 km and a longer loop of around 95 km; neither is identical in its entirety to the EV11 alignment.

=== Serbia ===
An EV11 cycle-route sign in Serbian Banat (2024).

In Serbia, EV11 begins near Kanjiža on the Hungarian border, continuing through Zrenjanin to Belgrade. It then runs south via Požarevac, Ćuprija and Paraćin to Niš.

South of Niš, the route passes around Leskovac and Vranje before leaving Serbia near Prohor Pčinjski Monastery, towards North Macedonia.

=== North Macedonia ===
EuroVelo 11 crosses North Macedonia from north to south through Kumanovo, Skopje and Veles. ECF's country description also mentions Gevgelija, but the route sections on Bikemap identify Miravci (in Gevgelija Municipality) and Star Dojran farther south. From the Star Dojran area, the indicated route approaches the Greek border near Lake Doiran, rather than directly using the crossing south of Gevgelija town.

=== Greece ===
The Greek section begins at the North Macedonian border near the village of Doirani and Lake Doiran, then heads towards Thessaloniki, one of Greece's largest cities.

Farther south, EV11 passes through eastern Greece and the Aegean coastal region, with views towards Mount Olympus and the Pelion mountain range. It passes through Volos, Thebes and Chalkida before entering Attica and ending in Athens.

According to the ECF's 2025 report, 747 km of the Greek EV11 section were included in its route-length calculations. Including the Greek section among developed routes made a substantial contribution to the reported overall increase in developed EV11 mileage that year.

== Development status ==
EuroVelo 11 is not completed along its entire length. Official ECF data distinguish certified, developed, partially developed and undeveloped or unknown sections.

=== Development up to 2025 ===
According to the EuroVelo Route Development Status Report 2025, EV11 recorded a 13-percentage-point increase in developed sections compared with 2024. More than 900 km of additional route length was counted as developed.

The change largely reflected the inclusion of 747 km in Greece and updated data on Polish sections, including 207 km in Lesser Poland. The reported increase therefore reflected both changes in route development and improvements in the coverage and currency of information supplied to ECF.

Using the route length of 6,922 km adopted in the 2025 report, development levels were reported as follows:

Category	Share of route length
Sections in planning	25%
Sections under development	27%
Developed, not signed with EuroVelo signs	20%
Developed and signed with EuroVelo signs	28%
EuroVelo-certified sections	0%

In total, 48% of EV11 was classified as developed, including 28% of the route length carrying EuroVelo signage.

=== Status in the 2026 report ===
In 2026, ECF revised its method of classifying EuroVelo route development. The new method considers continuity, motor-vehicle traffic, surface quality and the presence of EuroVelo signs. It introduced distinct categories for partially developed sections that are passable by bicycle but do not meet all requirements for a fully developed route.

The EuroVelo Route Development Status Report 2026 gave the following breakdown for EV11:

- 29% developed and signed with EuroVelo signs;
- 12% developed but without EuroVelo signs;
- 5% partially developed and signed;
- 13% partially developed and not signed;
- approximately 41% undeveloped, of unknown status or served by a public-transport link;
- 0% certified to the full EuroVelo standard.

Thus, approximately 41% of the route was classified as fully developed and approximately 59% as at least partially developed. EuroVelo signage was present along around 34% of the entire route.

The 2026 report used a route length of approximately 6,955 km for EV11, whereas the public EuroVelo website gives 6,750 km. The 2025 report had used 6,922 km.

Because the classification methodology changed in 2026, the development shares presented in the 2025 and 2026 reports are not directly comparable. The 2026 report provides a new baseline for tracking subsequent development of the network.

== Signage and standards ==
EuroVelo 11 route emblem.

EV11 signage near Csongrád, Hungary (2018).

EuroVelo route signs include a blue panel bearing a ring of yellow stars around a white route number. On EV11 the number shown is 11.

A developed EuroVelo section need not consist entirely of physically separated cycle tracks. EuroVelo also allows routes on low-traffic roads, provided that minimum requirements for safety, continuity and surface quality are met.

The classification system adopted in 2026 distinguishes the following categories:

- Certified – a route section certified under the European Certification Standard (ECS);
- Developed + Signed – a developed section with suitable cycling conditions and EuroVelo signs;
- Developed + Not Signed – a developed section without EuroVelo signs;
- Partially Developed + Signed – a partially developed section with EuroVelo signs;
- Partially Developed + Not Signed – a partially developed section without EuroVelo signs;
- Undeveloped / Unknown – an unbuilt section or one with undetermined development status;
- Public transport link – a public transport service, for example a ferry crossing, providing continuity along the route.

The categories are intended to help cyclists assess travelling conditions and distinguish sections suitable for most riders from those requiring more experience or detailed route planning.

ECF publishes two kinds of GPX track: a complete route, including sections under development or planning, and a track limited to developed and certified sections.

== Connections with other cycle routes ==
EuroVelo 11 crosses other long-distance cycle routes and in some places shares sections of road or cycleway with them, including EuroVelo 4 and VeloDunajec in Lesser Poland.

In Norway, EV11 shares its North Cape starting point with EuroVelo 1 and EuroVelo 7.

In Estonia, it uses sections of national cycle routes 1, 4 and 3.

In Poland, EV11 connects with:

- EuroVelo 2 in Warsaw;
- EuroVelo 4 in Lesser Poland;
- VeloDunajec;
- VeloMetropolis;
- the Vistula Cycle Route (Wiślana Trasa Rowerowa).

In parts of Lesser Poland, EV11 and EuroVelo 4 have a shared alignment. The southern Polish section also makes use of infrastructure being developed as part of the VeloMałopolska network.

== See also ==
- EuroVelo
