= Edward Wojda =

Polish wrestler

Edward Wojda (26 July 1941 in Żyliny – 21 March 1990 in Gdańsk) was a Polish wrestler who competed in the 1968 Summer Olympics and in the 1972 Summer Olympics.
