= Gmina Suwałki =

Gmina Suwałki Suwałki Commune
- Gmina
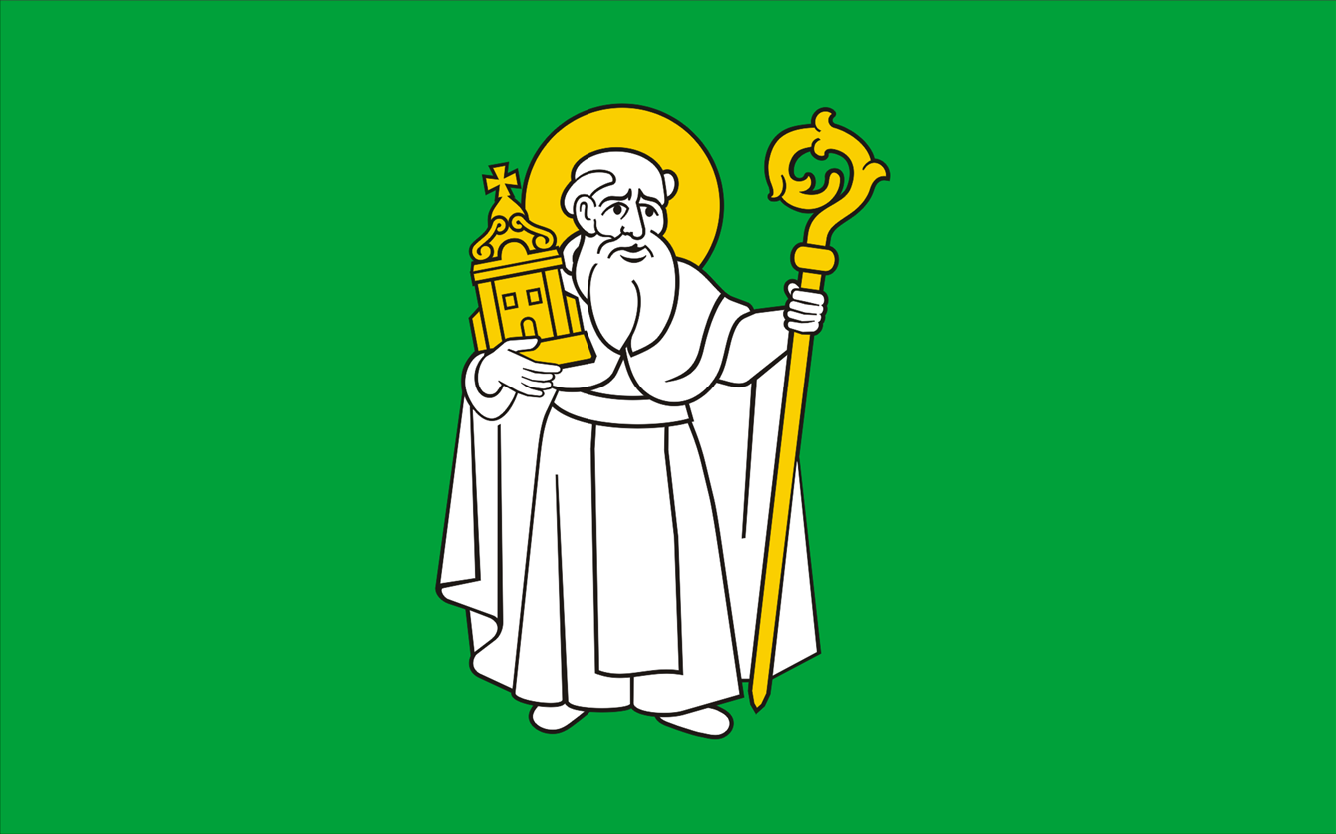
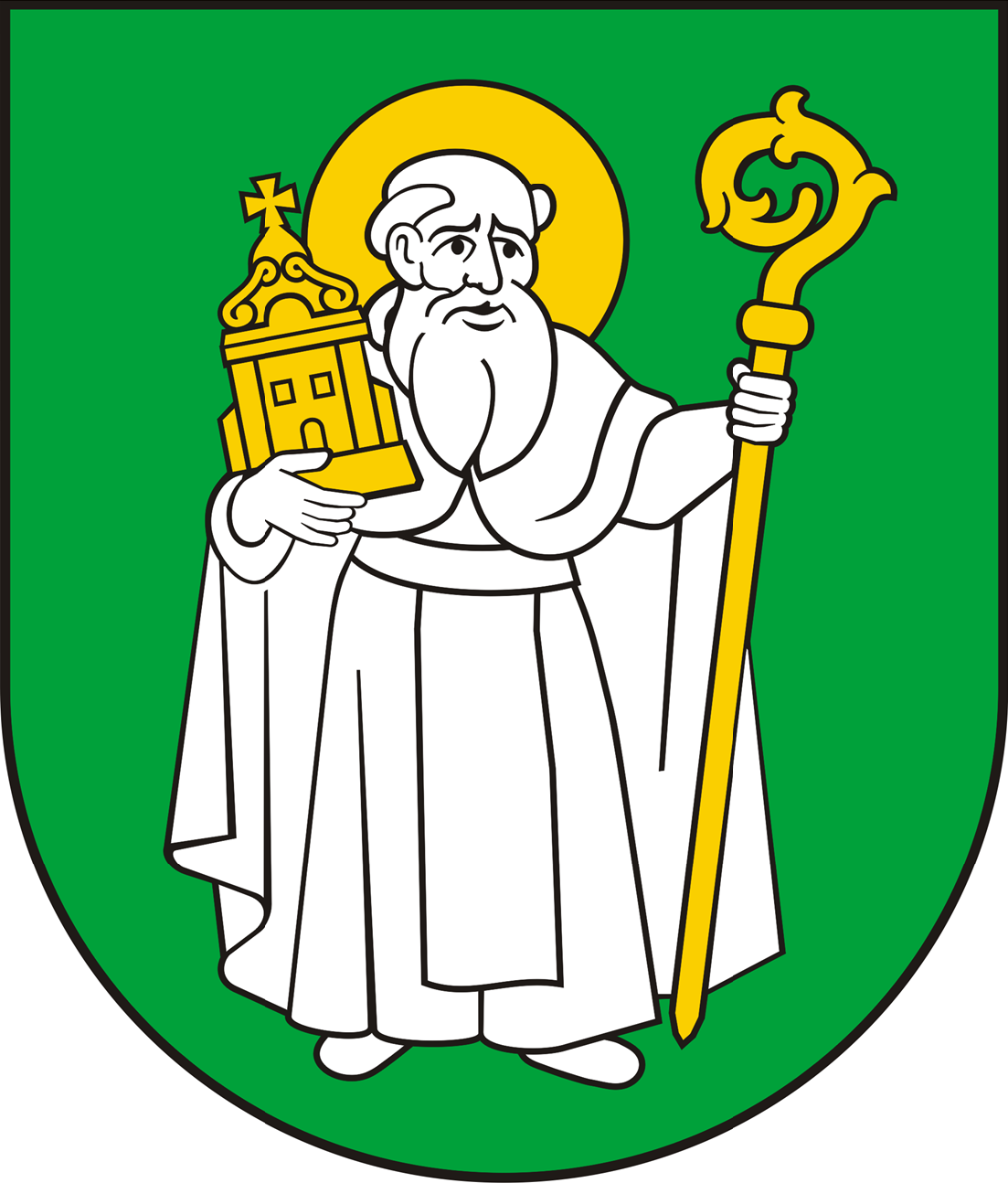
- Flag Coat of arms

- Gmina Suwałki within the Suwałki County
- Coordinates (Suwałki): 54°5′N 22°56′E
- Country: Poland
- Voivodeship: Podlaskie
- County: Suwałki County
- Seat: Suwałki

Area
  - Total: 264.82 km^{2} (102.25 sq mi)

Population (2008)
  - Total: 6,467
  - Density: 24.42/km^{2} (63.25/sq mi)
- Website: http://www.gmina.suwalki.pl

Gmina Suwałki is a rural gmina (administrative district) in Suwałki County, Podlaskie Voivodeship, in north-eastern Poland. Its seat is the town of Suwałki, although the town is not part of the territory of the gmina.

The gmina covers an area of 264.82 square kilometres (102.2 sq mi), and as of 2006 its total population is 6,388.

== Villages ==
Gmina Suwałki contains the villages and settlements of Biała Woda, Białe, Bobrowisko, Bród Mały, Bród Nowy, Bród Stary, Burdyniszki, Cimochowizna, Czarnakowizna, Czerwony Folwark, Dubowo Drugie, Dubowo Pierwsze, Gawrych-Ruda, Gielniewo, Huta, Korkliny, Korobiec, Kropiwne Nowe, Kropiwne Stare, Krzywe, Kuków, Kuków-Folwark, Leszczewek, Leszczewo, Lipniak, Magdalenowo, Mała Huta, Niemcowizna, Nowa Wieś, Okuniowiec, Osinki, Osowa, Piertanie, Płociczno-Osiedle, Płociczno-Tartak, Poddubówek, Potasznia, Przebród, Słupie, Sobolewo, Stara Turówka, Stary Folwark, Taciewo, Tartak, Trzciane, Turówka Nowa, Wasilczyki, Wasilczyki-Gajówka, Wiatrołuża Pierwsza, Wigry, Wychodne, Zielone Drugie, Zielone Kamedulskie, Zielone Królewskie and Żyliny.

== Neighbouring gminas ==
Gmina Suwałki is bordered by the city of Suwałki and by the gminas of Bakałarzewo, Filipów, Jeleniewo, Krasnopol, Nowinka, Przerośl, Raczki and Szypliszki.
