= Nowa Wieś, Gmina Suwałki =

Nowa Wieś
- Village
- Location within Poland
- Coordinates: 54°7′27″N 23°2′46″E
- Country: Poland
- Voivodeship: Podlaskie
- County: Suwałki
- Gmina: Suwałki
- Population: 190

Nowa Wieś [ˈnɔva ˈvjɛɕ] is a village in the administrative district of Gmina Suwałki, within Suwałki County, Podlaskie Voivodeship, in north-eastern Poland.
