= Lipniak, Gmina Suwałki =

Lipniak
- Village
- Location within Poland
- Coordinates: 54°08′26″N 23°03′11″E
- Country: Poland
- Voivodeship: Podlaskie
- County: Suwałki
- Gmina: Suwałki

Lipniak [ˈlipɲak] is a village in the administrative district of Gmina Suwałki, within Suwałki County, Podlaskie Voivodeship, in north-eastern Poland.
