= Stara Turówka =

- Village
- Location within Poland
- Coordinates: 54°08′38″N 22°49′37″E
- Country: Poland
- Voivodeship: Podlaskie
- County: Suwałki
- Gmina: Suwałki

Stara Turówka [ˈstara tuˈrufka] is a village in the administrative district of Gmina Suwałki, within Suwałki County, Podlaskie Voivodeship, in north-eastern Poland.
