= Wasilczyki-Gajówka =

- Village
- Location within Poland
- Coordinates: 54°04′04″N 22°48′50″E
- Country: Poland
- Voivodeship: Podlaskie
- County: Suwałki
- Gmina: Suwałki

Wasilczyki-Gajówka [vaɕilˈt͡ʂɨki ɡaˈjufka] is a village in the administrative district of Gmina Suwałki, within Suwałki County, Podlaskie Voivodeship, in north-eastern Poland.
