= Słupie, Gmina Suwałki =

Village in Gmina Suwałki, Poland

Słupie
- Village
- Location within Poland
- Coordinates: 54°01′30″N 23°02′47″E
- Country: Poland
- Voivodeship: Podlaskie
- County: Suwałki
- Gmina: Suwałki

Słupie [ˈswupjɛ] is a village in the administrative district of Gmina Suwałki, within Suwałki County, Podlaskie Voivodeship, in north-eastern Poland.
