= Gawrych-Ruda =

- Village
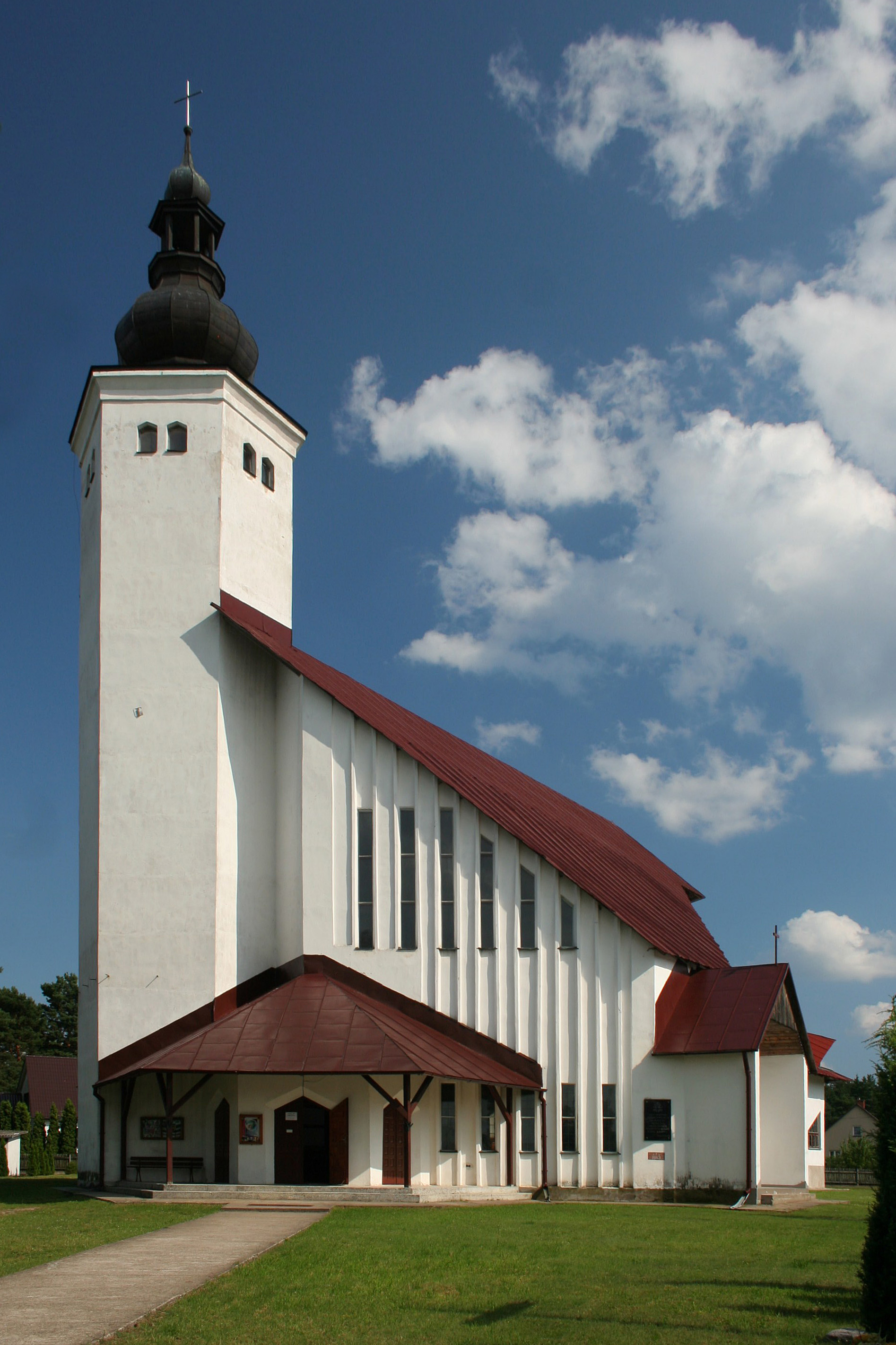
- Church of Maksymilian Kolbe in the village of Gawrych-Ruda

- Location within Poland
- Coordinates: 54°01′17″N 22°59′36″E
- Country: Poland
- Voivodeship: Podlaskie
- County: Suwałki
- Gmina: Suwałki
- Population: 310

Gawrych Ruda [ˈɡavrɨx ˈruda] is a village in the administrative district of Gmina Suwałki, within Suwałki County, Podlaskie Voivodeship, in north-eastern Poland.

It is also the location of the "PPS Młodzieżowy Ośrodek Edukacyjno-Wypoczynkowy „Zatoka Uklei” w Gawrych Rudzie" (Eng: PPS Youth Education-Vacation "Bleak Bay" Center in Gawrych-Ruda"), known for hosting the yearly "Oboz Szefa" between late July and early August.
