= Bród Stary =

Village in Gmina Suwałki, Poland

- Village
- Location within Poland
- Coordinates: 54°08′23″N 22°52′42″E
- Country: Poland
- Voivodeship: Podlaskie
- County: Suwałki
- Gmina: Suwałki

Bród Stary [ˈbrut ˈstarɨ] is a village in the administrative district of Gmina Suwałki, within Suwałki County, Podlaskie Voivodeship, in north-eastern Poland.
