= Kropiwne Stare =

- Village
- Location within Poland
- Coordinates: 54°6′N 22°48′E
- Country: Poland
- Voivodeship: Podlaskie
- County: Suwałki
- Gmina: Suwałki

Kropiwne Stare [krɔˈpivnɛ ˈstarɛ] is a village in the administrative district of Gmina Suwałki, within Suwałki County, Podlaskie Voivodeship, in north-eastern Poland.
