= Zielone Drugie =

- Village
- Location within Poland
- Coordinates: 54°03′15″N 22°51′02″E
- Country: Poland
- Voivodeship: Podlaskie
- County: Suwałki
- Gmina: Suwałki

Zielone Drugie (Polish pronunciation: [ʑɛˈlɔnɛ ˈdruɡʲɛ]) is a village in the administrative district of Gmina Suwałki, within Suwałki County, Podlaskie Voivodeship, in north-eastern Poland.
