= Magdalenowo =

- Village
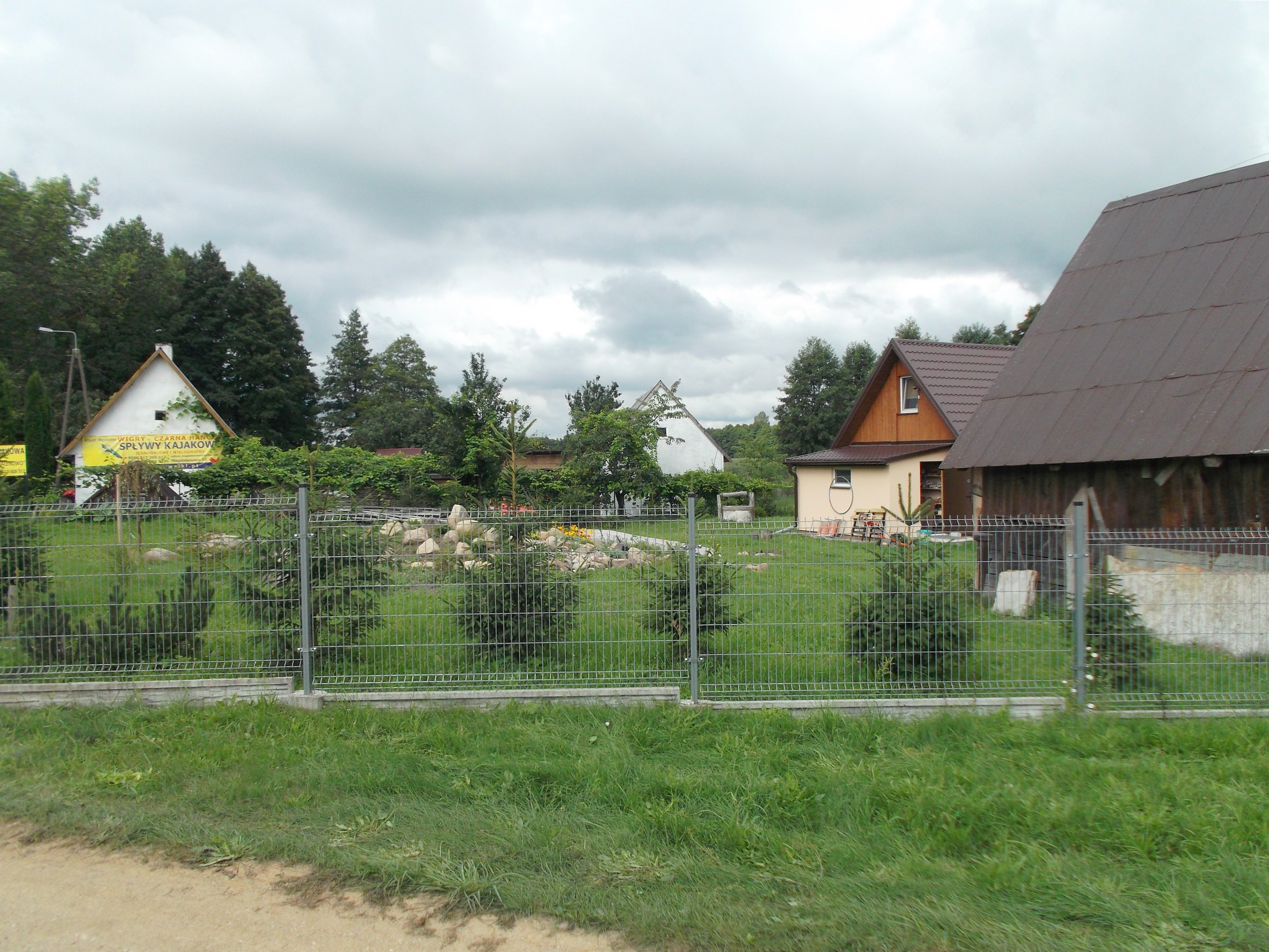

- Location within Poland
- Coordinates: 54°5′N 23°7′E
- Country: Poland
- Voivodeship: Podlaskie
- County: Suwałki
- Gmina: Suwałki
- Population: 20

Magdalenowo [maɡdalɛˈnɔvɔ] is a village in the administrative district of Gmina Suwałki, within Suwałki County, Podlaskie Voivodeship, in north-eastern Poland.
