= Bobrowisko =

- Village
- Location within Poland
- Coordinates: 54°11′N 23°7′E
- Country: Poland
- Voivodeship: Podlaskie
- County: Suwałki
- Gmina: Suwałki
- Website: http://www.bobrowisko.pl/

Bobrowisko [bɔbrɔˈviskɔ] is a village in the administrative district of Gmina Suwałki, within Suwałki County, Podlaskie Voivodeship, in north-eastern Poland.
