= Wychodne =

- Village
- Location within Poland
- Coordinates: 54°4′N 22°50′E
- Country: Poland
- Voivodeship: Podlaskie
- County: Suwałki
- Gmina: Suwałki
- Time zone: UTC+1 (CET)
  - Summer (DST): UTC+2 (CEST)
- Vehicle registration: BSU

Wychodne [vɨˈxɔdnɛ] is a village in the administrative district of Gmina Suwałki, within Suwałki County, Podlaskie Voivodeship, in north-eastern Poland.

== History ==
As of 1827, the village had a population of 168.

Following the German-Soviet invasion of Poland, which started World War II in September 1939, was occupied by Germany until 1944. On 18 March 1944, Polish partisans of the Home Army attacked a German military post in the village.
