= Szpilman Award =

Visual arts award

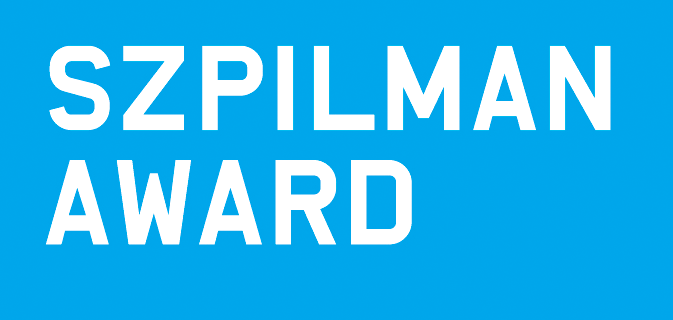
The logo of Szpilman Award.

The Szpilman Award is an annual art prize. It is awarded to works that exist only for a moment or a short period of time. The purpose of the award is to promote such works whose forms consist of ephemeral situations. It was first presented in 2003 and is still the only award for ephemeral works worldwide. The prize is open for the public.

== Background ==
The Szpilman Award is initiated, financed and organized by German-based art group Szpilman. It was founded in 2003. Initially only people from Germany could apply. Regulations were changed in 2004 and opened the call for Europe. The public interest in the prize raised. In 2006 Szpilman abolished any restrictions: everyone from all over the world can apply now for the Szpilman Award. The winner is chosen by a panel of up to 10 independent judges including the winner of the previous year. The prize is accompanied with a dynamic cash award (sum of money collected by members of the jury parallel to the competition, called "Jackpot Stipendium"), a trip to Cimochowizna (Poland), and a challenge cup which will be handed over to the next prize winner in the subsequent year.

Since 2008 the Szpilman Award is also running a daily bulletin about ephemeral works, called "Potz!Blitz!Szpilman!".

To make ephemeral works more public and to show a greater variety of possibilities members of Szpilman Award curate exhibitions since 2006 in cities all around the world, called Szpilman Award Shows, e.g. in galleries, museums and public spaces in Austria, Germany, Greenland, Israel, Italy, Switzerland, The Netherlands and Turkey.

== Winners and shortlisted artists ==
Year	Winner	Work	Shortlisted	Notes
2003	Julia Weidner (Germany)	'Keep on'	Shannon Bool; David Borchers; Karin Felbermayr; Stefan Hurtig; Alice Musiol; Gudrun Schuster	
2004	Catrin Bolt (Austria)	'Ausstellung in der galerie.kärnten'	Shannon Bool; David Borchers & Gregor Schubert; Matthias Lehmann; Alice Musiol; Gloria Zein	
2005	Albert Heta (Kosovo)	'Embassy of the Republic of Kosova, Prague, Czech Republic'	Wolfgang Breuer; C5; Sarah Ortmeyer; Michael Part; Simone Slee; Adrian Williams	
2006	Martin Flemming (Germany)	'Wenn jeder denkt, es ist für alle, dann füttert niemand die Fische'	Oleg Buryan; Pol Matthé; Stefanie Trojan	
2007	Doug Fishbone (United Kingdom) Michał Sznajder (Poland)	'Untitled (Muslim in Cage in Freud Museum)' 'Here'	Evangelia Basdekis; Anja Brendle & Sebastian Höhmann; MeMe; Marc Nothelfer; Poison Idea	
2008	Kamila Szejnoch (Poland)	'Swing'	Giorgina Choueiri; Julia Dick; Sai Hua Kuan; Kate Mitchell; Chris Richmond	
2009	Hank Schmidt in der Beek (Germany)	'In den Zillertaler Alpen'	Jennyfer Haddad; Gerard Herman; Jaroslav Kyša; Roy Menahem Markovich; Alexander Thieme	
2010	Sara Nuytemans & Arya Pandjalu (The Netherlands & Indonesia)	'Treebute from Yogya'	Anna Gohmert; Jennyfer Haddad; Maria Victoria Muñoz Castillo; Berndnaut Smilde; Tomas Werner	
2011	Jaroslav Kyša (United Kingdom)	'The Barrier'	Jaś Domicz; David Horvitz; Petr Krátký; Jinho Lim; Péter Szabó	
2012	Miná Minov (Bulgaria)	'Bribe a Jury'	Kush Badhwar; Alex Jones; Max Schranner; Amanda Wachob	
2013	Luuk Schröder	'Untitled'	Vojtěch Fröhlich, Ondřej Mladý, Jan Šimánek and Vladimír Turner; Ilisie Remus; Marwin Rüffer; RoByn Thompson; Dominic Watson	
2014	Paweł Stasiewicz	'1,2,3,4'	Robert Mădălin Demeter, Alexis Dworsky & Joachim Kaiser; Dávid Gutema & Dávid Mikulán; Lodewijk Heylen; Maciej Szczęśniak	

== Jury ==
- Bernd Euler (Germany)
- Lise Harlev (Denmark)
- Anna Henckel-Donnersmarck (Germany)
- Leonard Kahlcke (United Kingdom)
- Patrick Koch (Germany)
- Tina Kohlmann (Greenland)
- Claus Richter (Germany)
- Tina Schott (Belgium)
- Michał Sznajder (Poland)
- prize winner of the previous year

== See also ==
- List of European art awards
