= Huta, Gmina Suwałki =

Huta
- Settlement
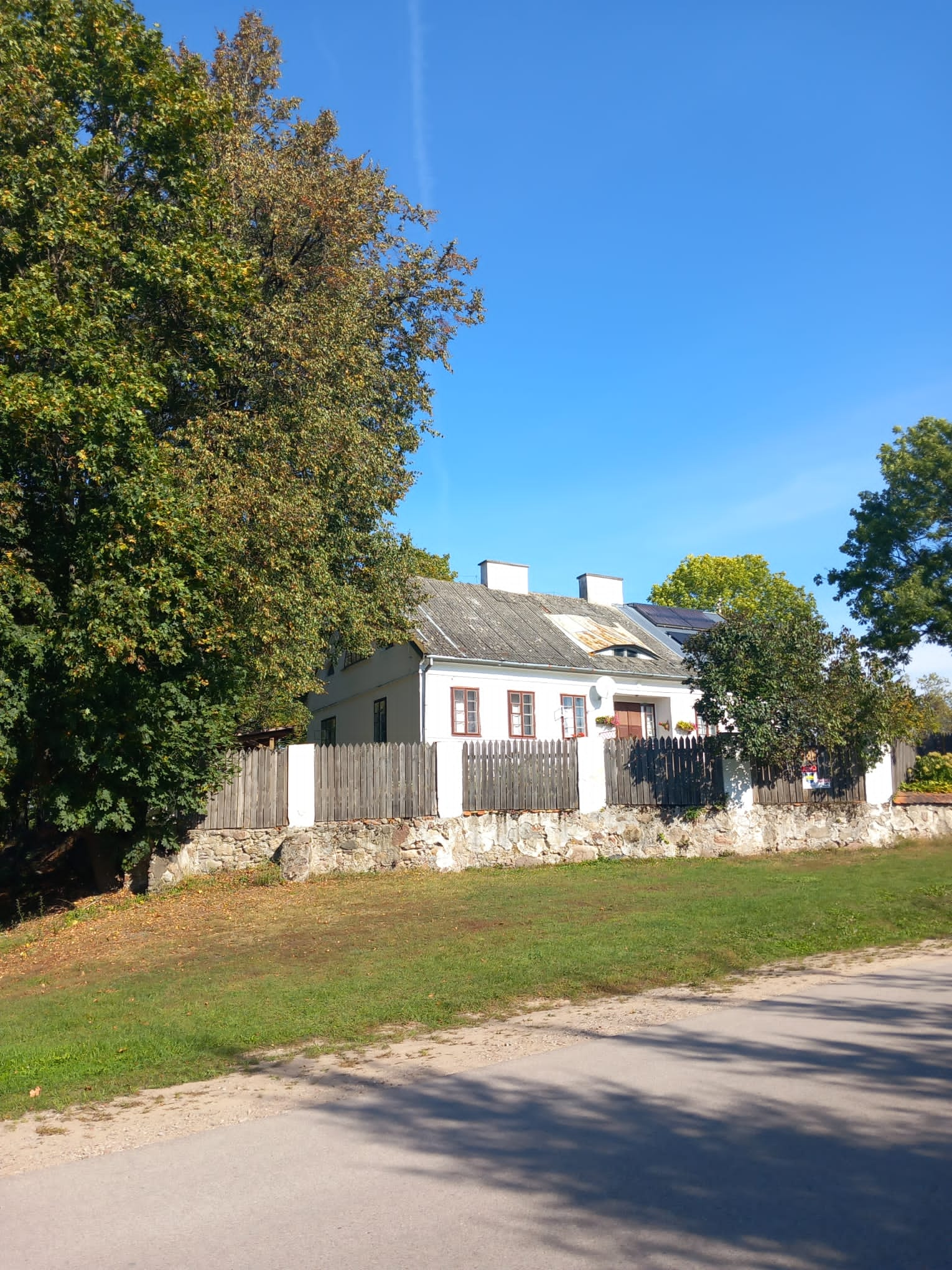

- Location within Poland
- Coordinates: 54°6′13″N 23°1′30″E
- Country: Poland
- Voivodeship: Podlaskie
- County: Suwałki
- Gmina: Suwałki

Huta [ˈxuta] is a settlement in the administrative district of Gmina Suwałki, within Suwałki County, Podlaskie Voivodeship, in north-eastern Poland.
