= Korkliny =

- Village
- Location within Poland
- Coordinates: 54°6′N 22°48′E
- Country: Poland
- Voivodeship: Podlaskie
- County: Suwałki
- Gmina: Suwałki
- Population: 100

Korkliny [kɔrˈklinɨ] is a village in the administrative district of Gmina Suwałki, within Suwałki County, Podlaskie Voivodeship, in north-eastern Poland.
