= Tartak, Suwałki County =

Tartak
- Village
- Location within Poland
- Coordinates: 54°6′N 23°6′E
- Country: Poland
- Voivodeship: Podlaskie
- County: Suwałki
- Gmina: Suwałki

Tartak [ˈtartak] is a village in the administrative district of Gmina Suwałki, within Suwałki County, Podlaskie Voivodeship, in north-eastern Poland.
