= Płociczno-Osiedle =

- Village
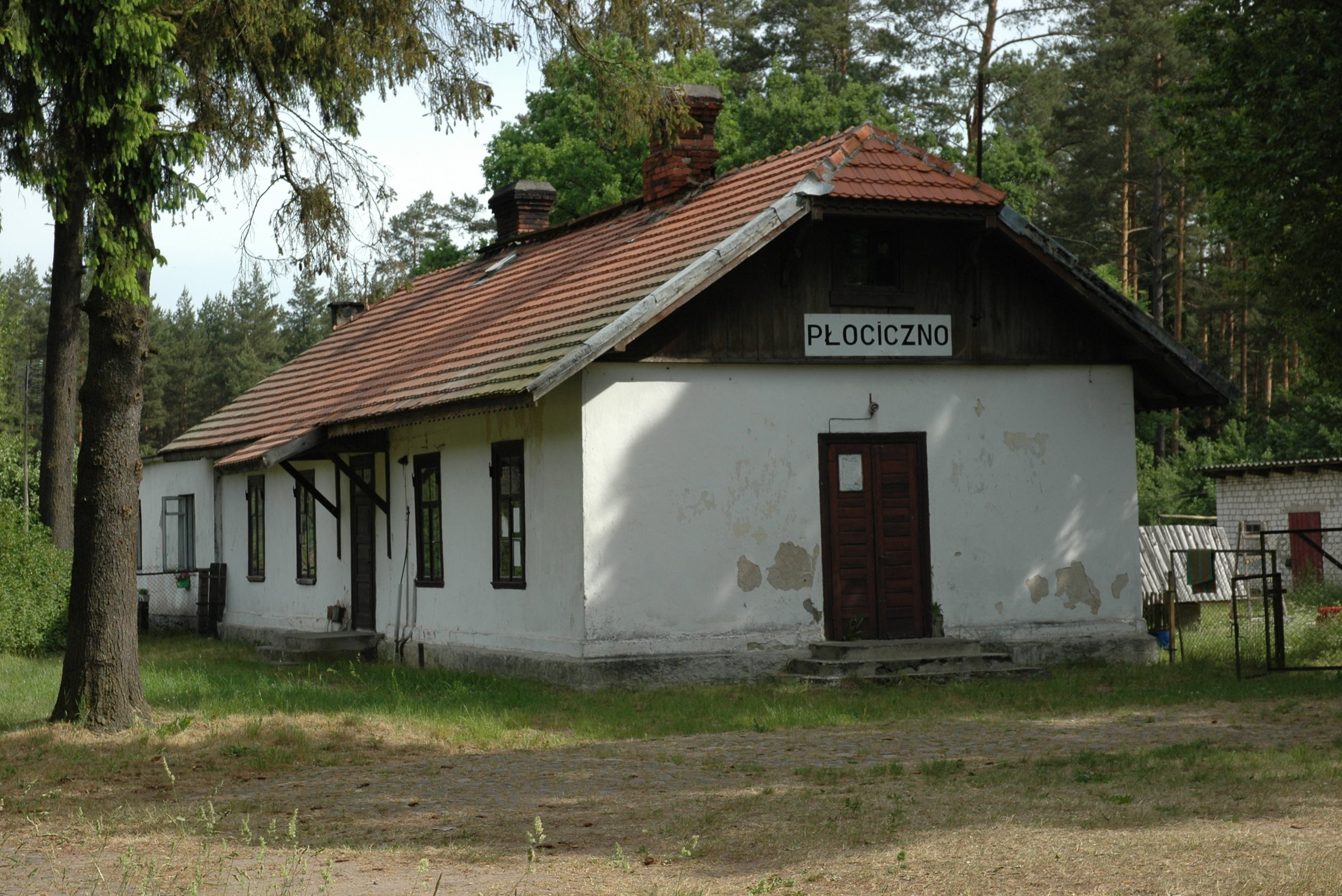

- Location within Poland
- Coordinates: 54°2′3″N 22°57′45″E
- Country: Poland
- Voivodeship: Podlaskie
- County: Suwałki
- Gmina: Suwałki
- Population: 500

Płociczno-Osiedle [pwɔˈt͡ɕit͡ʂnɔ ɔˈɕɛdlɛ] is a village in the administrative district of Gmina Suwałki, within Suwałki County, Podlaskie Voivodeship, in north-eastern Poland.
