= Kuków, Podlaskie Voivodeship =

Village in Poland

Kuków
- Village
- Location within Poland
- Coordinates: 54°6′N 22°51′E
- Country: Poland
- Voivodeship: Podlaskie
- County: Suwałki
- Gmina: Suwałki

Kuków [ˈkukuf] is a village in the administrative district of Gmina Suwałki, within Suwałki County, Podlaskie Voivodeship, in north-eastern Poland.
