= Przebród =

- Village
- Location within Poland
- Coordinates: 54°5′N 22°49′E
- Country: Poland
- Voivodeship: Podlaskie
- County: Suwałki
- Gmina: Suwałki
- Postal code: 16-402
- Vehicle registration: BSU

Przebród [ˈpʂɛbrut] is a village in the administrative district of Gmina Suwałki, within Suwałki County, Podlaskie Voivodeship, in north-eastern Poland.

Four Polish citizens were murdered by Nazi Germany in the village during World War II.
