= Zielone Królewskie =

- Village
- Location within Poland
- Coordinates: 54°4′5″N 22°51′50″E
- Country: Poland
- Voivodeship: Podlaskie
- County: Suwałki
- Gmina: Suwałki

Zielone Królewskie (Polish pronunciation: [ʑɛˈlɔnɛ kruˈlɛfskʲɛ]) is a village in the administrative district of Gmina Suwałki, within Suwałki County, Podlaskie Voivodeship, in north-eastern Poland.
