= Poddubówek =

- Village
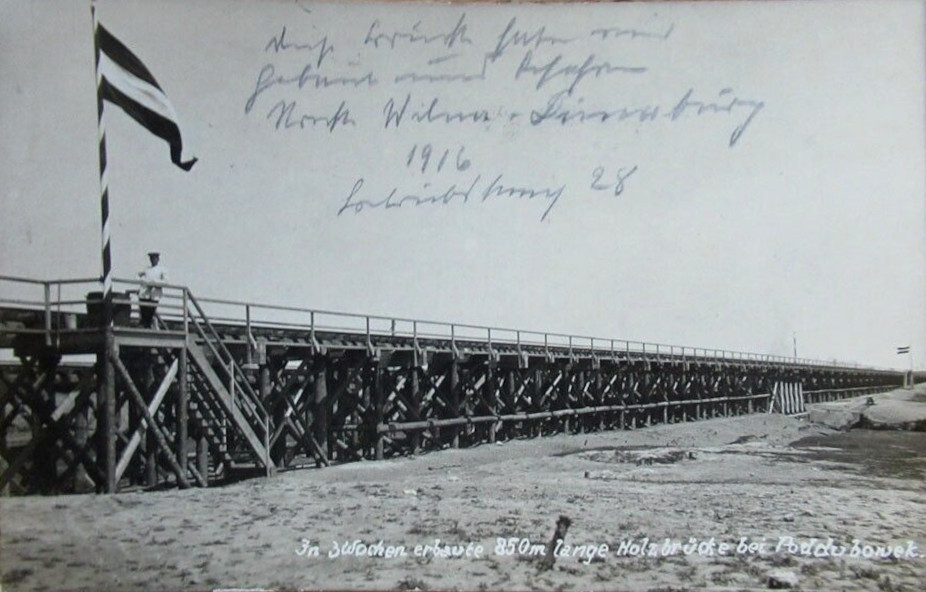
- 850 metre long wooden bridge near Poddubówek built in 3 weeks during WWI

- Location within Poland
- Coordinates: 54°2′19″N 22°52′38″E
- Country: Poland
- Voivodeship: Podlaskie
- County: Suwałki
- Gmina: Suwałki

Poddubówek [pɔdduˈbuvɛk] is a village in the administrative district of Gmina Suwałki, within Suwałki County, Podlaskie Voivodeship, in north-eastern Poland.

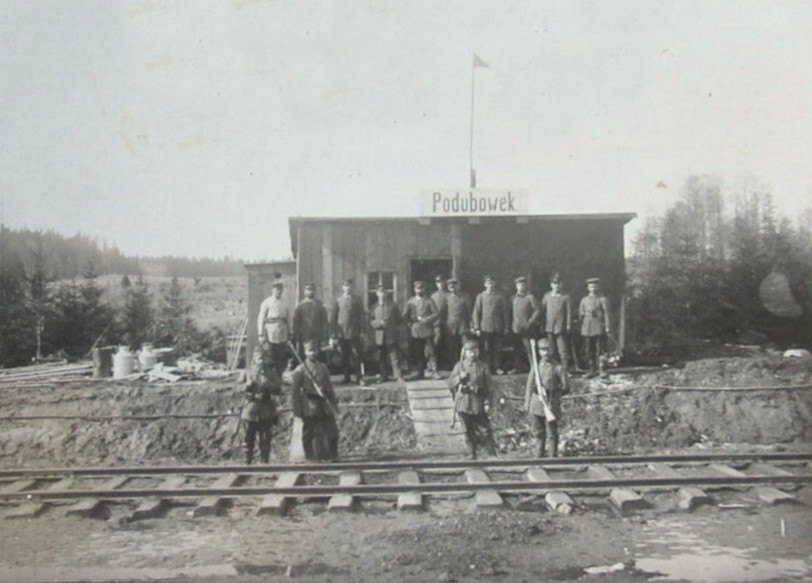
Make-shift station of a German military railway during WWI
