= Osinki, Suwałki County =

Osinki
- Village
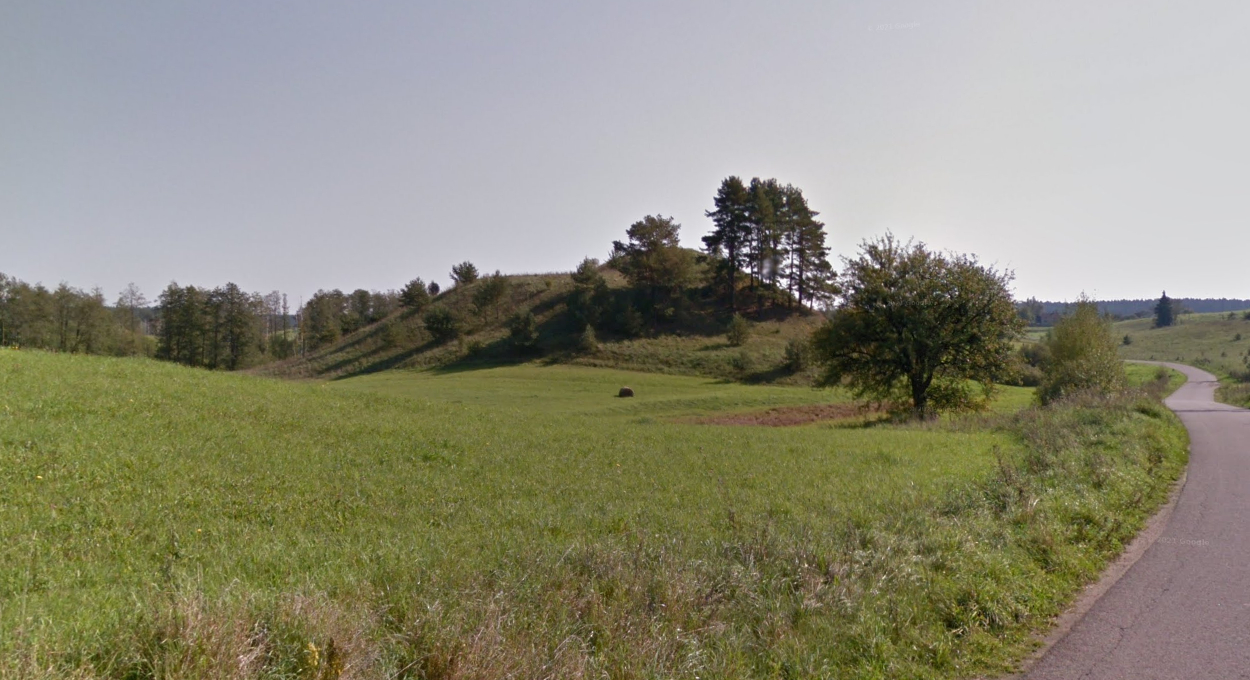

- Location within Poland
- Coordinates: 54°7′N 22°59′E
- Country: Poland
- Voivodeship: Podlaskie
- County: Suwałki
- Gmina: Suwałki

Osinki [ɔˈɕiŋki] is a village in the administrative district of Gmina Suwałki, within Suwałki County, Podlaskie Voivodeship, in north-eastern Poland.
