= Wiatrołuża Pierwsza =

- Village
- Location within Poland
- Coordinates: 54°9′21″N 23°5′18″E
- Country: Poland
- Voivodeship: Podlaskie
- County: Suwałki
- Gmina: Suwałki

Wiatrołuża Pierwsza [vjatrɔˈwuʐa ˈpjɛrfʂa] is a village in the administrative district of Gmina Suwałki, within Suwałki County, Podlaskie Voivodeship, in north-eastern Poland.
