= Kuków-Folwark =

Village in Gmina Suwałki, Poland

- Village
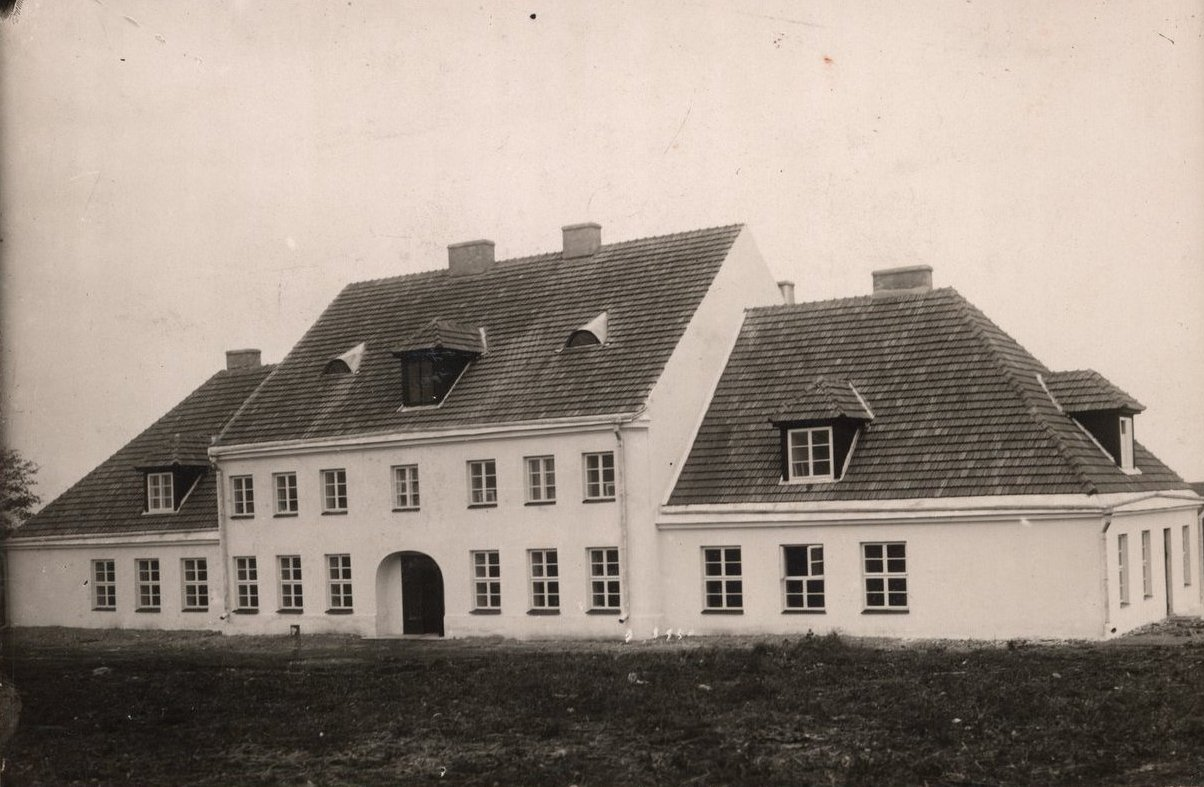

- Location within Poland
- Coordinates: 54°07′32″N 22°49′43″E
- Country: Poland
- Voivodeship: Podlaskie
- County: Suwałki
- Gmina: Suwałki

Kuków-Folwark [ˈkukuf ˈfɔlvark] is a village in the administrative district of Gmina Suwałki, within Suwałki County, Podlaskie Voivodeship, in north-eastern Poland.
