= EV4 The Central Europe Route =

Long-distance cycling route in Europe

- EuroVelo 4 waymark
- Length: 5,050 km (3,140 mi)
- Location: France, Belgium, Netherlands, Germany, Czech Republic, Poland, Ukraine
- Designation: EuroVelo 4
- Trailheads: Roscoff, France – Kyiv, Ukraine
- Use: Cycling
- Maintainer: European Cyclists' Federation and national or regional partners
- Website: en.eurovelo.com/ev4

Trail map
- Schematic map of EuroVelo 4

EV4 The Central Europe Route, also known as EuroVelo 4 or EV4, is a long-distance cycling route in the EuroVelo network. It runs from Roscoff in Brittany, France, to Kyiv in Ukraine, crossing France, Belgium, the Netherlands, Germany, the Czech Republic, Poland and Ukraine. The route is listed by EuroVelo as about 5,050 km (3,140 mi) long, crossing seven countries and passing 21 UNESCO World Heritage Sites.

The route follows a west–east axis across northern and central Europe. It includes coastal sections in Brittany, Normandy, northern France and Flanders, the southern Dutch provinces, the Rhine and Main corridors in Germany, a cross-country route through Czechia, southern Poland and the western and central parts of Ukraine.

== Background and status ==
EuroVelo is a network of long-distance cycle routes coordinated by the European Cyclists' Federation. EuroVelo distinguishes between certified, developed, signed, partially developed, undeveloped and unknown sections. Its complete downloadable GPX route can include developed sections as well as parts still in development or planning, while a separate GPX file is provided for developed sections only.

The level of infrastructure varies considerably along EV4. The French route is presented as a completed coastal route, the Dutch and German sections use established national long-distance cycling routes, and parts of Central and Eastern Europe include sections with more variable signing or route development.

== Route ==
=== France ===
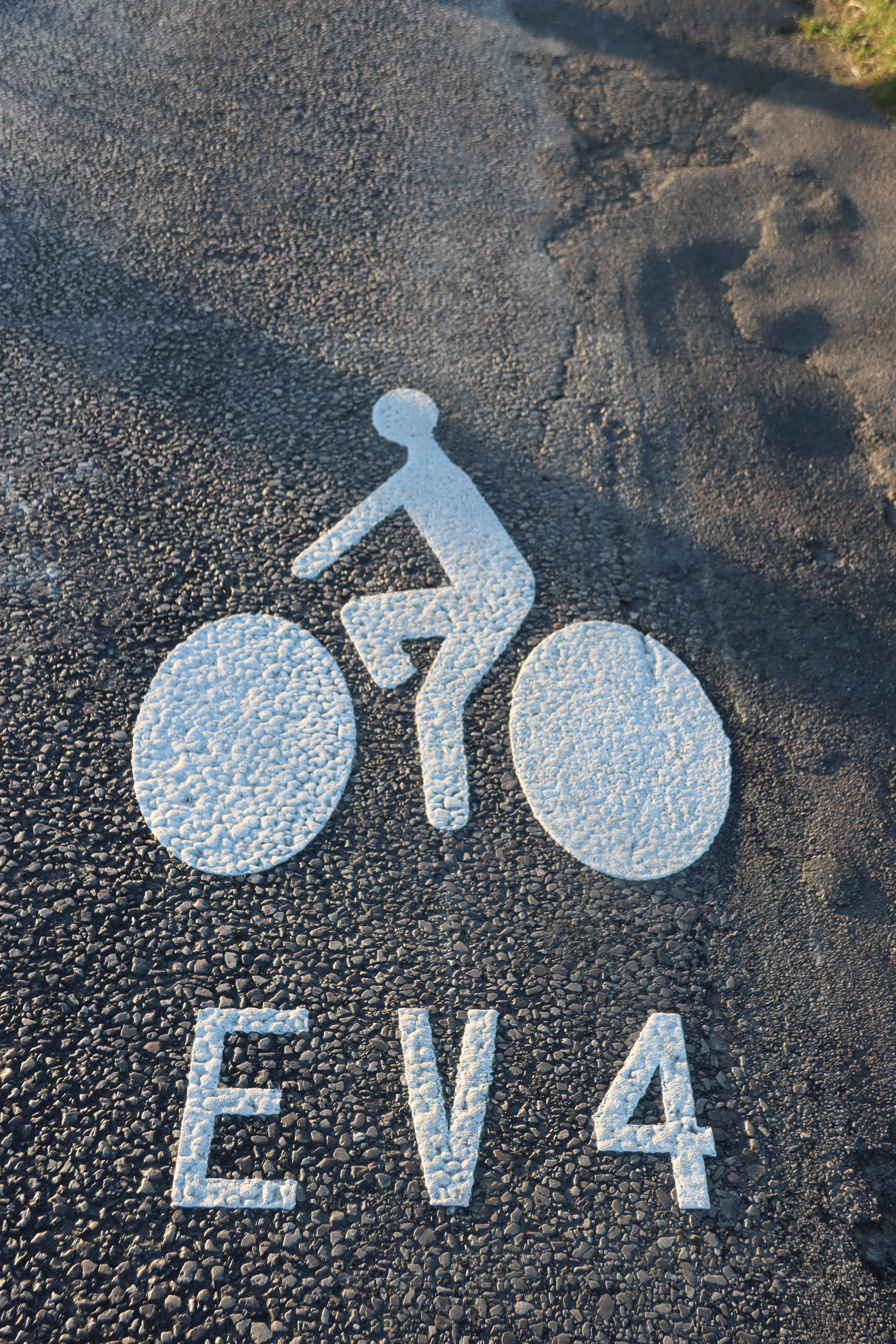
Signing for La Vélomaritime, the French section of EuroVelo 4

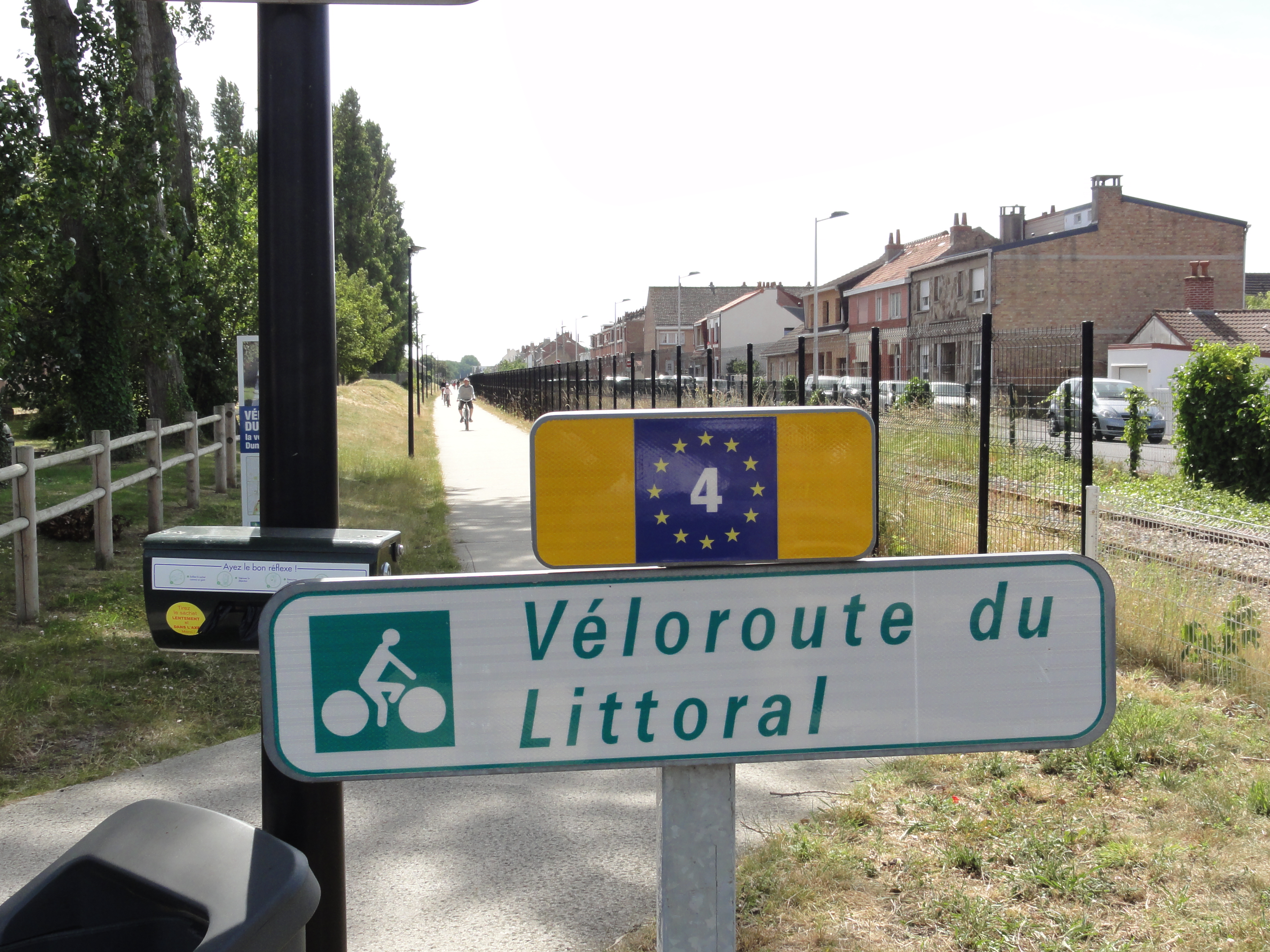
Coastal cycle route in Leffrinckoucke, northern France

In France, EV4 is branded as La Vélomaritime. It runs from Roscoff in Brittany to Dunkirk on the Belgian border, following the Channel and North Sea coastline for nearly 1,500 km (930 mi). The French route crosses Brittany, Normandy and Hauts-de-France, passing or approaching the Pink Granite Coast, Mont-Saint-Michel, the D-Day landing beaches, the cliffs at Étretat, the Bay of Somme and the Opal Coast.

The French section was completed in 2021 and is divided by France Vélo Tourisme into 53 stages. It is fully signposted, with La Vélomaritime and EuroVelo 4 identifiers, although some alignments are described as provisional pending higher-standard infrastructure. France Vélo Tourisme lists 928 km of the French route on shared roads, 609 km on cycleways or dedicated cycle routes, and 82 km on unpaved surfaces.

=== Belgium ===
EV4 crosses Belgium along the Flemish coast, between the French border and the Dutch border. The route passes through or near Nieuwpoort, Ostend and the Zwin nature park at Knokke-Heist. In Flanders, EV4 is associated with the coastal route known as the Kustroute and shares the North Sea coastal corridor with EV12 The North Sea Cycle Route.

The modern Flemish Coastal Route is part of Flanders' network of iconic cycle routes. The regional tourism service describes these iconic routes as signposted in both directions. EuroVelo Pro reported the Coastal Route as a 93 km route connecting to the Dutch Coastal Route and to La Vélomaritime in France.

=== Netherlands ===
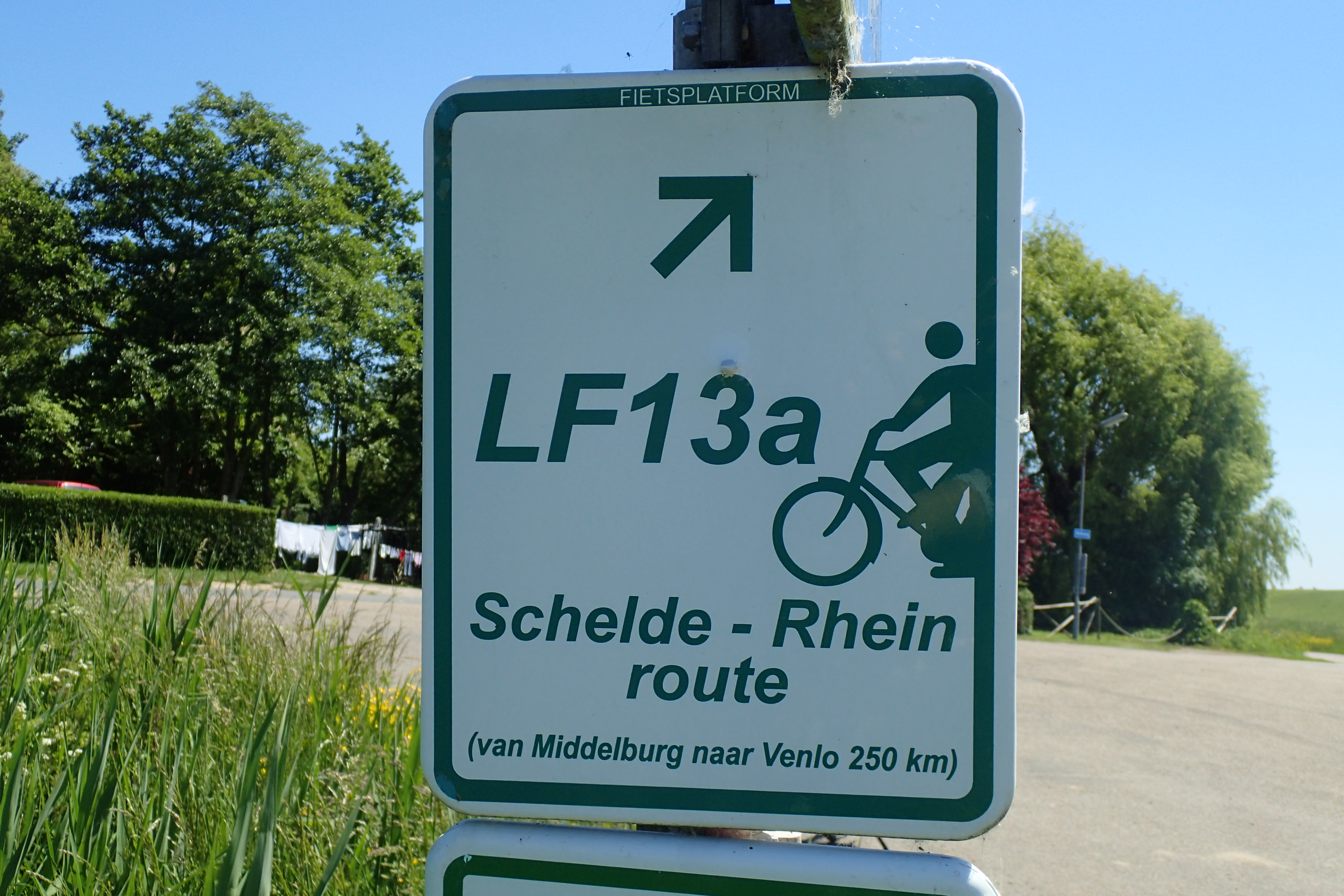
LF13 route signage in the Netherlands

In the Netherlands, EV4 uses the long-distance cycle route LF13 Schelde-Rheinroute between Venlo, on the Dutch-German border, and Vlissingen. From Vlissingen to Sluis, near the Belgian border, it follows LF1. EuroVelo states that cyclists on this section should follow the LF13 signs and that the Dutch section of EV4 is signposted in both directions.

Nederland Fietsland lists LF13 as a 283 km route from Vlissingen to Venlo through the southern provinces of the Netherlands, including Zeeland, North Brabant and Limburg. The EV4 corridor passes near Breda, Eindhoven and Venlo.

=== Germany ===
In Germany, EV4 continues from the Dutch border toward the Rhine and then follows long sections associated with the Rhine Cycle Route and the Main Cycle Route. The German section is presented by EuroVelo as part of Germany's national long-distance cycle network, D-Route 5.

Radnetz Deutschland describes D-Route 5 as following the Saar and Moselle corridors, the Rheinradweg between the mouth of the Moselle and the mouth of the Main, and then the Mainradweg almost to the source of the Main near Bischofsgrün in Bavaria. From there, it uses the Brückenradweg Bavaria-Bohemia toward Czechia. EuroVelo also provides cycling guides for the German Rhine and Main sections, including the section between Mainz and Bayreuth and the section between Bad Berneck and Bischofsgrün.

=== Czech Republic ===
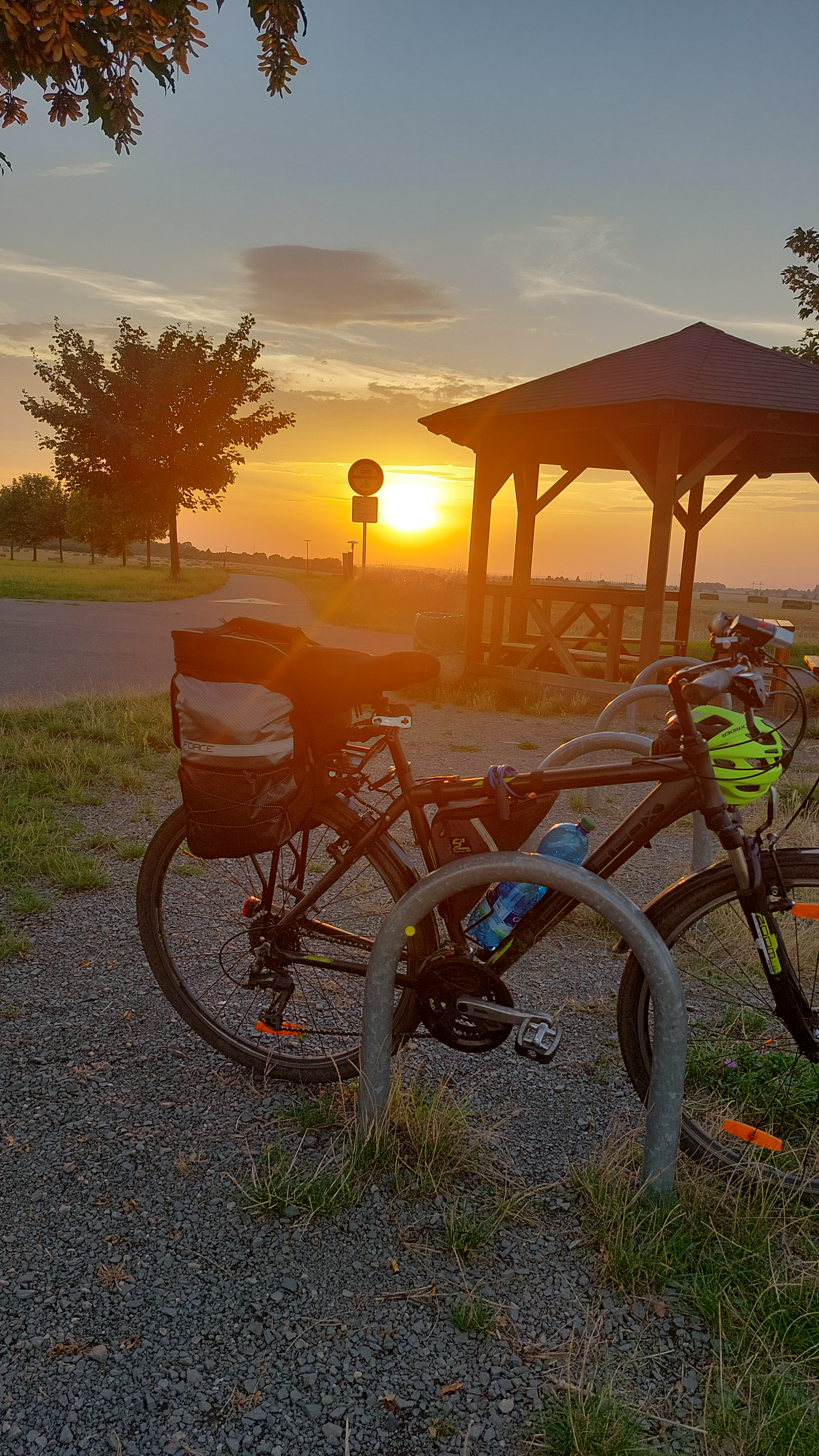
EuroVelo 4 near Prague

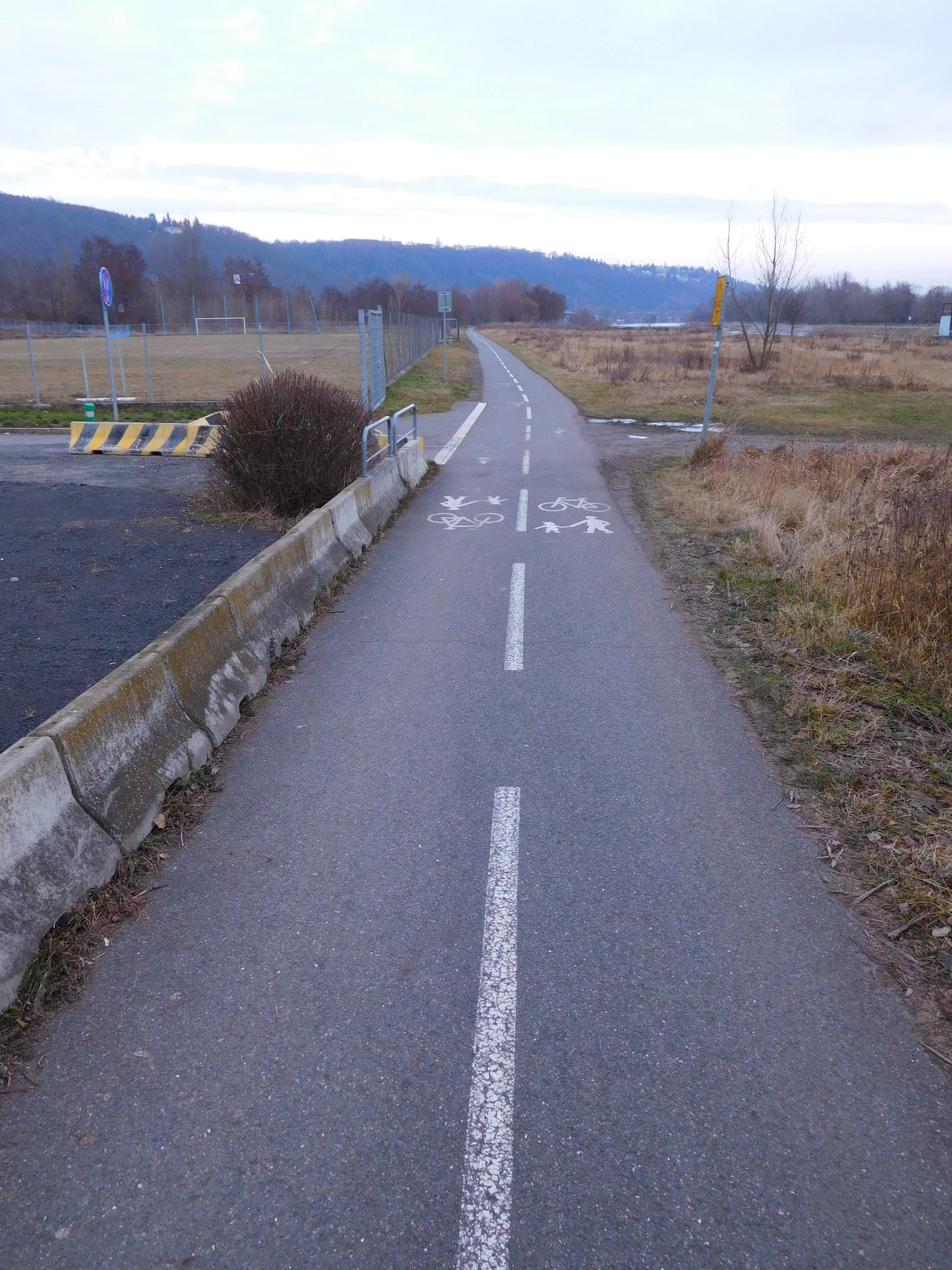
EV4 on cycle route A1 in Prague-Velká Chuchle

In the Czech Republic, EV4 crosses the country from west to east. From the German border it follows the Ohře/Eger River Trail through Cheb and Karlovy Vary. It then continues via the Berounka–Střela Greenway, the Křivoklátsko Protected Landscape Area, Karlštejn Castle and Prague. Farther east, the route passes through central Bohemia, Brno, the area associated with the Battle of Austerlitz, the Morava River Trail and the Ostrava region before reaching the Polish border.

The Czech section is over 900 km long and connects the country's main urban centres on the route, including Prague, Brno and Ostrava. EuroVelo's Czech description also identifies the Elbe basin, the Bohemian-Moravian Highlands and South Moravia as part of the route context.

=== Poland ===
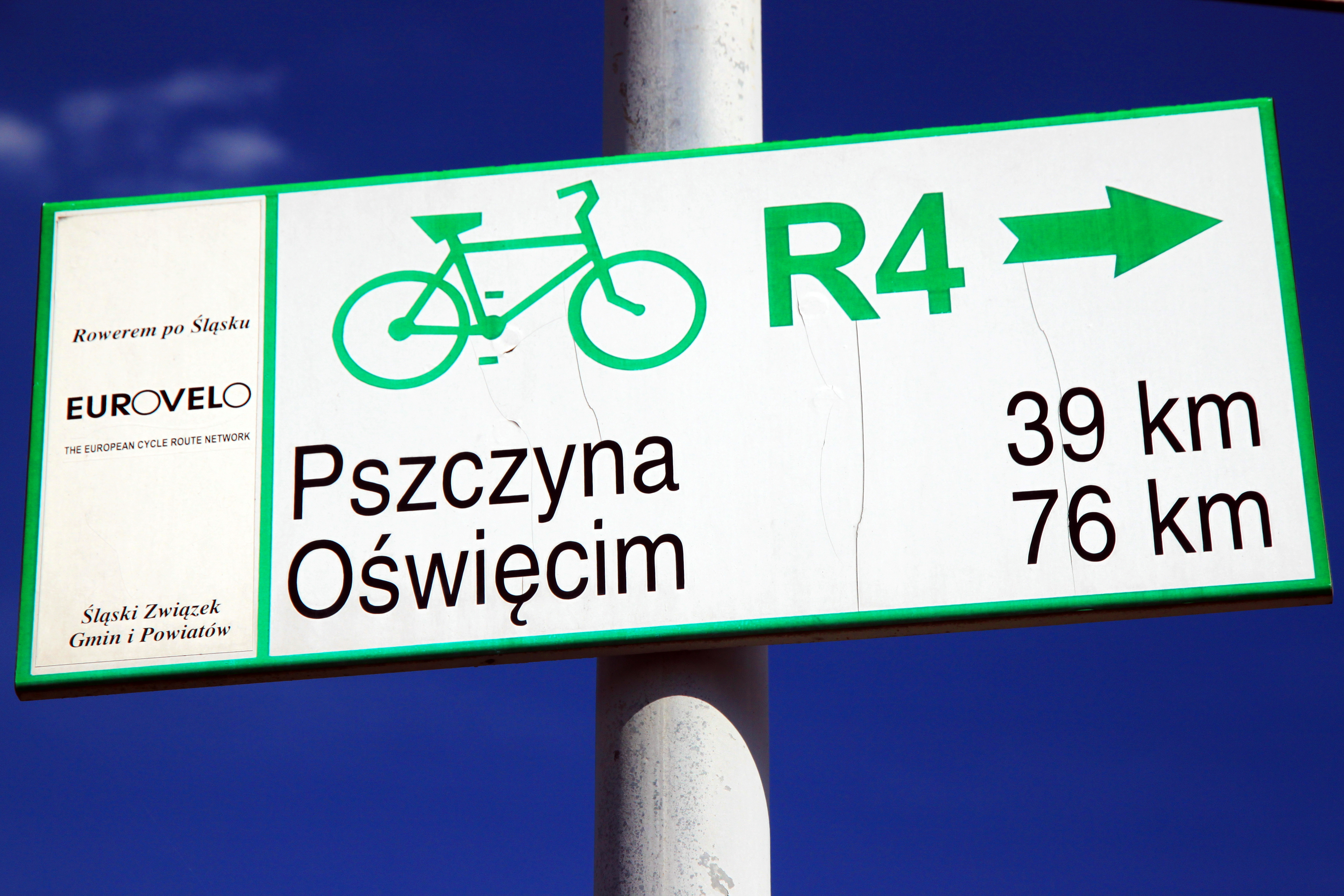
R-4 route boards in Jastrzębie-Zdrój, Poland

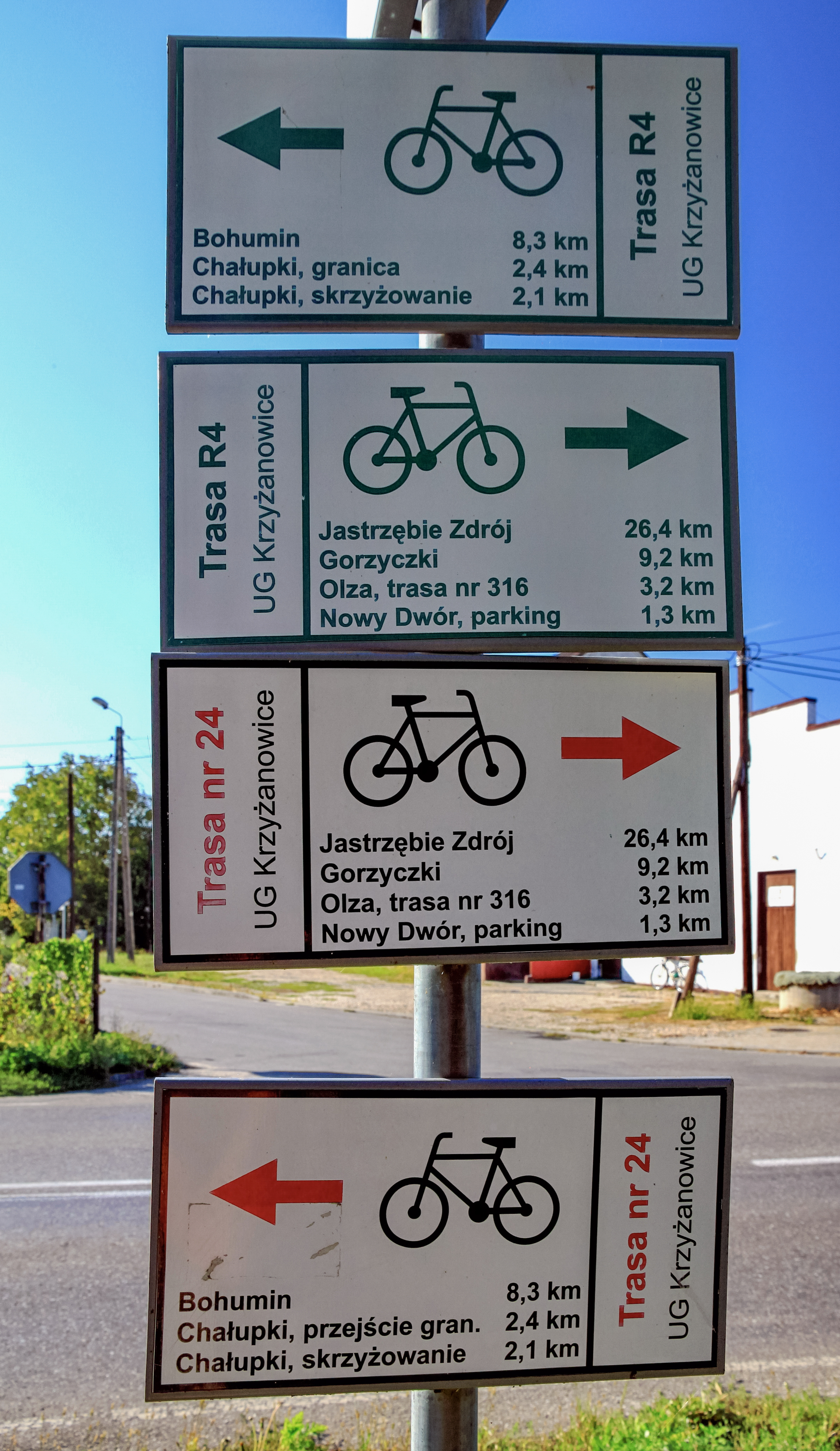
R-4 signs in Zabełków, Silesian Voivodeship

In Poland, EV4 crosses the southern part of the country. EuroVelo identifies Kraków and Rzeszów as key cities on the Polish section. In the Silesian Voivodeship, the route corresponds to the R4 cycle trail from Chałupki near the Czech border through Jastrzębie-Zdrój, Strumień and Pszczyna toward the border with Lesser Poland. A regional route description gives the Silesian section as about 89 km long and notes that it includes public roads, separate cycling infrastructure, gravel roads and short sections on other surfaces.

In the Lesser Poland Voivodeship, EV4 is known as VeloMetropolis. The regional route is approximately 220 km long and links Tarnów, Kraków and Oświęcim through the Tarnów area and the Vistula valley. The official regional portal notes that the route often runs near railway stations and that west of Niepołomice it shares the corridor of the Vistula Cycle Route toward the Silesian border.

=== Ukraine ===
EV4 in Ukraine runs from the Polish-Ukrainian border to Kyiv. The official EuroVelo description names Lviv and Zhytomyr among the cities on the route and describes the section as passing through western and central Ukraine. EuroVelo's German-language country page notes that the Ukrainian section is not yet fully developed.

== Infrastructure and services ==
The cycle route combines dedicated cycleways, greenways, shared low-traffic roads and, in some countries, sections that are still under development. The best-documented national sections are the French, Dutch, German, Czech and Lesser Poland parts, where route pages provide maps, GPX tracks or regional planning information.

Cyclist-friendly service systems differ by country. In France, the national Accueil Vélo label identifies accommodation, bicycle hire and repair services, restaurants, tourist offices and visitor sites adapted to cyclists. In the Netherlands, Fietsers Welkom! identifies cyclist-friendly hotels, campsites, restaurants and cafés offering facilities such as basic repair kits, e-bike charging, water bottle refills, cycle maps and first-aid kits. In Germany, the Bett+Bike scheme lists around 5,900 bicycle-friendly hotels, guesthouses, hostels, campsites and holiday rentals in Germany and Europe. In Czechia, EuroVelo lists interactive maps of cyclist services, including accommodation, campsites, restaurants and tourist attractions, under the Cyclists Welcome / Cyklisté vítáni system. In Lesser Poland, the regional Cyclist-Friendly Places system includes accommodation, catering, tourist attractions, information points, bicycle services and shops.

== Connections with other routes ==
EV4 intersects or shares corridors with several other EuroVelo routes and national long-distance routes. In France, it connects with EV1 The Atlantic Coast Route at Roscoff and with EV5 Via Romea Francigena in the Calais area; between Calais and Bray-Dunes it shares a section with EV12 The North Sea Cycle Route. In Belgium, it follows the North Sea coast corridor used by EV12. In the Netherlands, it uses LF13 Schelde-Rheinroute and LF1. In Germany, it is linked with the Rhine and Main cycle route corridors and with the D-Route network.

In the Czech Republic, EV4 is one of the country's four EuroVelo routes, alongside EV7, EV9 and EV13. In Lesser Poland, VeloMetropolis / EV4 is part of the VeloMałopolska network and connects with the Vistula Cycle Route, VeloDunajec and VeloNatura / EuroVelo 11.

== See also ==
- EuroVelo
- Bicycle touring
- Long-distance cycling route
- EV1 The Atlantic Coast Route
- EV5 Via Romea Francigena
- EV12 The North Sea Cycle Route
- EV15 The Rhine Cycle Route
