= Turówka Nowa =

- Village
- Location within Poland
- Coordinates: 54°08′16″N 22°47′41″E
- Country: Poland
- Voivodeship: Podlaskie
- County: Suwałki
- Gmina: Suwałki

Turówka Nowa [tuˈrufka ˈnɔva] is a village in the administrative district of Gmina Suwałki, within Suwałki County, Podlaskie Voivodeship, in north-eastern Poland.
