= Leszczewo, Gmina Suwałki =

Village in Gmina Suwałki, Poland

Leszczewo
- Village
- Location within Poland
- Coordinates: 54°05′53″N 23°03′59″E
- Country: Poland
- Voivodeship: Podlaskie
- County: Suwałki
- Gmina: Suwałki

Leszczewo [lɛʂˈt͡ʂɛvɔ] is a village in the administrative district of Gmina Suwałki, within Suwałki County, Podlaskie Voivodeship, in north-eastern Poland.
