= Biała Woda, Podlaskie Voivodeship =

Biała Woda
- Village
- Location within Poland
- Coordinates: 54°9′N 22°54′E
- Country: Poland
- Voivodeship: Podlaskie
- County: Suwałki
- Gmina: Suwałki
- Population: 260

Biała Woda [ˈbʲawa ˈvɔda] is a village in the administrative district of Gmina Suwałki, within Suwałki County, Podlaskie Voivodeship, in north-eastern Poland.
