= Korobiec =

- Village
- Location within Poland
- Coordinates: 54°8′N 22°47′E
- Country: Poland
- Voivodeship: Podlaskie
- County: Suwałki
- Gmina: Suwałki

Korobiec [kɔˈrɔbjɛt͡s] is a village in the administrative district of Gmina Suwałki, within Suwałki County, Podlaskie Voivodeship, in north-eastern Poland.
