= Osowa, Podlaskie Voivodeship =

Osowa
- Village
- Location within Poland
- Coordinates: 54°8′N 22°50′E
- Country: Poland
- Voivodeship: Podlaskie
- County: Suwałki
- Gmina: Suwałki

Osowa [ɔˈsɔva] is a village in the administrative district of Gmina Suwałki, within Suwałki County, Podlaskie Voivodeship, in north-eastern Poland.
