= Mała Huta, Podlaskie Voivodeship =

Mała Huta
- Village
- Location within Poland
- Coordinates: 54°6′1″N 22°59′19″E
- Country: Poland
- Voivodeship: Podlaskie
- County: Suwałki
- Gmina: Suwałki
- Population (approx.): 210

Mała Huta [ˈmawa ˈxuta] is a village in the administrative district of Gmina Suwałki, within Suwałki County, Podlaskie Voivodeship, in north-eastern Poland.
