= Bród Nowy =

Village in Gmina Suwałki, Poland

- Village
- Location within Poland
- Coordinates: 54°08′09″N 22°52′25″E
- Country: Poland
- Voivodeship: Podlaskie
- County: Suwałki
- Gmina: Suwałki

Bród Nowy [ˈbrut ˈnɔvɨ] is a village in the administrative district of Gmina Suwałki, within Suwałki County, Podlaskie Voivodeship, in north-eastern Poland.
