= Czerwony Folwark =

- Village
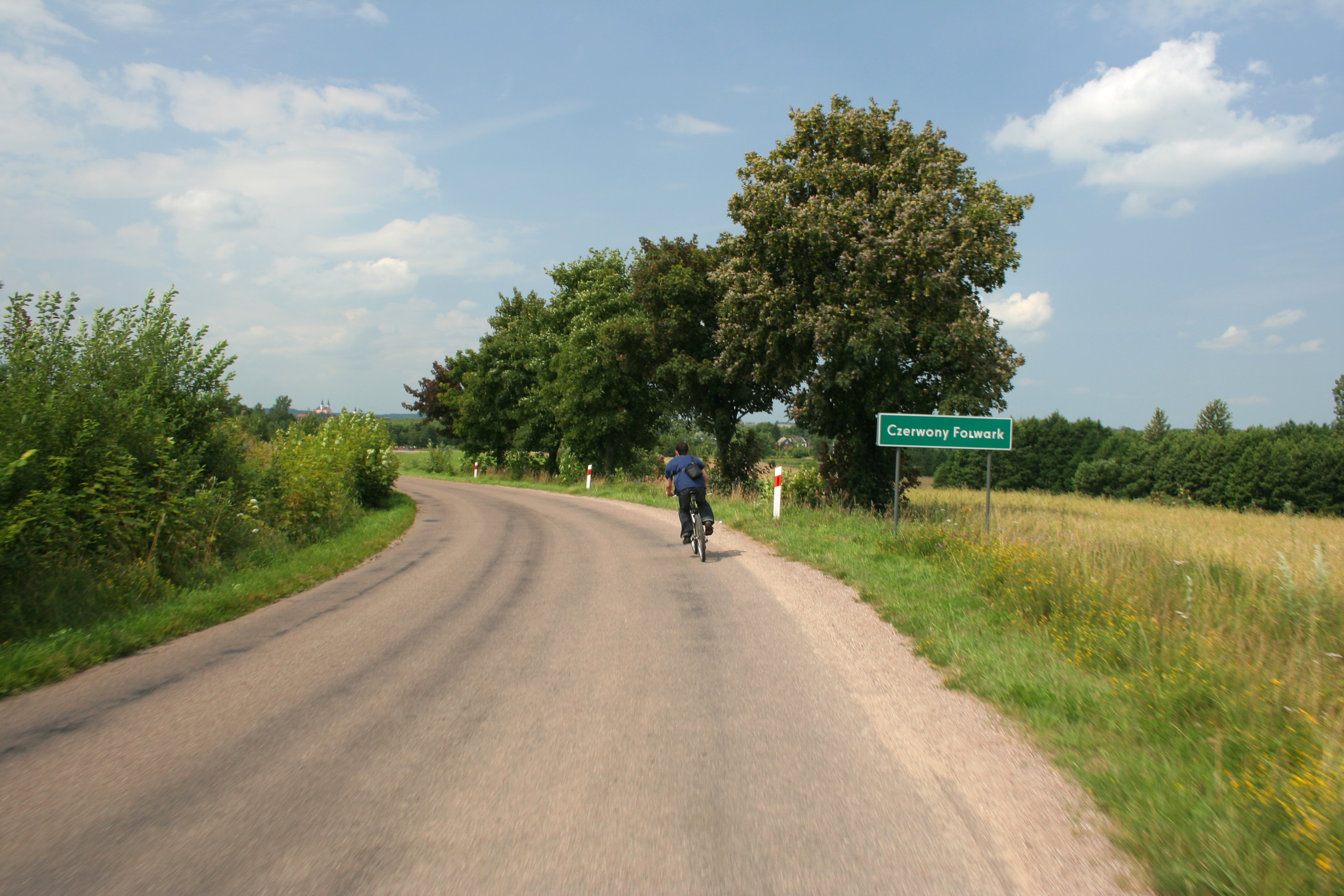

- Location within Poland
- Coordinates: 54°04′04″N 23°06′25″E
- Country: Poland
- Voivodeship: Podlaskie
- County: Suwałki
- Gmina: Suwałki

Czerwony Folwark [t͡ʂɛrˈvɔnɨ ˈfɔlvark] is a village in the administrative district of Gmina Suwałki, within Suwałki County, Podlaskie Voivodeship, in north-eastern Poland.
