= Wigry, Suwałki County =

Wigry
- Village
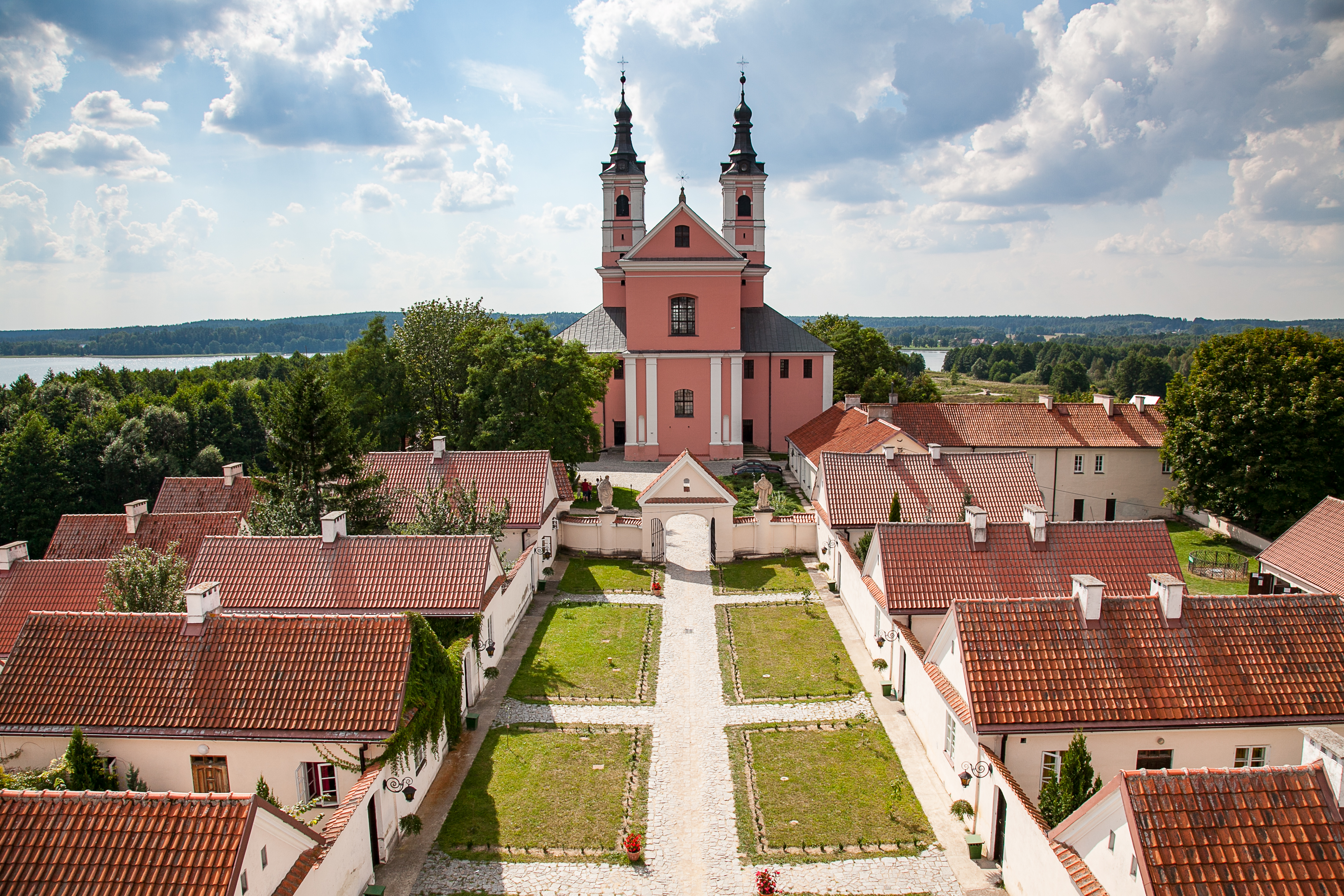
- Church of the Immaculate Conception and monastery

- Location within Poland
- Coordinates: 54°4′N 23°5′E
- Country: Poland
- Voivodeship: Podlaskie
- County: Suwałki
- Gmina: Suwałki

Population
  - Total: 30
- Time zone: UTC+1 (CET)
  - Summer (DST): UTC+2 (CEST)
- Vehicle registration: BSU

Wigry ([ˈviɡrɨ]) is a small village in the administrative district of Gmina Suwałki, within Suwałki County, Podlaskie Voivodeship, in north-eastern Poland.

The local landmark is the Baroque monastery with the Immaculate Conception church.

== Ecclesiastical history ==
The Diocese of Wigry was established on 25 March 1798 on territories split off from the then dioceses of Samogitia (now Metropolitan Archdiocese of Kaunas) and Vilnius (now also Metropolitan Archdiocese) and former Luck (merged).

It was suppressed on 30 June 1818, after only two incumbents, its territory being reassigned to establish the Diocese of Sejny, to which its last incumbent was appointed.

=== Titular see ===
It was nominally restored in October 2014 as a Latin Catholic titular bishopric.

So far it has had a single incumbent, of the lowest (episcopal) rank :

- Marek Szkudło (since 2014.12.13), Auxiliary Bishop of Katowice (Poland)

== See also ==
- List of Catholic dioceses in Poland
