= Żyliny =

- Village
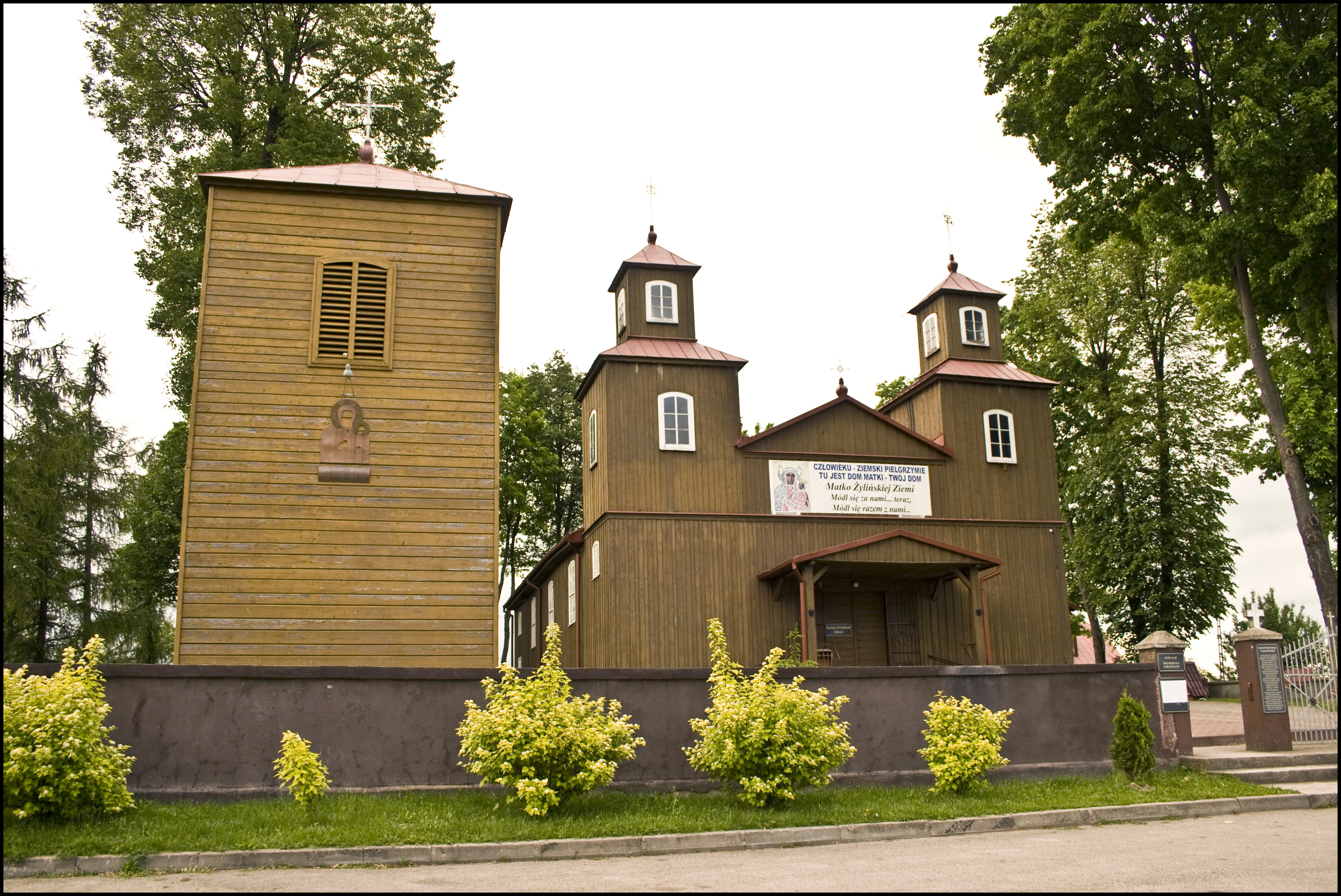
- Church in Żyliny

- Location within Poland
- Coordinates: 54°4′N 22°47′E
- Country: Poland
- Voivodeship: Podlaskie
- County: Suwałki
- Gmina: Suwałki

Żyliny [ʐɨˈlinɨ] is a village in the administrative district of Gmina Suwałki, within Suwałki County, Podlaskie Voivodeship, in north-eastern Poland.
