= Poplin (disambiguation) =

Poplin is a type of fabric.

Poplin may also refer to:

- Poplin, Missouri, a ghost town in the United States
- Poplin, Poland, a village in Poland
- Poplin (company), a company that allows people to hire independent contractors to wash, dry, fold, and deliver laundry
- Poplin, a race of flower creatures in Super Mario Bros. Wonder
