= Kłajpeda =

Kłajpeda, a Polish toponymic derived from the Lithuanian Klaipėda, may refer to:

- Klaipėda, a port city in Lithuania
- Kłajpedka, a village in Poland
- Kłajpeda, Podlaskie Voivodeship, another village in Poland

== See also ==
- Klaipėda (disambiguation)
