= Klaipėda (disambiguation) =

Klaipėda is a city in Lithuania.

Klaipėda may also refer to:

== Places ==
- Klaipėda County, Lithuania
- Klaipėda District Municipality, Lithuania
- Neighborhoods of Klaipėda, Lithuania
- Klaipėda Region, a former area of East Prussia

== Sports ==
- BC Maistas Klaipėda
- Klaipėda Central Stadium
- FC Klaipėda

== Other uses ==
- Klaipėda Airfield
- Klaipėda Castle
- Klaipėda LNG terminal, a liquefied natural gas terminal in Lithuania
- Klaipėda Revolt, a 1923 push for unification of Lithuania with East Prussia
- Klaipėda University
- Coat of arms of Klaipėda
- Port of Klaipėda
- Roman Catholic Territorial Prelature of Klaipėda

== See also ==
- Granitas Klaipėda (disambiguation)
- Kłajpeda (disambiguation)
