= Mauda, Poland =

Mauda
- Village
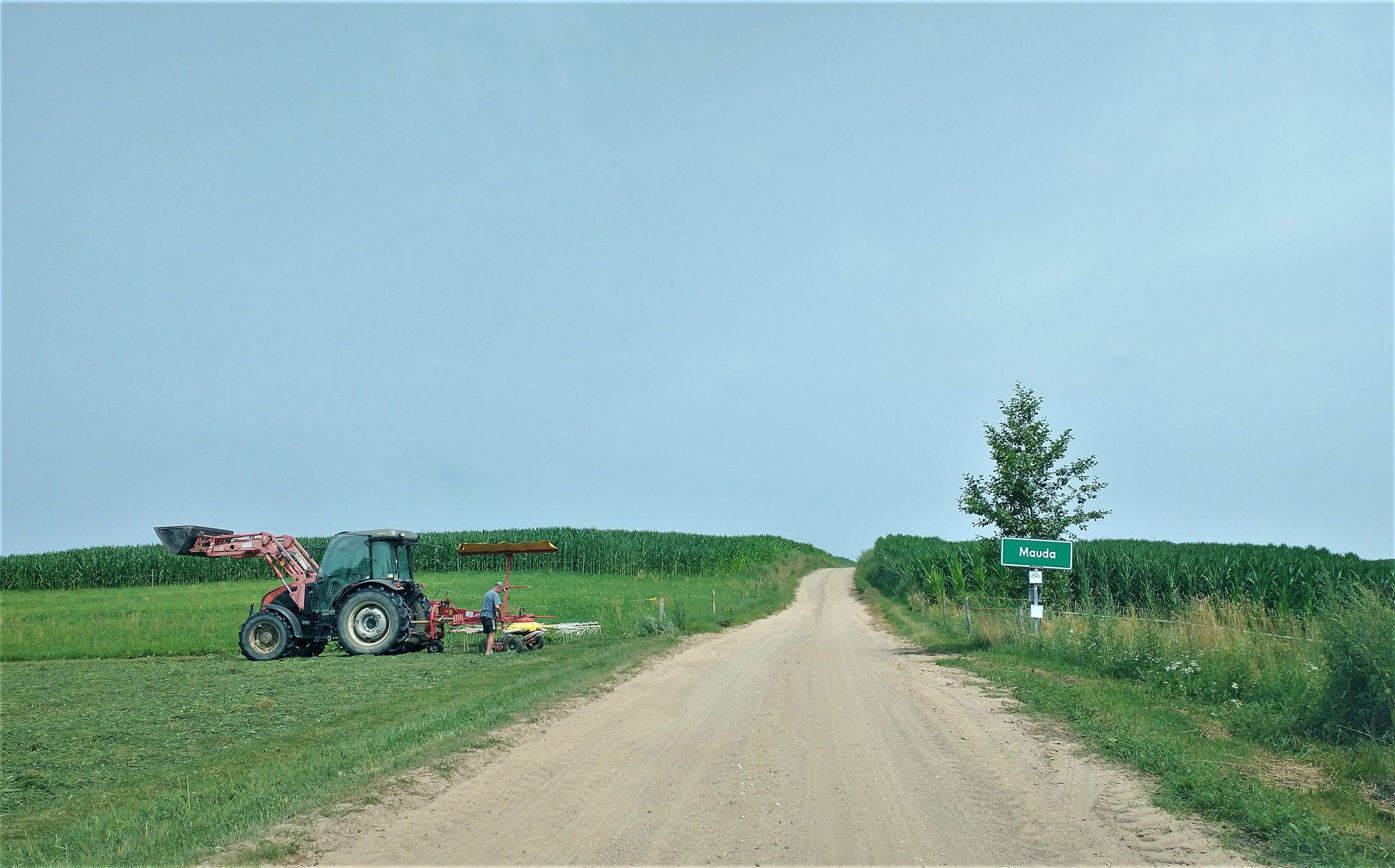

- Location within Poland
- Coordinates: 54°19′42″N 22°48′13″E
- Country: Poland
- Voivodeship: Podlaskie
- County: Suwałki
- Gmina: Wiżajny
- Population: 50

Mauda [ˈmauda] is a village in the administrative district of Gmina Wiżajny, within Suwałki County, Podlaskie Voivodeship, in north-eastern Poland, close to the border with Lithuania.
