= Cisówek, Suwałki County =

Cisówek
- Village
- Location within Poland
- Coordinates: 54°16′21″N 22°50′13″E
- Country: Poland
- Voivodeship: Podlaskie
- County: Suwałki
- Gmina: Wiżajny

Cisówek [t͡ɕiˈsuvɛk] is a village in the administrative district of Gmina Wiżajny, within Suwałki County, Podlaskie Voivodeship, in north-eastern Poland, close to the border with Lithuania.
