= Dzierwany =

- Village
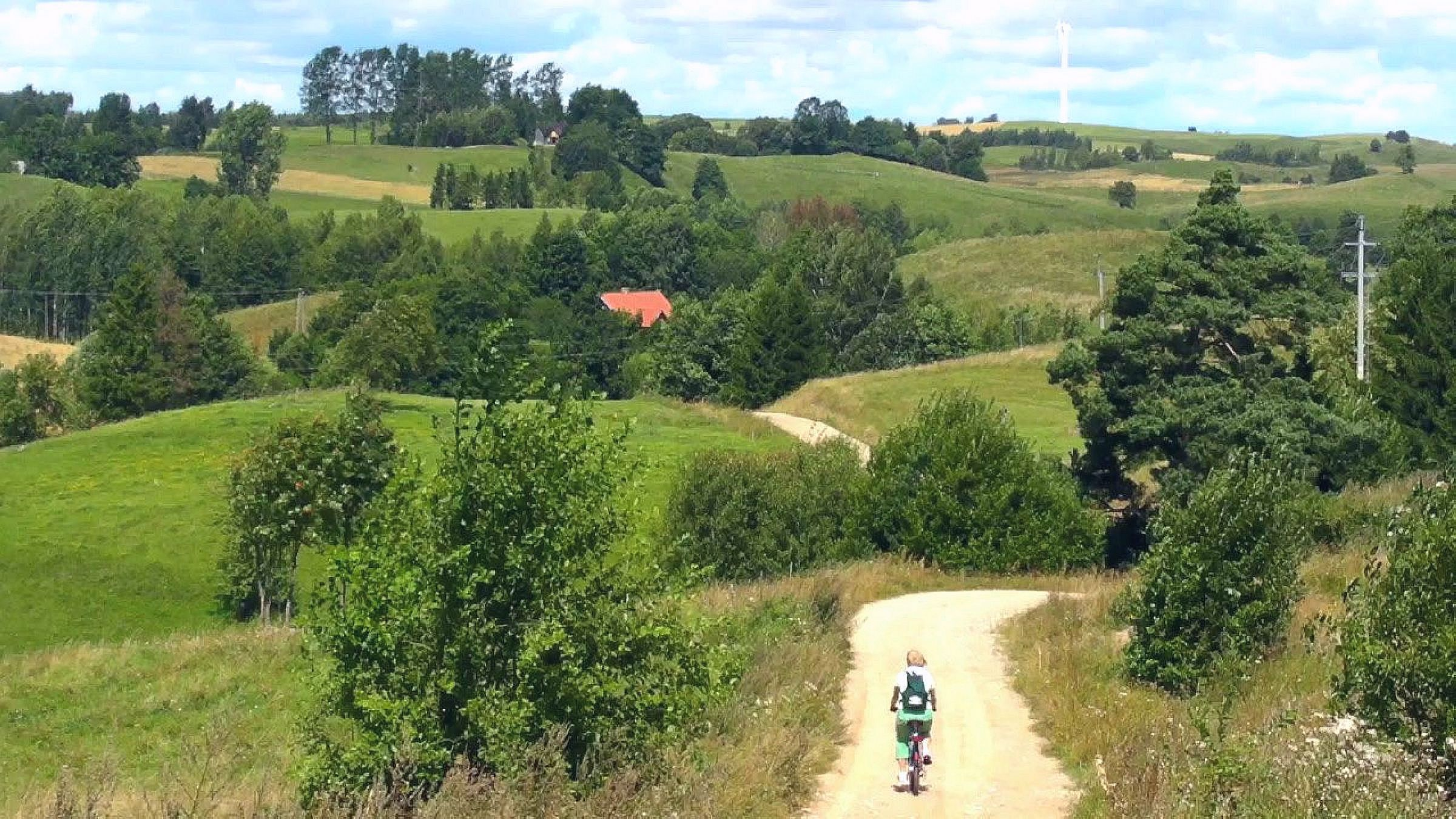

- Location within Poland
- Coordinates: 54°18′N 22°51′E
- Country: Poland
- Voivodeship: Podlaskie
- County: Suwałki
- Gmina: Wiżajny

Dzierwany [d͡ʑɛrˈvanɨ] is a village in the administrative district of Gmina Wiżajny, within Suwałki County, Podlaskie Voivodeship, in north-eastern Poland, close to the border with Lithuania.
