= Stankuny =

- Village
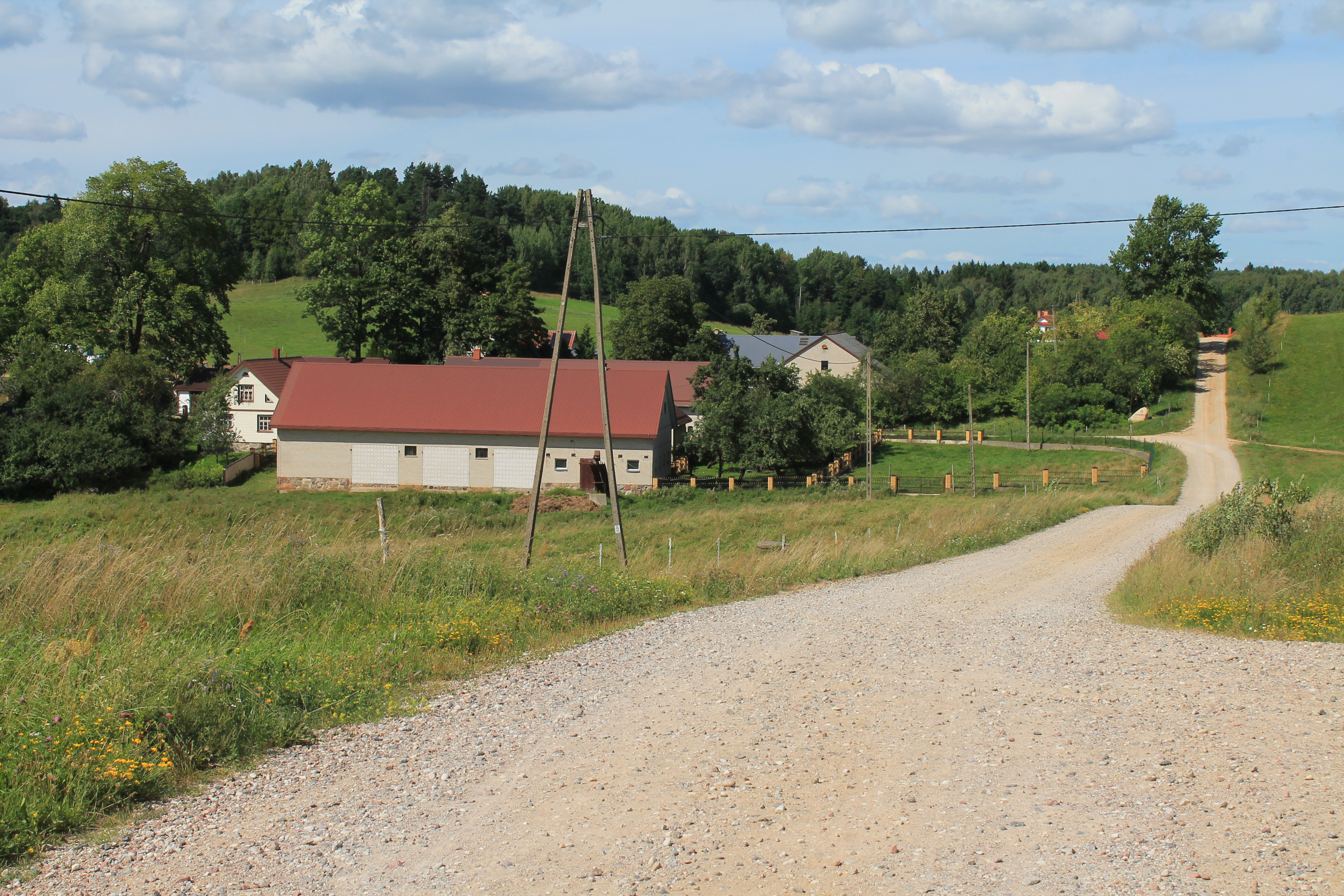
- Stankuny in 2018

- Location within Poland
- Coordinates: 54°24′4″N 22°50′47″E
- Country: Poland
- Voivodeship: Podlaskie
- County: Suwałki
- Gmina: Wiżajny
- Population: 60

Stankuny ([staŋˈkunɨ]; Lithuanian: Stankūnai) is a village in the administrative district of Gmina Wiżajny, within Suwałki County, Podlaskie Voivodeship, in north-eastern Poland, close to the border with Lithuania.
