= Sudawskie =

- Village
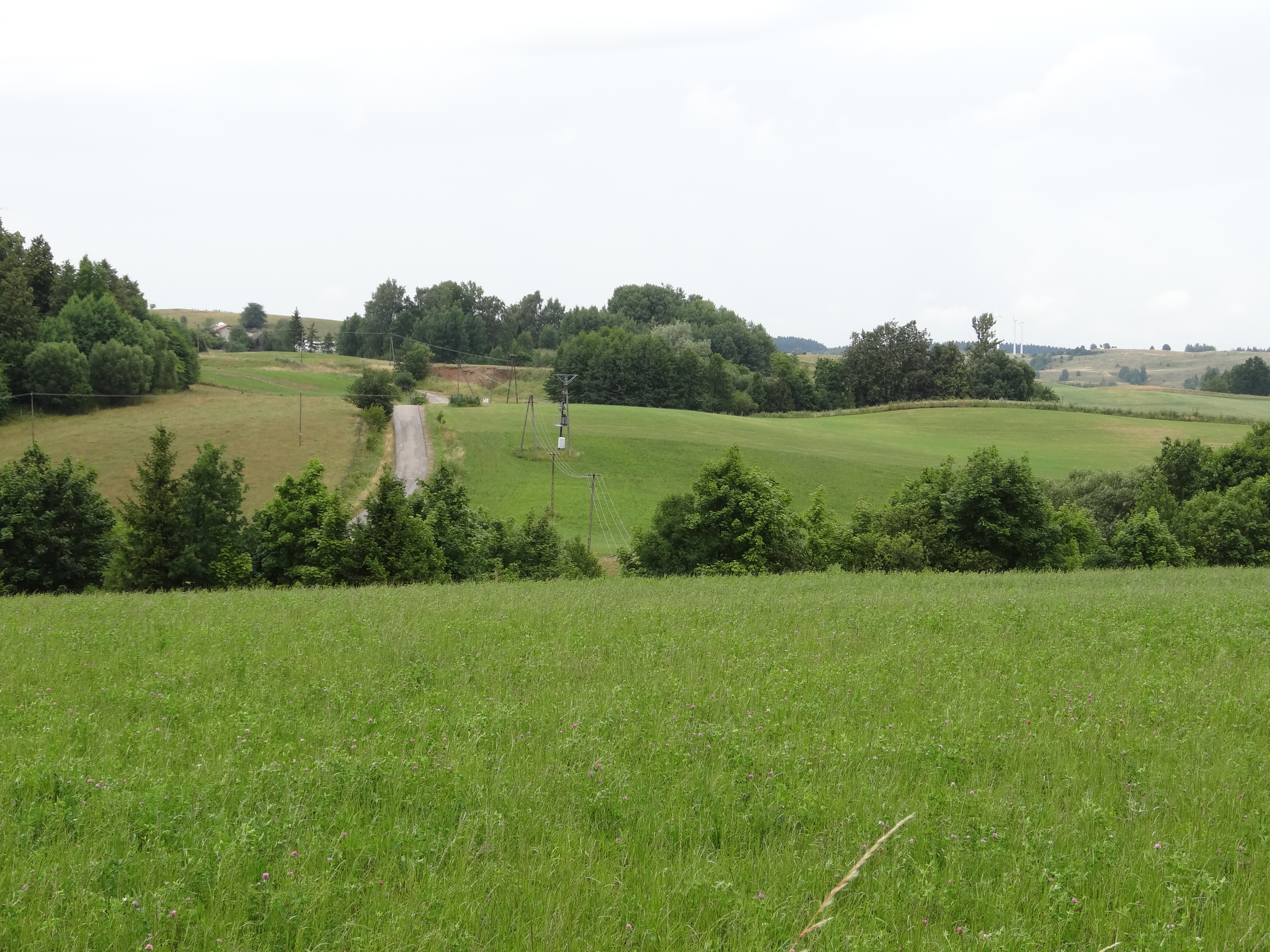
- Interactive map of Sudawskie
- Location within Poland
- Coordinates: 54°23′31″N 22°55′26″E
- Country: Poland
- Voivodeship: Podlaskie
- County: Suwałki
- Gmina: Wiżajny
- Population: 35
- Vehicle registration: BSU

Sudawskie [suˈdafskʲɛ] is a village in the administrative district of Gmina Wiżajny, within Suwałki County, Podlaskie Voivodeship, in north-eastern Poland, close to the border with Lithuania. In the years 1975–1998 the town administratively belonged to the Suwałki Voivodeship.

The moraine hills in the vicinity of the village is called Gory Sudawskie. About 0.5 km (0 mi) north of the village is the Gulberek hill with a medieval Yotvingian stronghold.

In the interwar period, a Border Protection Corps guardhouse was stationed here .

In the village there are the foundations of an 18th-century manor house surrounded by a neglected park. In the vicinity there are two fortified settlements.

== Origin of the name ==
It is likely that the name of the village comes from the Lithuanian word Sūduva or Sūduvis.
