= Wysokie, Gmina Wiżajny =

Wysokie
- Village
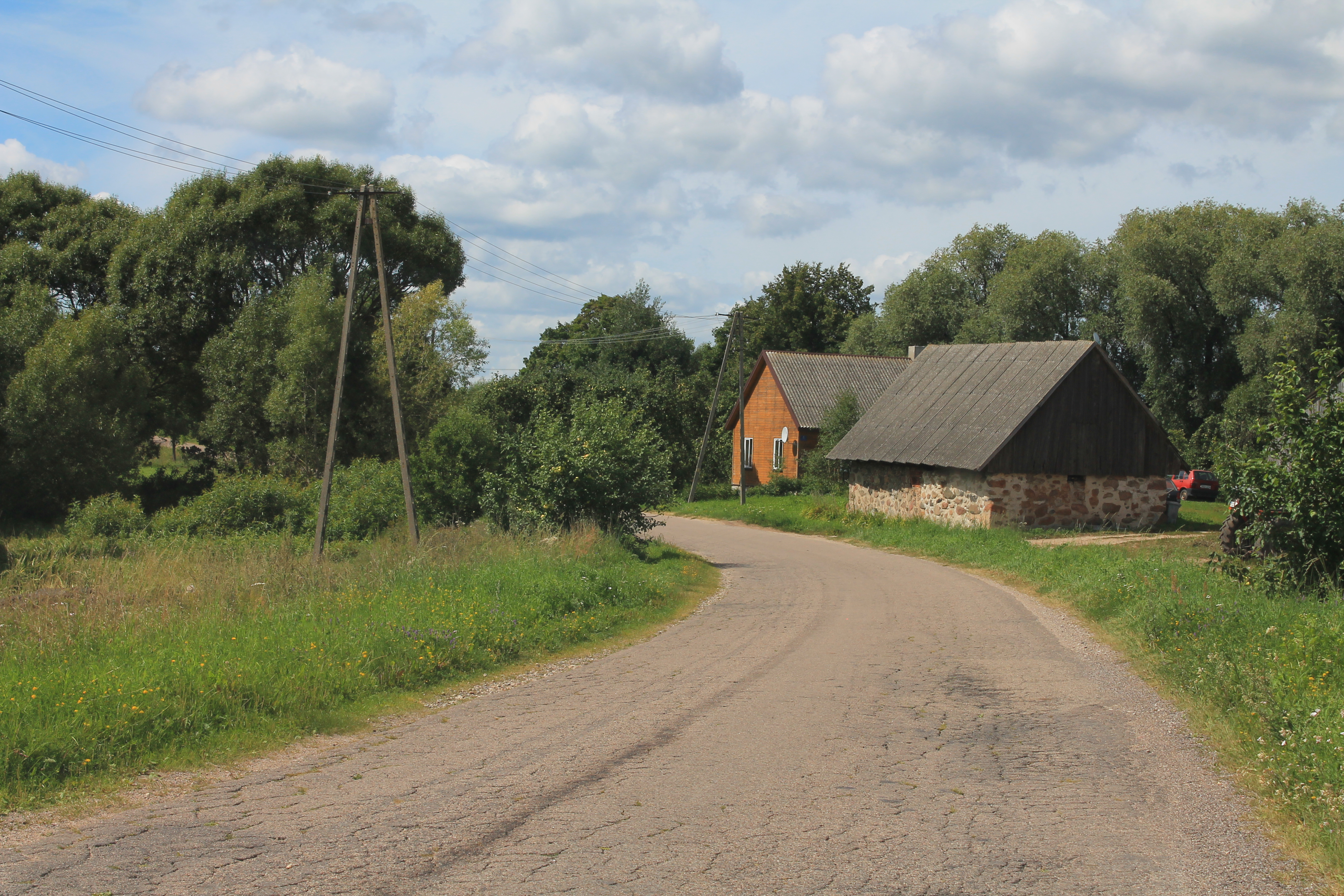

- Location within Poland
- Coordinates: 54°22′12″N 22°55′00″E
- Country: Poland
- Voivodeship: Podlaskie
- County: Suwałki
- Gmina: Wiżajny

Wysokie [vɨˈsɔkʲɛ] is a village in the administrative district of Gmina Wiżajny, within Suwałki County, Podlaskie Voivodeship, in north-eastern Poland, close to the border with Lithuania.
