= Wiżajny =

- Village
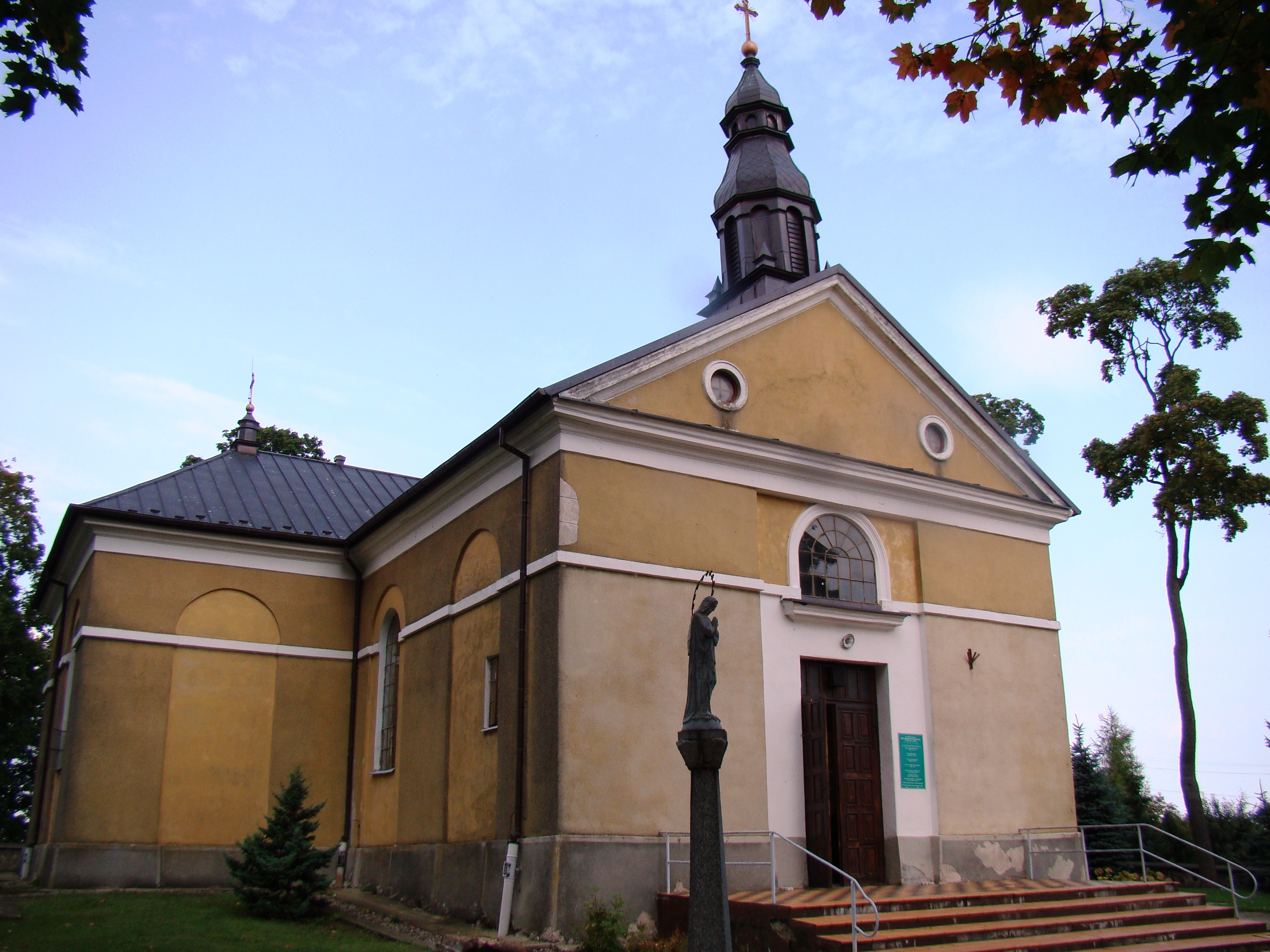
- Saint Theresa church in Wiżajny

- Location within Poland
- Coordinates: 54°23′23″N 22°51′54″E
- Country: Poland
- Voivodeship: Podlaskie
- County: Suwałki
- Gmina: Wiżajny
- First mentioned: 1253

Population
  - Total: 1,000
- Time zone: UTC+1 (CET)
  - Summer (DST): UTC+2 (CEST)
- Vehicle registration: BSU
- Website: https://www.wizajny.pl

Wiżajny ([viˈʐai̯nɨ]; Lithuanian: Vižainis) is a village in Suwałki County, Podlaskie Voivodeship, in north-eastern Poland, close to the border with Lithuania. It is the seat of the gmina (administrative district) called Gmina Wiżajny.

== History ==
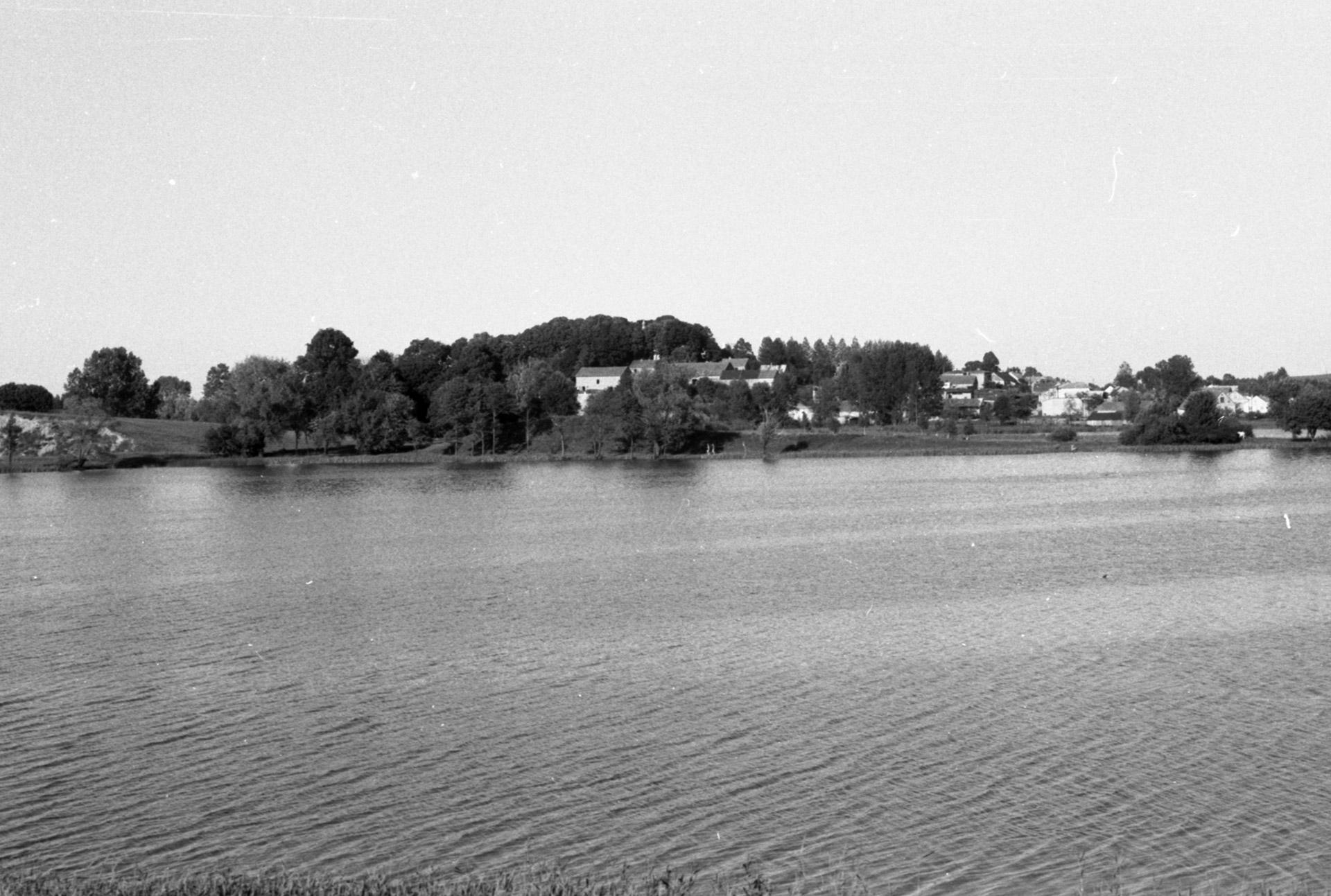
View of Wiżajny in the 1980s

In the 6th-9th centuries this area has been inhabited by the Baltic tribe of Yotvingians. The first mention of the settlement comes from 1253 when it was recorded as "Weyze", which was most likely taken from the name of a nearby lake, which in turn was derived from the Lithuanian word vėžys, or crawfish. In the 14th century there was an inn next to the road from Vilkaviškis to Sejny. According to legend, in 1409 Grand Duke of Lithuania and King of Poland Władysław Jagiełło hunted aurochs here and hence called the place Stumbrinė.

In 1570 the place was granted town status, in 1606 it had 4 streets: Stara, Wierzbołowska, Siemiańska i Sejweńska. Around 1800 the town was granted the coat of arms and right to build the town hall.

During the German occupation (World War II), the Germans arrested the local Polish parish priest Stanisław Maciątek in early November 1939 and imprisoned him in nearby Suwałki until November 11, 1939. He was arrested again in April 1940 in Mikaszówka and deported to the Soldau and Sachsenhausen concentration camps, where he died of exhaustion in June 1940 (see Nazi crimes against the Polish nation). The Germans also seized the local rectory and converted it into a customs office.

After German occupation ended, the village was restored to Poland, although with a Soviet-installed communist regime, which stayed in power until the Fall of Communism in the 1980s. The Polish anti-communist resistance was active in Wiżajny, and in 1945 it raided a local communist police station.

In 1947–1961, the local parish priest was Kazimierz Równy, former prisoner of the Soldau, Sachsenhausen and Dachau concentration camps.
