= Maszutkinie =

- Village
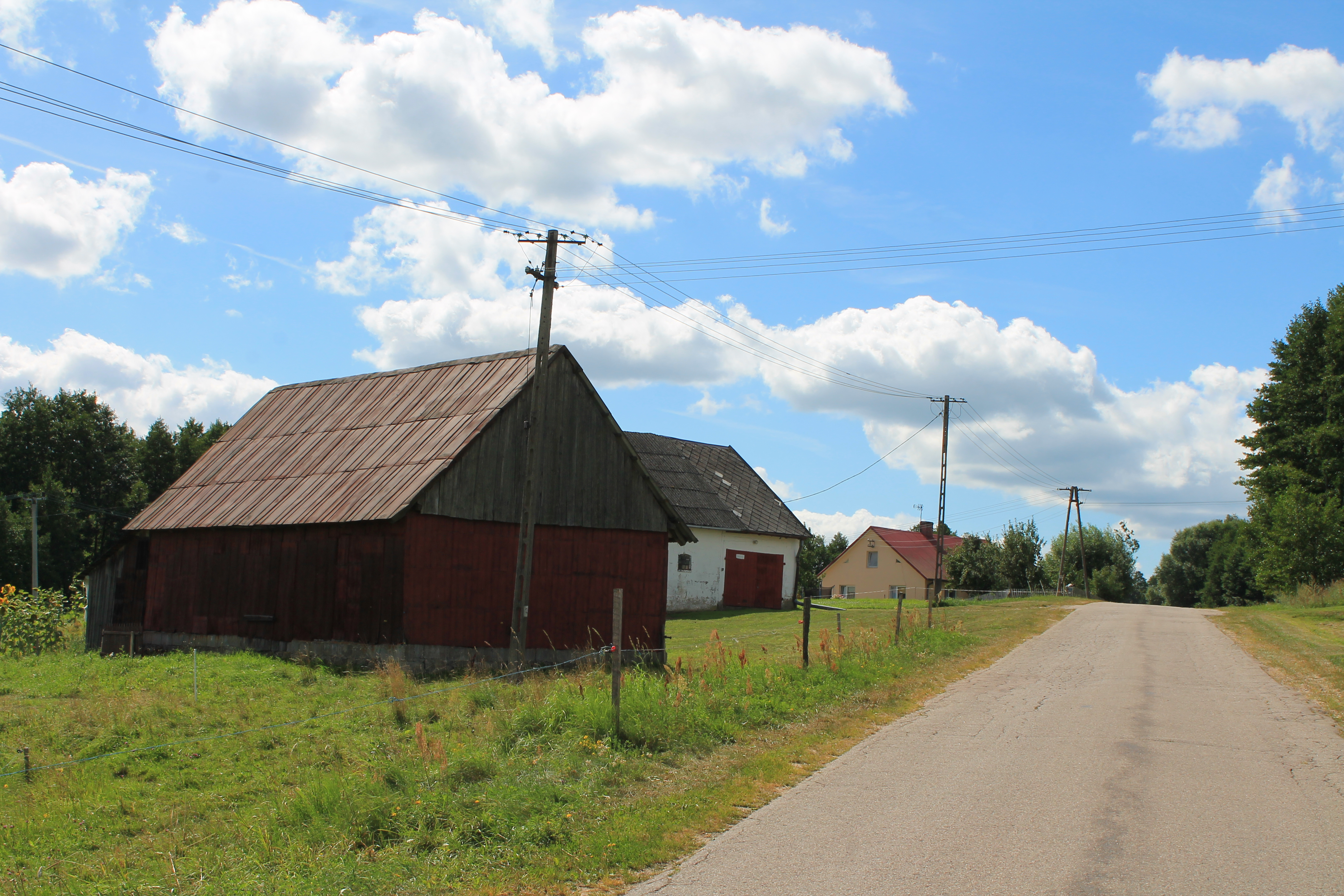

- Location within Poland
- Coordinates: 54°22′10″N 22°56′03″E
- Country: Poland
- Voivodeship: Podlaskie
- County: Suwałki
- Gmina: Wiżajny
- Population: 76

Maszutkinie [maʂutˈkiɲɛ] is a village in the administrative district of Gmina Wiżajny, within Suwałki County, Podlaskie Voivodeship, in north-eastern Poland, close to the border with Lithuania.

In the years 1954–1957 the village belonged and was the seat of the authorities of the Maszutkinie commune, after its abolition in the Wiżajny commune. In the years 1975–1998 the town administratively belonged to the Suwałki Voivodeship.

The village was founded in 1867–1868 as a result of granting 476 acres of land to 143 families of landless peasantry on the lands of the government manor of Ejszeryszki.
