= Burniszki =

- Village
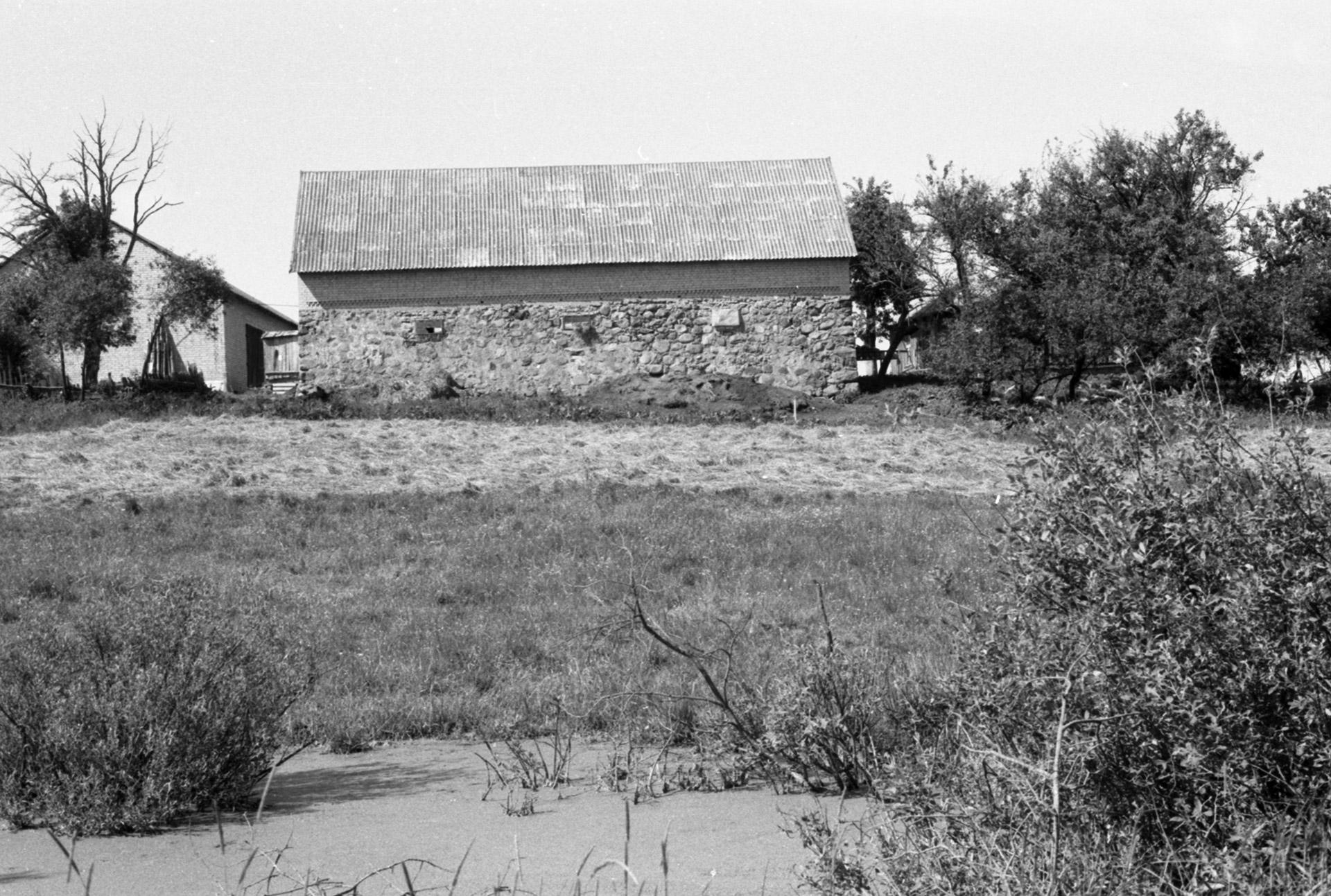

- Location within Poland
- Coordinates: 54°22′53″N 22°50′50″E
- Country: Poland
- Voivodeship: Podlaskie
- County: Suwałki
- Gmina: Wiżajny
- Population: 120

Burniszki ([burˈniʂki]; Lithuanian: Burniškės) is a village in the administrative district of Gmina Wiżajny, within Suwałki County, Podlaskie Voivodeship, in north-eastern Poland, close to the border with Lithuania.

== History ==
During the interwar period, a Border Protection Corps guard post was stationed in Burniszki.
