= Jaczne =

- Village
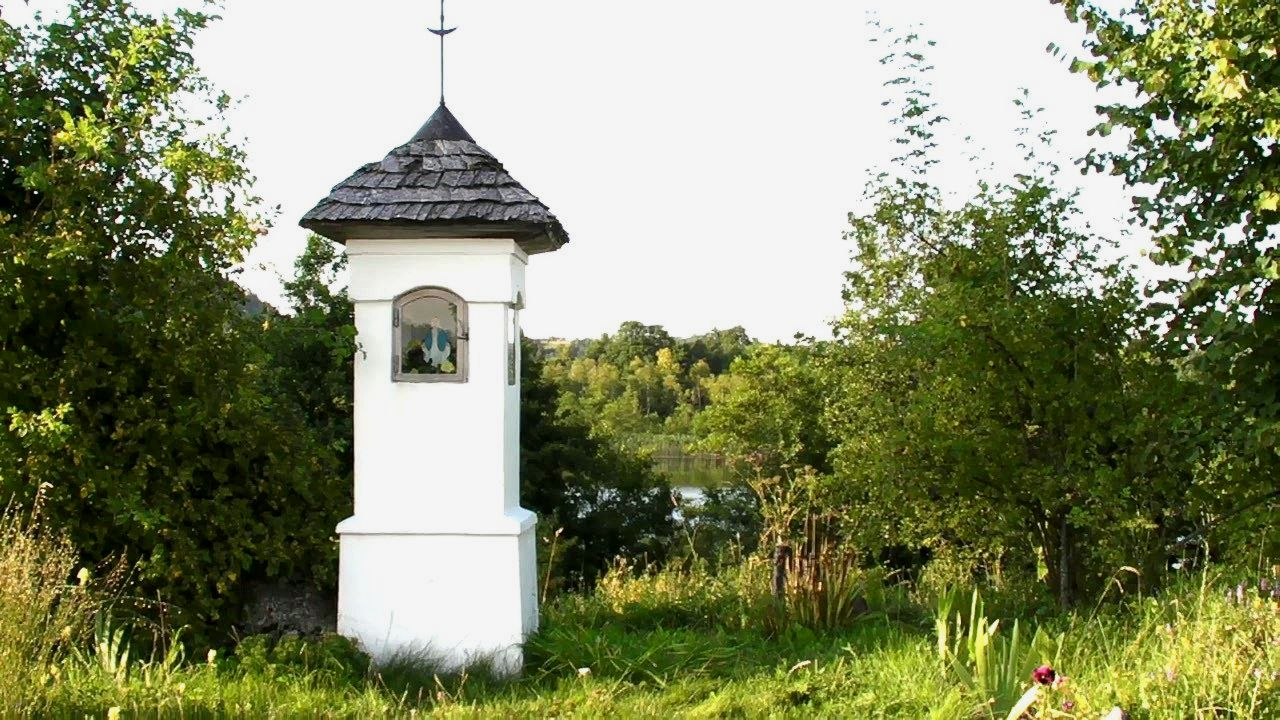

- Location within Poland
- Coordinates: 54°16′10″N 22°51′44″E
- Country: Poland
- Voivodeship: Podlaskie
- County: Suwałki
- Gmina: Wiżajny

Jaczne [ˈjat͡ʂnɛ] is a village in the administrative district of Gmina Wiżajny, within Suwałki County, Podlaskie Voivodeship, in north-eastern Poland, close to the border with Lithuania.
