= Kamionka, Suwałki County =

Kamionka
- Village
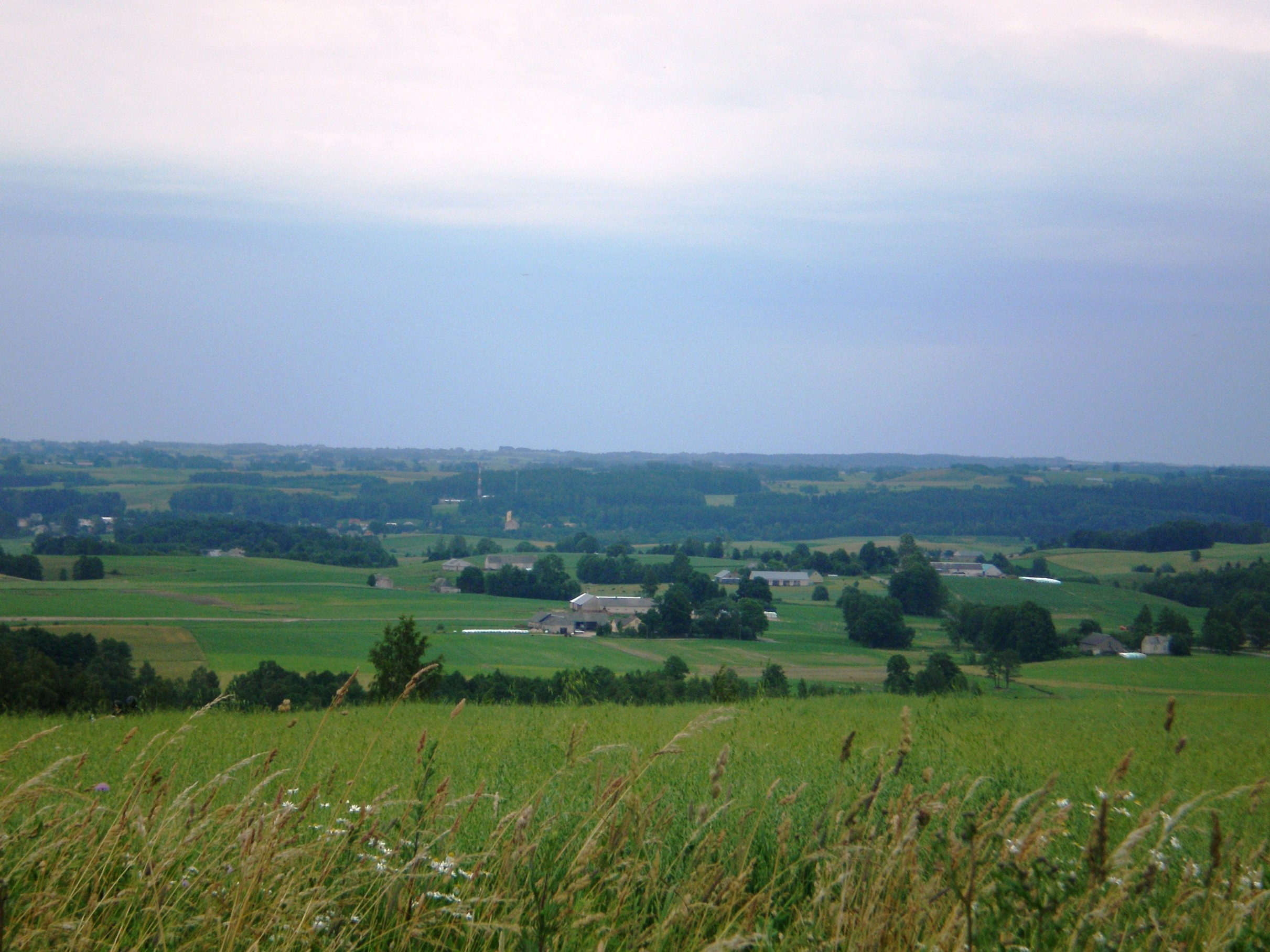

- Location within Poland
- Coordinates: 54°21′10″N 22°53′54″E
- Country: Poland
- Voivodeship: Podlaskie
- County: Suwałki
- Gmina: Wiżajny

Kamionka [kaˈmjɔnka] is a village in the administrative district of Gmina Wiżajny, within Suwałki County, Podlaskie Voivodeship, in north-eastern Poland, close to the border with Lithuania.
