= Okliny =

- Village
- Location within Poland
- Coordinates: 54°19′33″N 22°48′59″E
- Country: Poland
- Voivodeship: Podlaskie
- County: Suwałki
- Gmina: Wiżajny
- Population: 140

Okliny [ɔˈklinɨ] is a village in the administrative district of Gmina Wiżajny, within Suwałki County, Podlaskie Voivodeship, in north-eastern Poland, close to the border with Lithuania.
