= Stara Hańcza =

- Village
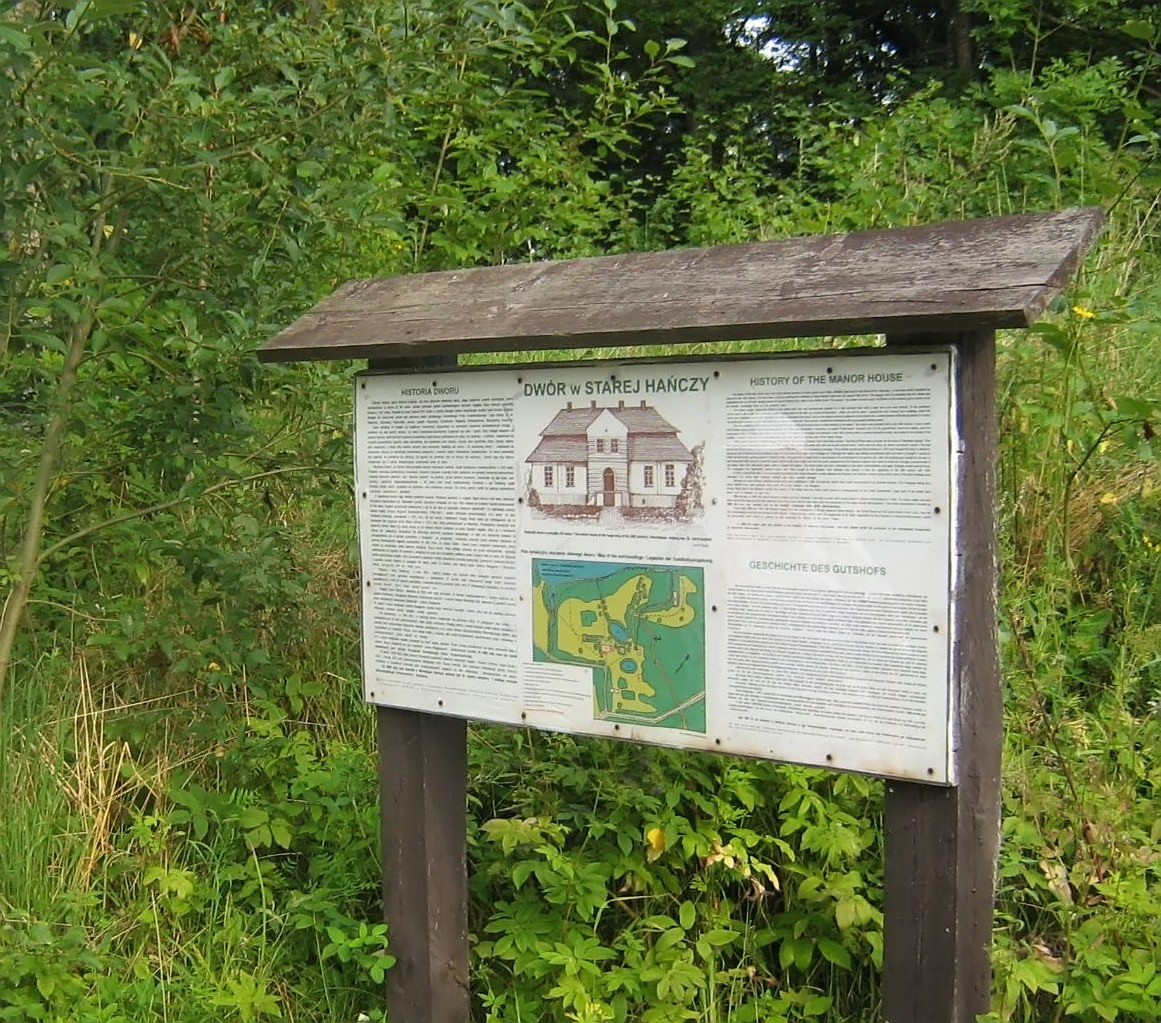

- Location within Poland
- Coordinates: 54°19′34″N 22°48′58″E
- Country: Poland
- Voivodeship: Podlaskie
- County: Suwałki
- Gmina: Wiżajny

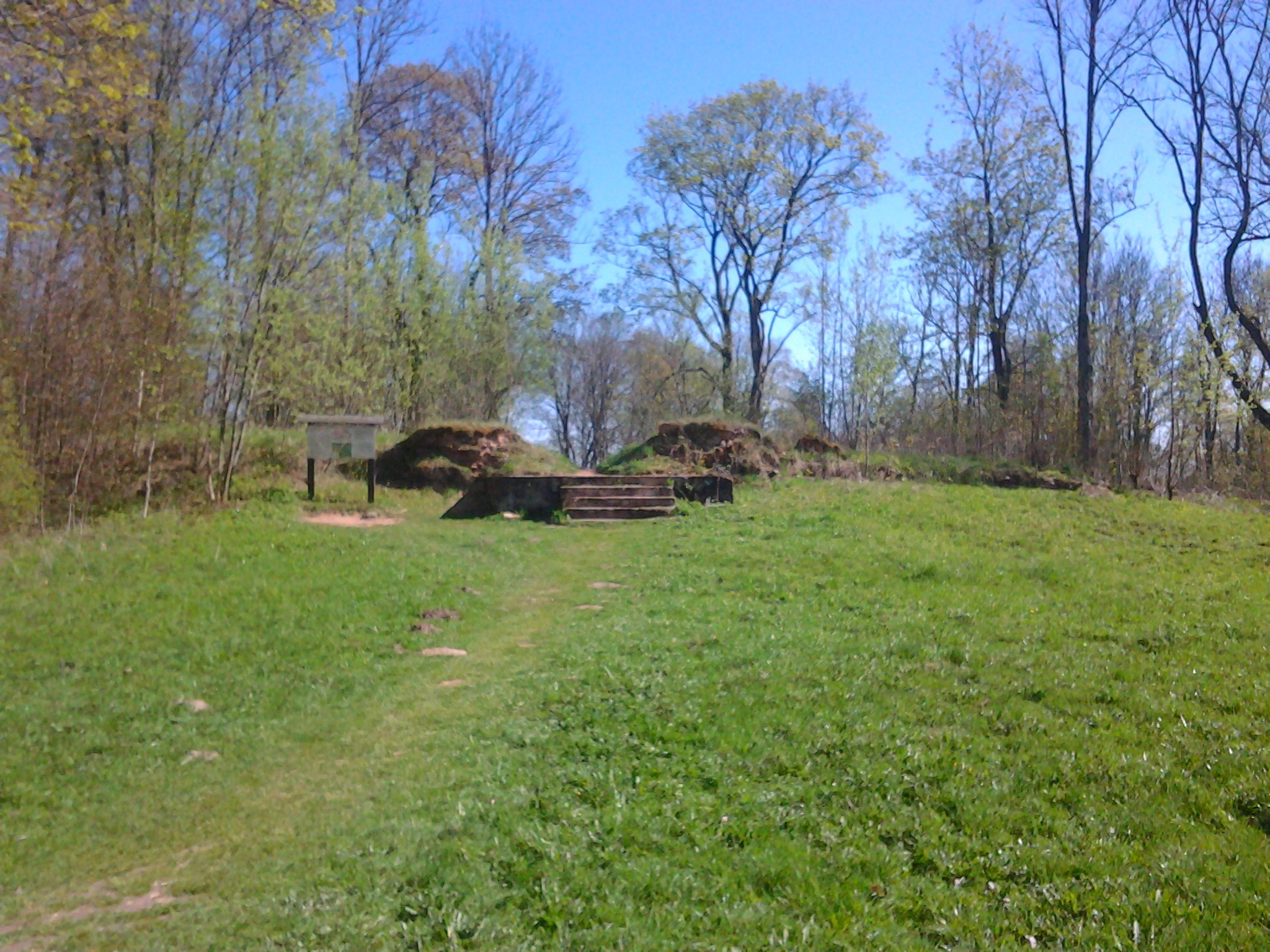
Remains of manor house

Stara Hańcza [ˈstara ˈxaɲt͡ʂa] is a village in the administrative district of Gmina Wiżajny, within Suwałki County, Podlaskie Voivodeship, in north-eastern Poland, close to the border with Lithuania.
