= Wiłkupie =

- Village
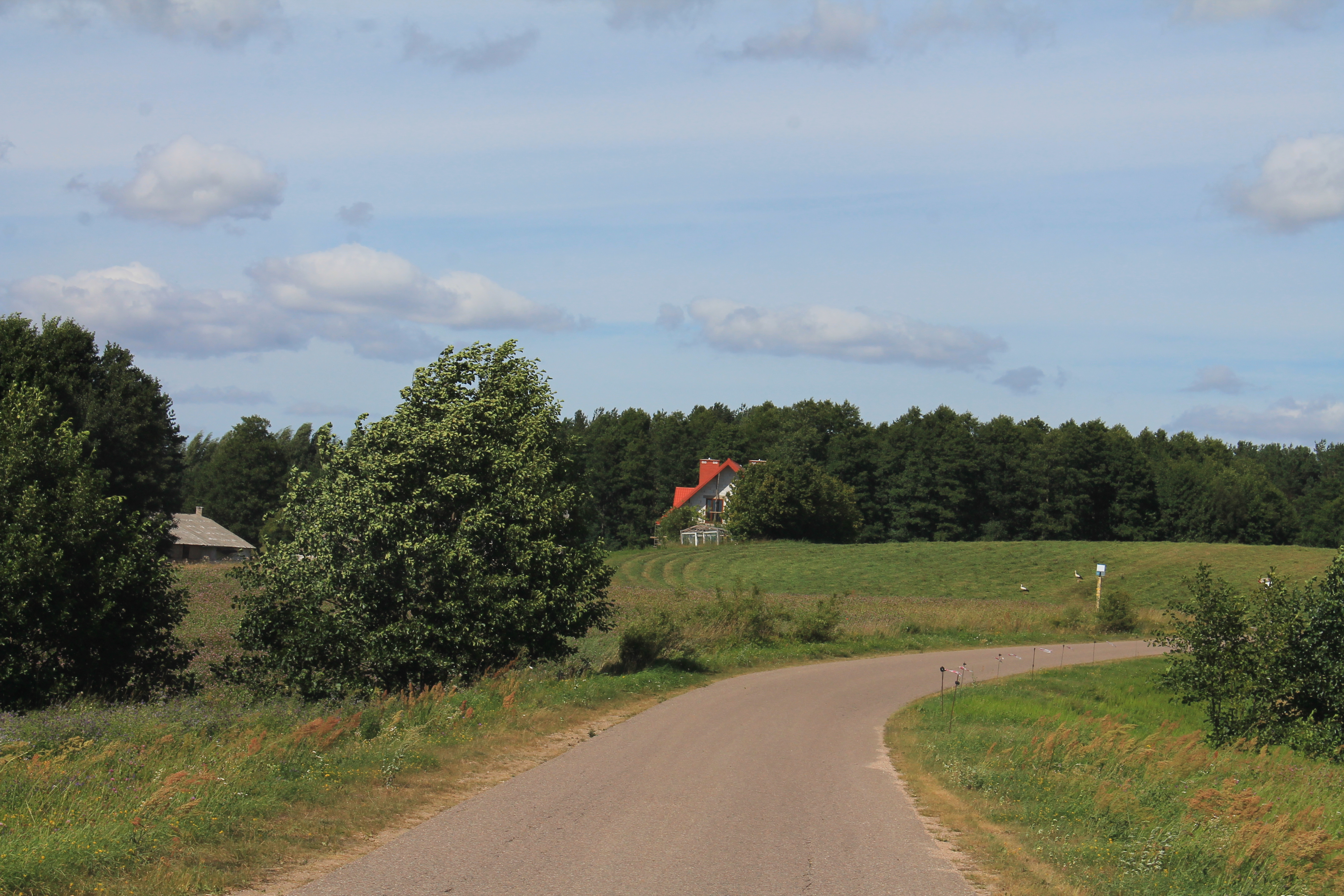
- Street of Wiłkupie

- Location within Poland
- Coordinates: 54°23′43″N 22°52′58″E
- Country: Poland
- Voivodeship: Podlaskie
- County: Suwałki
- Gmina: Wiżajny

Wiłkupie [viu̯ˈkupjɛ] is a village in the administrative district of Gmina Wiżajny, within Suwałki County, Podlaskie Voivodeship, in north-eastern Poland, close to the border with Lithuania.
