= Soliny =

- Village
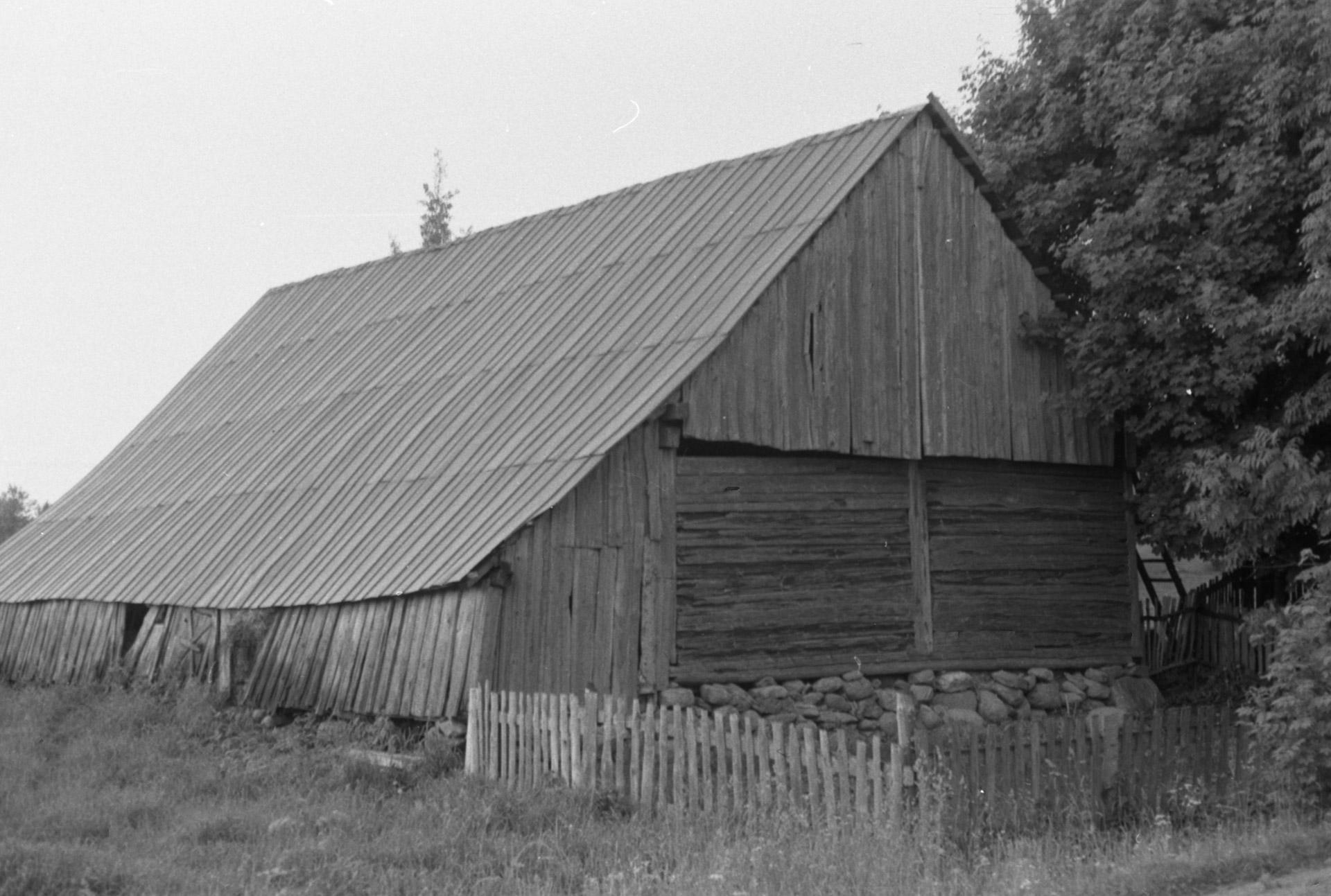
- Soliny, 1988

- Location within Poland
- Coordinates: 54°18′46″N 22°51′45″E
- Country: Poland
- Voivodeship: Podlaskie
- County: Suwałki
- Gmina: Wiżajny

Soliny [sɔˈlinɨ] is a village in the administrative district of Gmina Wiżajny, within Suwałki County, Podlaskie Voivodeship, in north-eastern Poland, close to the border with Lithuania.
