= Bolcie =

- Village
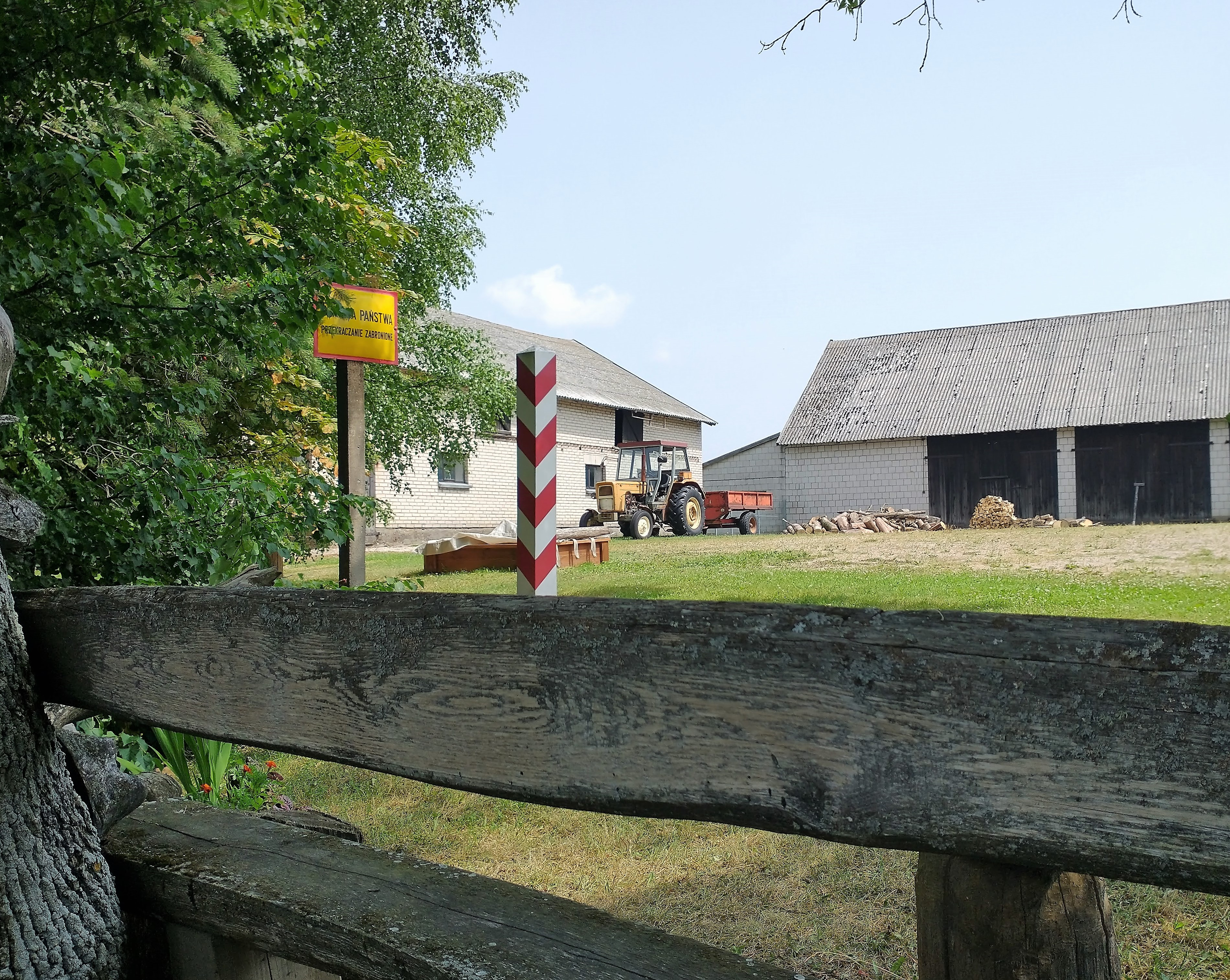

- Location within Poland
- Coordinates: 54°21′36″N 22°49′2″E
- Country: Poland
- Voivodeship: Podlaskie
- County: Suwałki
- Gmina: Wiżajny

Bolcie [ˈbɔlt͡ɕɛ] is a village in the administrative district of Gmina Wiżajny, within Suwałki County, Podlaskie Voivodeship, in north-eastern Poland, close to the border with Lithuania and Russia.
