= Marianka, Podlaskie Voivodeship =

Marianka
- Village
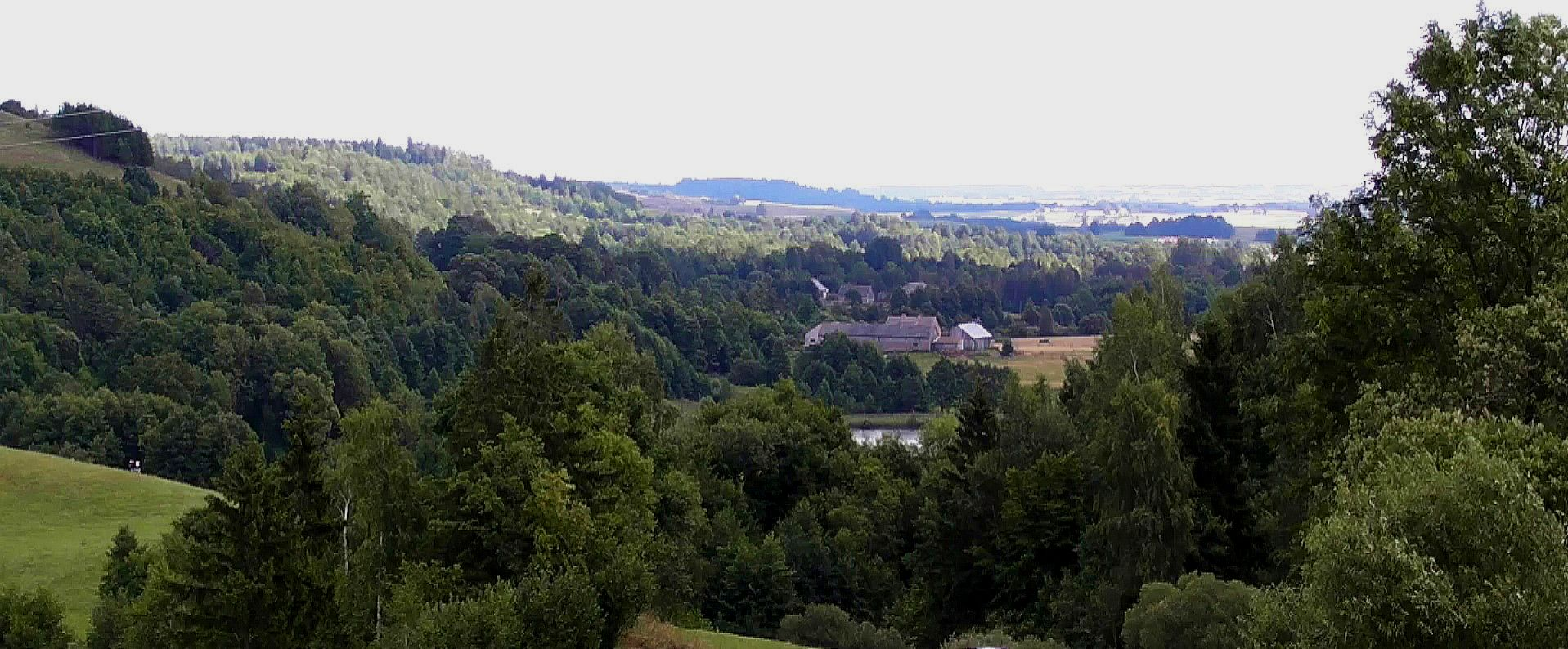
- View of the village

- Location within Poland
- Coordinates: 54°21′N 22°53′E
- Country: Poland
- Voivodeship: Podlaskie
- County: Suwałki
- Gmina: Wiżajny

Marianka [maˈrjaŋka] is a village in the administrative district of Gmina Wiżajny, within Suwałki County, Podlaskie Voivodeship, in north-eastern Poland, close to the border with Lithuania.
