= Dziadówek =

- Village
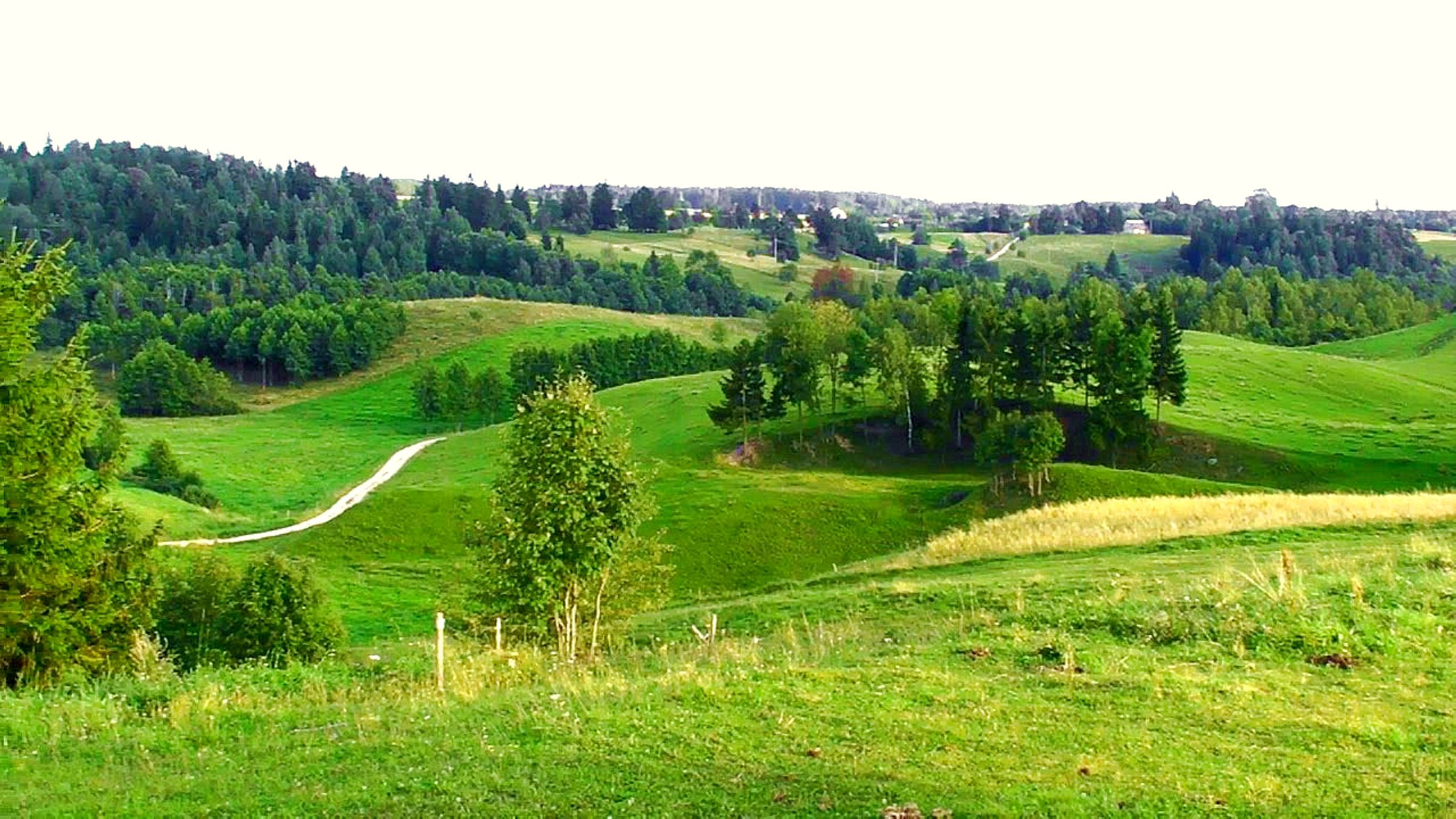

- Location within Poland
- Coordinates: 54°18′14″N 22°50′2″E
- Country: Poland
- Voivodeship: Podlaskie
- County: Suwałki
- Gmina: Wiżajny

Dziadówek [d͡ʑaˈduvɛk] is a village in the administrative district of Gmina Wiżajny, within Suwałki County, Podlaskie Voivodeship, in north-eastern Poland, close to the border with Lithuania.
