= Grzybina =

- Village
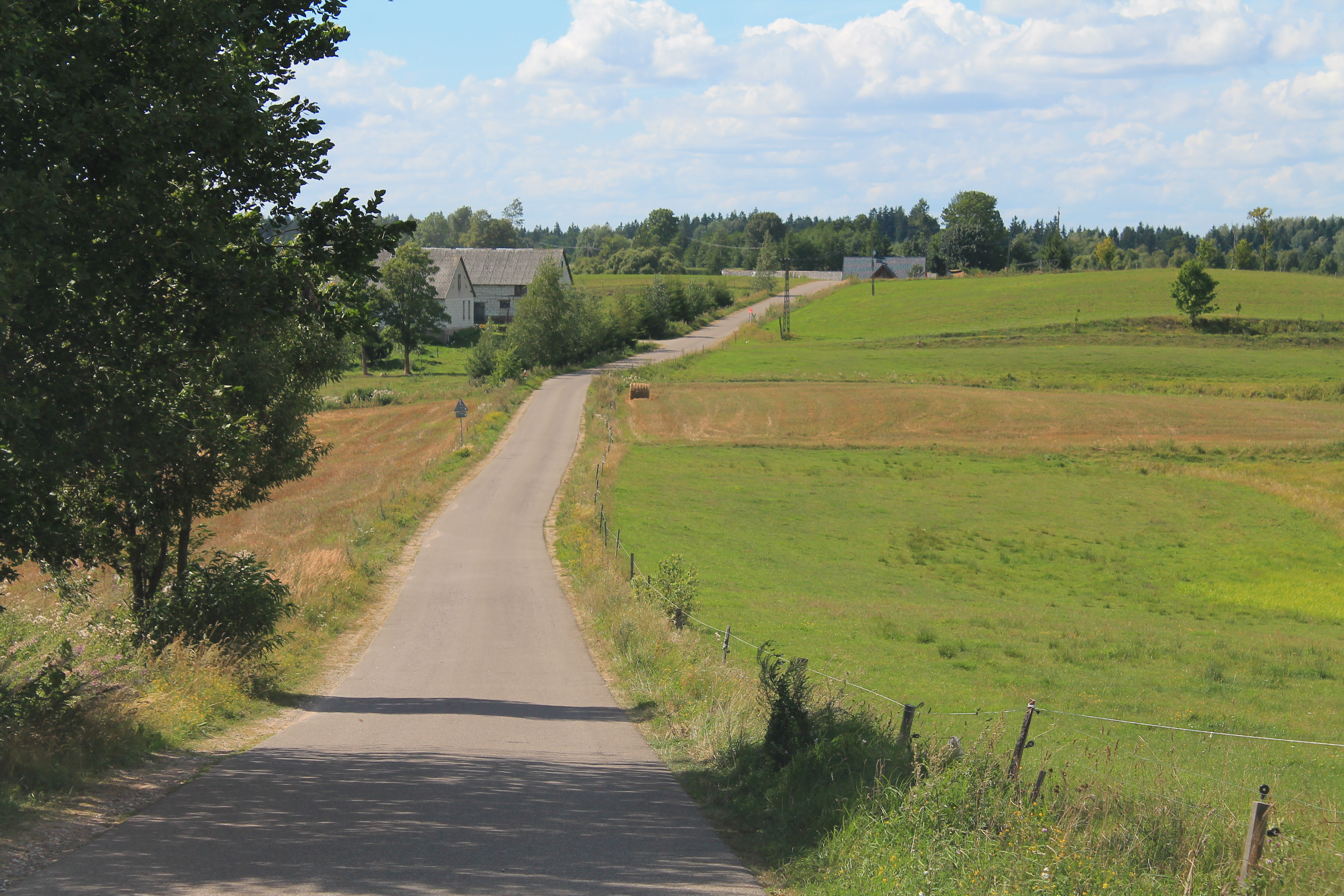
- A paved road in the village of Grzybina leading to Lithuania

- Location within Poland
- Coordinates: 54°22′15″N 22°50′33″E
- Country: Poland
- Voivodeship: Podlaskie
- County: Suwałki
- Gmina: Wiżajny
- Population (approx.): 50

Grzybina [ɡʐɨˈbina] is a village in the administrative district of Gmina Wiżajny, within Suwałki County, Podlaskie Voivodeship, in north-eastern Poland, close to the border with Lithuania.
