= Rogożajny Wielkie =

- Village
- Location within Poland
- Coordinates: 54°20′5″N 22°51′34″E
- Country: Poland
- Voivodeship: Podlaskie
- County: Suwałki
- Gmina: Wiżajny

Rogożajny Wielkie [rɔɡɔˈʐai̯nɨ ˈvjɛlkʲɛ] is a village in the administrative district of Gmina Wiżajny, within Suwałki County, Podlaskie Voivodeship, in north-eastern Poland, close to the border with Lithuania.
