= Kłajpedka =

- Village
- Location within Poland
- Coordinates: 54°17′41″N 22°48′14″E
- Country: Poland
- Voivodeship: Podlaskie
- County: Suwałki
- Gmina: Wiżajny

Kłajpedka [kwai̯ˈpɛtka] is a village in the administrative district of Gmina Wiżajny, within Suwałki County, Podlaskie Voivodeship, in north-eastern Poland, close to the border with Lithuania.

From the 8th century B.C. until the 19th century, the Jotvingians, a Baltic tribe close to the Lithuanians, lived in this territory. From the 13th to the 14th century. until 1795 the village belonged to the Grand Duchy of Lithuania. According to the July 12 peace treaty between Lithuania and Soviet Union, the village was assigned to the Republic of Lithuania.
