= Gmina Wiżajny =

Gmina Wiżajny Wiżajny Commune
- Gmina
- Flag Coat of arms

- Gmina Wiżajny within the Suwałki County
- Coordinates (Wiżajny): 54°23′23″N 22°51′54″E
- Country: Poland
- Voivodeship: Podlaskie
- County: Suwałki County
- Seat: Wiżajny

Area
  - Total: 122.59 km^{2} (47.33 sq mi)

Population (2006)
  - Total: 2,672
  - Density: 21.80/km^{2} (56.45/sq mi)
- Vehicle registration: BSU
- Website: http://www.wizajny.pl

Gmina Wiżajny, is a rural gmina (administrative district) in Suwałki County, Podlaskie Voivodeship, in north-eastern Poland, on the Lithuanian border. Its seat is the village of Wiżajny, which lies approximately 35 kilometres (22 mi) north of Suwałki and 143 km (89 mi) north of the regional capital Białystok.

The gmina covers an area of 122.59 square kilometres (47.3 sq mi), and as of 2006 its total population is 2,672.

The gmina contains part of the protected area called Suwałki Landscape Park.

== Villages ==
Gmina Wiżajny contains the villages and settlements of Antosin, Bolcie, Burniszki, Cisówek, Dziadówek, Dzierwany, Grzybina, Jaczne, Jegliniszki, Kamionka, Kłajpeda, Kłajpedka, Laskowskie, Leszkiemie, Ługiele, Makowszczyzna, Marianka, Maszutkinie, Mauda, Mierkinie, Okliny, Poplin, Rogożajny Małe, Rogożajny Wielkie, Soliny, Stankuny, Stara Hańcza, Stołupianka, Sudawskie, Sześciwłóki, Użmauda, Wiłkupie, Wiżajny, Wiżgóry, Wysokie and Żelazkowizna.

== Neighbouring gminas ==
Gmina Wiżajny is bordered by the gminas of Dubeninki, Jeleniewo, Przerośl and Rutka-Tartak. It also borders Lithuania.
