= Granitas Klaipėda =

Granitas Klaipėda can refer to:

- FK Atlantas, a Lithuanian football club which was known as Granitas Klaipėda in the past.
- FK Klaipėdos Granitas, a Lithuanian football club founded in 2012.
