= Poplin, Missouri =

Extinct town in the American state of Missouri

Coordinates: 36.78644°N 90.14899°W

Poplin is an extinct town in Stoddard County, in the U.S. state of Missouri.

A post office called Poplin was established in 1884, and remained in operation until 1886. The community has the name of G. L. Poplin.
