= Coat of arms of Klaipėda =

Current coat of arms of Klaipėda.

The flag with the coat of arms of Klaipėda.

Coat of arms of Klaipėda is the coat of arms of the city of Klaipėda, Lithuania. It is used as coat of arms of Klaipėda city municipality.

The modern rendition was designed by the designer Kęstutis Mickevičius. The modern coat of arms was created by restoring old seals of the city of Memel (analogous with those used in the years 1446, 1605 and 1618; Memel is the German name for the city (Mimmelsburg), used when it belonged to the Kingdom of Prussia). It was affirmed on July 1, 1992.

The charges are a stone castle with a boat beneath it on a gules field, with four stars around the towers of the stone castle. They have been rendered somewhat differently through the years but always in line with the blazon.

The flag of the city depicts the coat of arms upon a square cloth vertically parted in the colours of the arms.

== Gallery ==
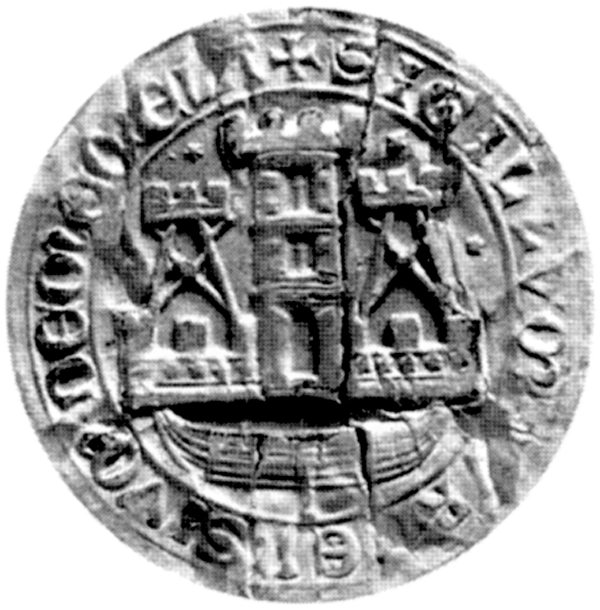
Klaipėda city seal, 1446 (diameter 75 mm). From the secret archive of National Prussian Cultural Heritage, Berlin

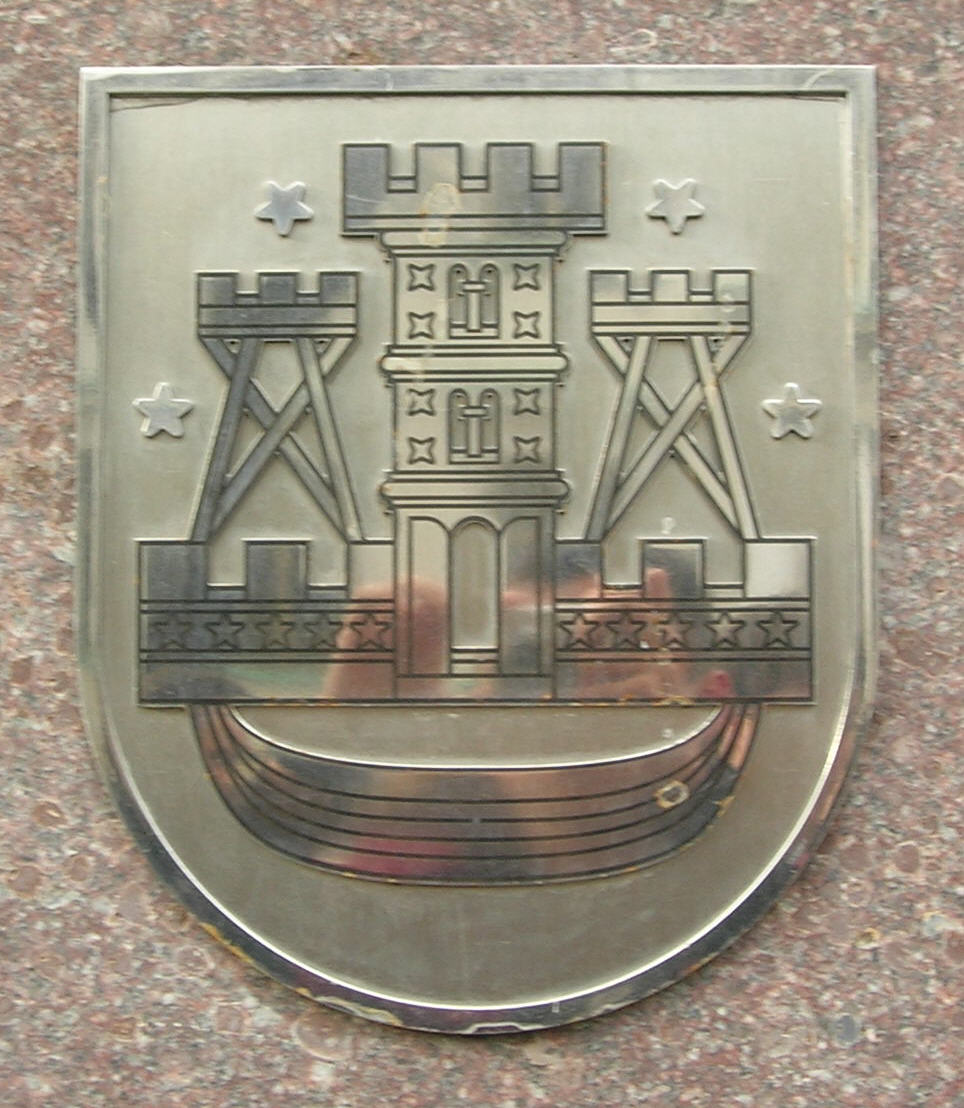
The coat of arms on the Klaipėda city municipality building

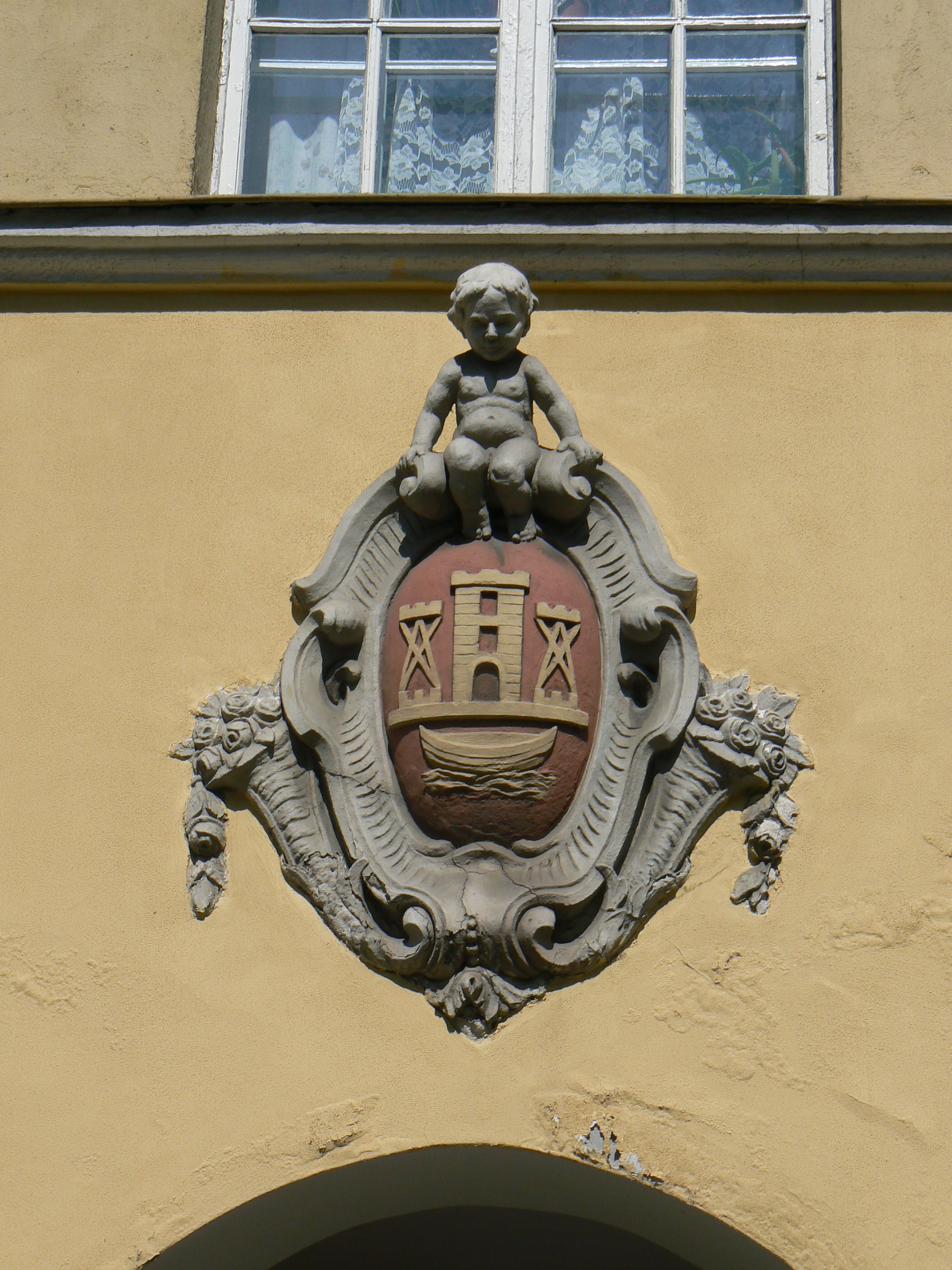
The coat of arms on Tiltų street 1 building

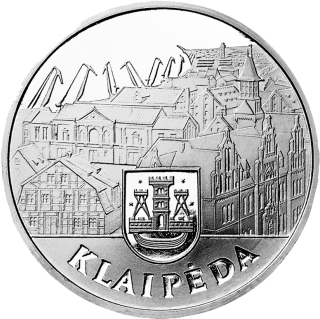
The arms on the Litas commemorative coin dedicated to Klaipėda city in 2002

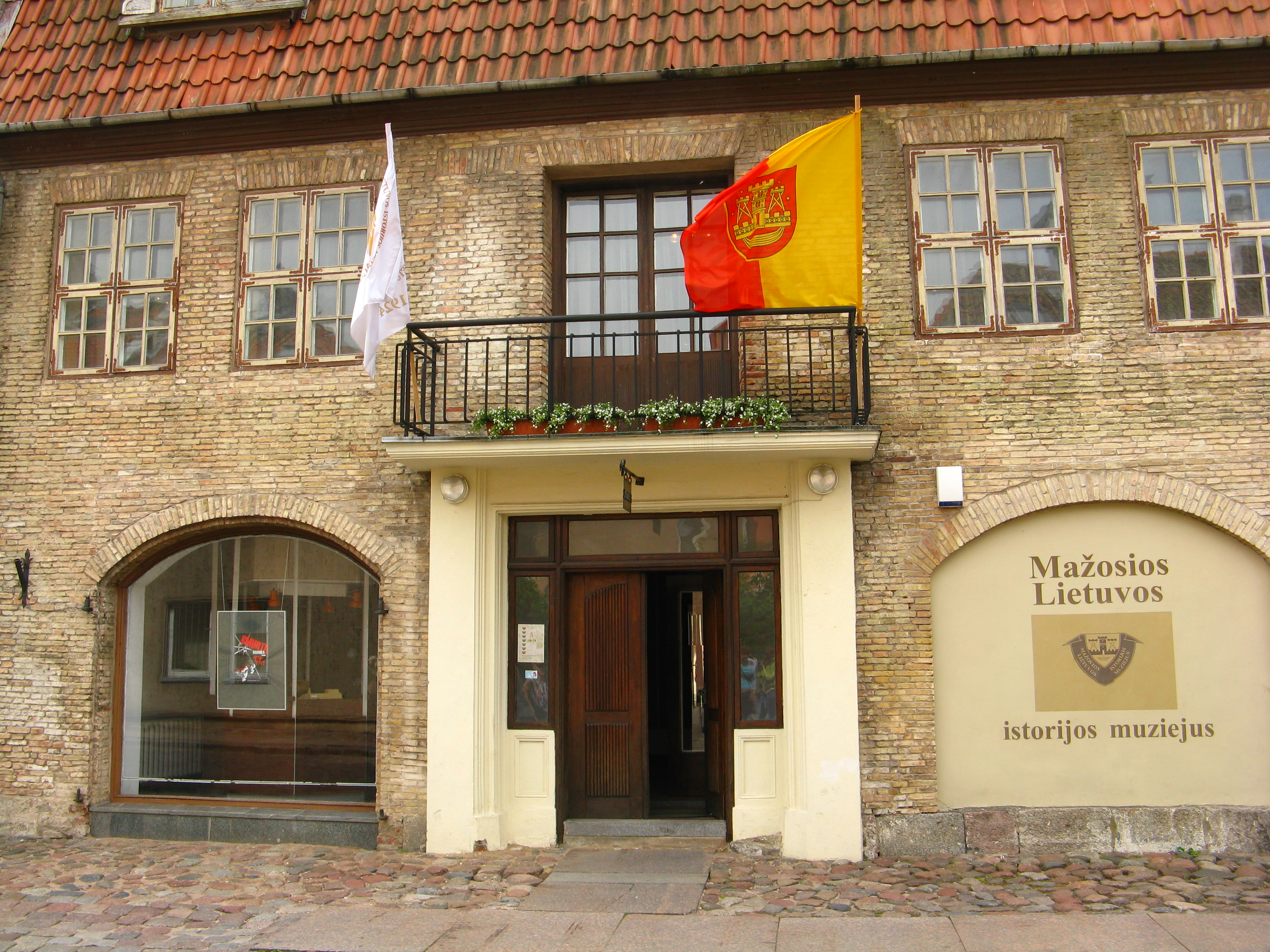
The flag at the Lithuania Minor Historical Museum

The coat of arms of Memelland (Klaipėda Region) used from 1919 until 1924

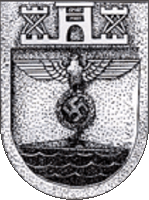
The coat of arms of Memelland (Klaipėda Region) used from 1939 until 1945

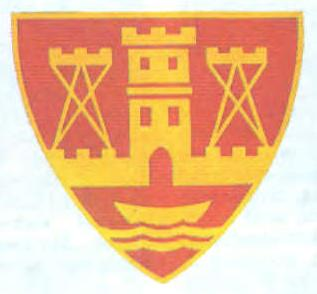
The coat of arms of Klaipėda as of 1970
