= List of Poa species =

The following species in the grass genus Poa are accepted by Plants of the World Online. Speciation in this genus is marked by interspecific and even intergeneric hybridization events.

- Poa abbreviata R.Br.
- Poa acicularifolia Buchanan
- Poa acinaciphylla É.Desv.
- Poa acroleuca Steud.
- Poa adusta J.Presl
- Poa aequalis (Swallen & Tovar) Refulio
- Poa aequatoriensis Hack.
- Poa aequigluma Tovar
- Poa affinis R.Br.
- Poa afghanica Bor
- Poa aitchisonii Boiss.
- Poa ajanensis Prob.
- Poa akmanii Soreng, P.Hein & H.Scholz
- Poa alberti Regel
- Poa albescens Hitchc.
- Poa × alexandrae Prob.
- Poa almasovii Golub
- Poa alopecurus (Gaudich. ex Mirb.) Kunth
- Poa alpigena Lindm.
- Poa alpina L.
- Poa alsodes A.Gray
- Poa alta Hitchc.
- Poa amplexicaulis C.M.Weiller & Stajsic
- Poa amplivaginata (Tovar) Refulio
- Poa amurica Prob.
- Poa anae Tovar
- Poa anceps G.Forst.
- Poa androgyna Hack.
- Poa angustifolia L.
- Poa ankaratrensis A.Camus & H.Perrier
- Poa annua L.
- Poa antipoda Petrie
- Poa apiculata Refulio
- Poa arachnifera Torr.
- Poa araratica Trautv.
- Poa archarensis Prob.
- Poa arctica R.Br.
- Poa arechavaletae Parodi
- Poa arida Vasey
- Poa arnowiae Soreng
- Poa arzhanensis Nosov
- Poa asirensis Cope
- Poa asperifolia Bor
- Poa astonii Petrie
- Poa atropidiformis Hack.
- Poa atropurpurea Scribn.
- Poa attalica (H.Scholz) Soreng, Cabi & L.J.Gillespie
- Poa attenuata Trin.
- Poa aucklandica Petrie
- Poa auriculata Soreng & P.M.Peterson
- Poa aurigae Veldkamp
- Poa × austrohercynica Wein
- Poa austrokurilensis Prob. & Barkalov
- Poa austrouralensis Tzvelev
- Poa autumnalis Muhl. ex Elliott
- Poa ayacuchensis Tovar
- Poa ayseniensis Hack.
- Poa babiogorensis Bernátová & Májovský & Obuch
- Poa bactriana Roshev.
- Poa badensis Haenke ex Willd.
- Poa bajaensis Soreng
- Poa balbisii Parl.
- Poa banffiana (Soreng) Soreng & L.J.Gillespie
- Poa bergii Hieron.
- Poa beringiana Prob.
- Poa bigelovii Vasey ex Scribn.
- Poa binata Nees
- Poa binodis Keng f. ex L.Liu
- Poa bolanderi Vasey
- Poa boliviana Refulio
- Poa bomiensis C.Ling
- Poa bonariensis (Lam.) Kunth
- Poa borbonica Poir.
- Poa boreorossica Tzvelev
- Poa borneensis Jansen
- Poa bradei Pilg.
- Poa breviglumis Hook.f.
- Poa brevis Hitchc.
- Poa bromoides Vahl
- Poa buchananii Zotov
- Poa bucharica Roshev.
- Poa bulbosa L.
- Poa burmanica Bor
- Poa bussmannii H.Scholz
- Poa cabreriana Anton & Ariza
- Poa calchaquiensis Hack.
- Poa calliopsis Litv. ex Ovcz.
- Poa callosa Stapf
- Poa calycina (J.Presl) Kunth
- Poa carazensis Pilg.
- Poa carpatica (V.Jirásek) Chopik
- Poa caucasica Trin.
- Poa celebica Veldkamp
- Poa celsa Edgar
- Poa cenisia All.
- Poa chaixii Vill.
- Poa chamaeclinos Pilg.
- Poa chambersii Soreng
- Poa chapmaniana Scribn.
- Poa chathamica Petrie
- Poa cheelii Vickery
- Poa chirripoensis R.W.Pohl
- Poa chokensis S.M.Phillips
- Poa cita Edgar
- Poa clavigera Veldkamp
- Poa clelandii Vickery
- Poa clivicola Vickery
- Poa × coarctata Haller f. ex Gaudin
- Poa cockayneana Petrie
- Poa colensoi Hook.f.
- Poa colombiana Soreng & Sylvester
- Poa × complanata Schur
- Poa compressa L.
- Poa confinis Vasey
- Poa congesta Refulio
- Poa cookii (Hook.f.) Hook.f.
- Poa cooperi Noltie
- Poa cordemoyi Renvoize
- Poa costiniana Vickery
- Poa crassicaudex Vickery
- Poa crassicaulis Pilg.
- Poa crassinervis Honda
- Poa cucullata Hack.
- Poa cumingii Trin.
- Poa curtifolia Scribn.
- Poa cusickii Vasey
- Poa cuspidata Nutt.
- Poa cyrenaica E.A.Durand & Barratte
- Poa czazhmensis Prob.
- Poa damavandica Assadi & Kavousi
- Poa darwiniana Parodi
- Poa davisii Bor
- Poa deminuta Refulio
- Poa densa Troitsky
- Poa denticulata Hack.
- Poa dentigluma Tovar
- Poa denudata Steud.
- Poa diaboli Soreng & Keil
- Poa diaphora Trin.
- Poa × digena Melderis
- Poa dimorphantha Murb.
- Poa dipsacea Petrie
- Poa disjecta Ovcz.
- Poa dissanthelioides Tovar
- Poa diversifolia (Boiss. & Balansa) Hack. ex Boiss.
- Poa dolichophylla Hack.
- Poa dolosa Boiss. & Heldr.
- Poa douglasii Nees
- Poa dozyi Veldkamp
- Poa drummondiana Nees
- Poa dudkinii Prob.
- Poa durifolia Giussani, Nicora & Roig
- Poa dzongicola Noltie
- Poa egorovae Tzvelev
- Poa eleanorae Bor
- Poa ensiformis Vickery
- Poa epileuca (Stapf) Stapf
- Poa erectifolia Hitchc.
- Poa exigua Hook.f.
- Poa faberi Rendle
- Poa falconeri Hook.f.
- Poa fauriei Hack.
- Poa fawcettiae Vickery
- Poa fax J.H.Willis & Court
- Poa fendleriana (Steud.) Vasey
- Poa ferreyrae Tovar
- Poa fibrifera Pilg.
- Poa × figertii Gerhardt
- Poa filiculmis Roshev.
- Poa fischeri Prob.
- Poa flabellata (Lam.) Raspail
- Poa flaccidula Boiss. & Reut.
- Poa flexuosa Sm.
- Poa foliosa (Hook.f.) Hook.f.
- Poa fordeana F.Muell.
- Poa × fossae-rusticorum Wein
- Poa fragilis Ovcz.
- Poa gamblei Bor
- Poa gammieana Hook.f.
- Poa × gandogeri Fedde
- Poa garhwalensis D.C.Nautiyal & R.D.Gaur
- Poa × gaspensis Fernald
- Poa gayana É.Desv.
- Poa gigantea (Tovar) Refulio
- Poa gilgiana Pilg.
- Poa glaberrima Tovar
- Poa glauca Vahl
- Poa gnutikovii Prob.
- Poa golestanensis H.Scholz & Akhani
- Poa grandis Hand.-Mazz.
- Poa granitica Braun-Blanq.
- Poa greuteri Gabrieljan
- Poa grisebachii R.E.Fr.
- Poa guadianensis (F.M.Vázquez) F.M.Vázquez
- Poa gunnii Vickery
- Poa gymnantha Pilg.
- Poa hachadoensis Nicora
- Poa hackelii Post
- Poa hakusanensis Hack.
- Poa halmaturina J.M.Black
- Poa hartzii Gand.
- Poa harveyi Chrtek
- Poa hedbergii S.M.Phillips
- Poa helenae Veldkamp
- Poa helmsii Vickery
- Poa hentyi Veldkamp
- Poa × herjedalica Harry Sm.
- Poa hesperia Edgar
- Poa hideaki-ohbae Rajbh.
- Poa hiemata Vickery
- Poa hieronymi Hack.
- Poa himalayana Nees ex Steud.
- Poa hirtiglumis Hook.f.
- Poa hisauchii Honda
- Poa hissarica Roshev.
- Poa hitchcockiana Soreng & P.M.Peterson
- Poa holciformis J.Presl
- Poa homomalla Nees
- Poa hookeri Vickery
- Poa horridula Pilg.
- Poa hothamensis Vickery
- Poa howellii Vasey & Scribn.
- Poa huancavelicae Tovar
- Poa hubbardiana Parodi
- Poa huecu Parodi
- Poa humilis Ehrh. ex Hoffm.
- Poa humillima Pilg.
- Poa hybrida Gaudin
- Poa hylobates Bor
- Poa hypsinephes Veldkamp
- Poa ibarii Phil.
- Poa iberica Fisch., C.A.Mey. & Avé-Lall.
- Poa iconia Azn.
- Poa igoshinae Tzvelev
- Poa imbecilla Biehler
- Poa imperialis Bor
- Poa inconspicua Veldkamp
- Poa induta Vickery
- Poa infirma Kunth
- Poa interior Rydb.
- Poa × intricata Wein
- Poa intrusa Edgar
- Poa iridifolia Hauman
- Poa irkutica Roshev.
- Poa janaensis Prob.
- Poa jansenii Veldkamp
- Poa jaunsarensis Bor
- Poa × jemtlandica (Almq.) K.Richt.
- Poa jeremiadis Veldkamp
- Poa jubata A.Kern.
- Poa jugicola D.I.Morris
- Poa × jurassica Chrtek & V.Jirásek
- Poa kabalanica Prob.
- Poa kamczatensis Prob.
- Poa keckii Soreng
- Poa kelloggii Vasey
- Poa kenteica N.R.Ivanov
- Poa kerguelensis (Hook.f.) Steud.
- Poa keysseri Pilg.
- Poa khasiana Stapf
- Poa khokhrjakovii Prob.
- Poa kilimanjarica (Hedberg) Markgr.-Dann.
- Poa kirkii Buchanan
- Poa klokovii Tzvelev
- Poa koelzii Bor
- Poa koksuensis Golosk.
- Poa kolymensis Tzvelev
- Poa korshinskyi Tzvelev
- Poa krasnoborovii Stepanov
- Poa kronokensis Prob.
- Poa krylovii Reverd.
- Poa kuborensis Veldkamp
- Poa kulikovii Tzvelev
- Poa kurdistanica Chrtek & Hadac
- Poa kurtzii R.E.Fr.
- Poa kurynica Prob.
- Poa labillardierei Steud.
- Poa lachenensis Noltie
- Poa laegaardiana Soreng & P.M.Peterson
- Poa laetevirens R.E.Fr.
- Poa lamii Jansen
- Poa lanata Scribn. & Merr.
- Poa langtangensis Melderis
- Poa languidior Hitchc.
- Poa lanigera Nees
- Poa lanuginosa Poir.
- Poa lavrenkoi Kuczerov
- Poa laxa Haenke
- Poa laxiflora Buckley
- Poa lebedevae Usupbaev
- Poa legionensis (Laínz) Fern.Casas & M.Laínz
- Poa lehoueroui Dobignard & Portal
- Poa leibergii Scribn.
- Poa lepidula (Nees & Meyen) Soreng & L.J.Gillespie
- Poa leptalea Veldkamp
- Poa leptoclada Hochst. ex A.Rich.
- Poa leptocoma Trin.
- Poa lettermanii Vasey
- Poa levitskyi Nosov
- Poa lhasaensis Bor
- Poa ligularis Nees ex Steud.
- Poa ligulata Boiss.
- Poa lilloi Hack.
- Poa × limosa Scribn. & T.A.Williams
- Poa lindebergii Tzvelev
- Poa lindsayi Hook.f.
- Poa linearifolia Refulio
- Poa lipskyi Roshev.
- Poa litorosa Cheeseman
- Poa longifolia Trin.
- Poa longii Noltie
- Poa longiramea Hitchc.
- Poa × longriensis Prob. & Barkalov
- Poa lowanensis N.G.Walsh
- Poa lunata Chase
- Poa macrantha Vasey
- Poa macroanthera D.F.Cui
- Poa macrocalyx Trautv. & C.A.Mey.
- Poa macusaniensis (E.H.L.Krause) Refulio
- Poa madecassa A.Camus
- Poa × magadanensis Prob.
- Poa magadanica Kuvaev
- Poa magellensis F.Conti & Bartolucci
- Poa maia Edgar
- Poa mairei Hack.
- Poa maniototo Petrie
- Poa mannii Munro ex Hillebr.
- Poa mansfieldii Otting & B.L.Wilson
- Poa marcida Hitchc.
- Poa margilicola Bernátová & Májovský
- Poa markgrafii H.Hartmann
- Poa maroccana Nannf.
- Poa marshallii Tovar
- Poa masenderana Freyn & Sint.
- Poa matris-occidentalis P.M.Peterson & Soreng
- Poa matsumurae Hack.
- Poa matthewsii Petrie
- Poa megalantha (Parodi) Herter
- Poa meionectes Vickery
- Poa menachensis Schweinf.
- Poa mendocina Nicora & F.A.Roig
- Poa millii Soreng, Cabi & L.J.Gillespie
- Poa minimiflora Stapf
- Poa minor Gaudin
- Poa mireniana N.G.Walsh & K.L.McDougall
- Poa moabitica Bor
- Poa molinerii Balb.
- Poa mollis Vickery
- Poa morrisii Vickery
- Poa mucuchachensis Luces
- Poa muktinathensis Rajbh.
- Poa mulalensis Kunth
- Poa mulleri Swallen
- Poa multinodis Chase
- Poa × multnomae Piper
- Poa muricata Veldkamp
- Poa mustangensis Rajbh.
- Poa myriantha Hack.
- Poa nankoensis Ohwi
- Poa × nannfeldtii (H.Scholz ex Val.N.Tikhom.) Nosov
- Poa napensis Beetle
- Poa navashinii Nosov
- Poa × nematophylla Rydb.
- Poa nemoraliformis Roshev.
- Poa nemoralis L.
- Poa neosachalinensis Prob.
- Poa nepalensis (Wall. ex Griseb.) Duthie
- Poa nephelochloides (Roshev.) Soreng, Cabi & L.J.Gillespie
- Poa nervosa (Hook.) Vasey
- Poa nitidespiculata Bor
- Poa nivicola Ridl.
- Poa × nobilis Skalinska
- Poa novae-zelandiae Hack.
- Poa novarae Reichardt
- Poa nubensis Giussani, Fern.Pepi & Morrone
- Poa nubigena Keng f. ex L.Liu
- Poa nyaradyana Nannf.
- Poa obvallata Steud.
- Poa occidentalis (Vasey) Vasey
- Poa olajensis Prob.
- Poa olonovae Tzvelev
- Poa opinata Veldkamp
- Poa orba N.G.Walsh
- Poa orientisibirica Olonova
- Poa orizabensis Hitchc.
- Poa orthoclada N.G.Walsh
- Poa orthophylla Pilg.
- Poa paczoskii Tzvelev
- Poa pagophila Bor
- Poa palmeri Soreng & P.M.Peterson
- Poa paludigena Fernald & Wiegand
- Poa palustris L.
- Poa pannonica A.Kern.
- Poa paposana Phil.
- Poa papuana Stapf
- Poa parva Veldkamp
- Poa parvifolia Refulio
- Poa pattersonii Vasey
- Poa pauciflora Roem. & Schult.
- Poa paucispicula Scribn. & Merr.
- Poa × pawlowskii V.Jirásek
- Poa pearsonii Reeder
- Poa pedersenii Nicora
- Poa pentapolitana H.Scholz
- Poa perconcinna J.R.Edm.
- Poa perennis Keng ex Keng f.
- Poa perligulata Pilg.
- Poa perrieri A.Camus
- Poa persica Trin.
- Poa petrophila Vickery
- Poa petrosa Swallen
- Poa pfisteri Soreng
- Poa phillipsiana Vickery
- Poa physoclina N.G.Walsh
- Poa pilata Chase
- Poa pilcomayensis Hack.
- Poa pitardiana H.Scholz
- Poa planifolia Kuntze
- Poa platyantha Kom.
- Poa plicata Hack.
- Poa poiformis (Labill.) Druce
- Poa polycolea Stapf
- Poa polyneura Bor
- Poa × poppelwellii Petrie
- Poa populetorum Prob.
- Poa porphyroclados Nees
- Poa pratensis L.
- Poa prichardii Rendle
- Poa primae Tzvelev
- Poa pringlei Scribn.
- Poa pseudamoena Bor
- Poa pseudoabbreviata Roshev.
- Poa pseudoattenuata Prob.
- Poa pseudobulbosa Bor
- Poa pseudoradula Prob.
- Poa pseudoschimperiana Chiov.
- Poa pulviniformis (Veldkamp) Veldkamp
- Poa pumila Host
- Poa pumilio Hochst.
- Poa pusilla Berggr.
- Poa pygmaea Buchanan
- Poa qinghaiensis Soreng & G.H.Zhu
- Poa quadrata Veldkamp
- Poa radula Franch. & Sav.
- Poa raduliformis Prob.
- Poa ragonesei Nicora
- Poa rajbhandarii Noltie
- Poa ramifera Soreng & P.M.Peterson
- Poa ramoniana Soreng & Sylvester
- Poa ramosissima Hook.f.
- Poa rauhii (Swallen & Tovar) Refulio
- Poa reclinata (Swallen) Soreng & P.M.Peterson
- Poa reflexa Vasey & Scribn.
- Poa rehmannii (Asch. & Graebn.) K.Richt.
- Poa reitzii Swallen
- Poa remota Forselles
- Poa resinulosa Nees ex Steud.
- Poa rhadina Bor
- Poa rhizomata Hitchc.
- Poa rigidula Veldkamp
- Poa riphaea (Asch. & Graebn.) Fritsch
- Poa rodwayi Vickery
- Poa royleana Nees ex Steud.
- Poa ruprechtii Peyr.
- Poa ruwenzoriensis Robyns & Tournay
- Poa × sachalinensis (Koidz.) Honda
- Poa saksonovii Tzvelev
- Poa salinostepposa Prob.
- Poa sallacustris N.G.Walsh
- Poa saltuensis Fernald & Wiegand
- Poa sanchez-vegae Soreng & P.M.Peterson
- Poa sandvicensis (Reichardt) Hitchc.
- Poa × sanionis Asch. & Graebn.
- Poa scaberula Hook.f.
- Poa scabrivaginata Tovar
- Poa schimperiana Hochst. ex A.Rich.
- Poa schistacea Edgar & Connor
- Poa schizantha Parodi
- Poa schmidtiana Prob. & Barkalov
- Poa schoenoides Phil.
- Poa × sclerocalamos Facchini ex Ambrosi
- Poa secunda J.Presl
- Poa sejuncta Bernátová & Májovský & Obuch
- Poa seleri Pilg.
- Poa sellovii Nees
- Poa senex Edgar
- Poa serpana Refulio
- Poa setulosa Bor
- Poa shumushuensis Ohwi
- Poa sibirica Roshev.
- Poa sichotensis Prob.
- Poa sieberiana Spreng.
- Poa sierrae J.T.Howell
- Poa sikkimensis (Stapf) Bor
- Poa simensis Hochst. ex A.Rich.
- Poa sinaica Steud.
- Poa sintenisii H.Lindb.
- Poa siphonoglossa Hack.
- Poa skvortzovii Prob.
- Poa smirnowii Roshev.
- Poa spania Edgar & Molloy
- Poa speluncarum J.R.Edm.
- Poa sphondylodes Trin.
- Poa spiciformis (Steud.) Hauman & Parodi
- Poa spicigera Tovar
- Poa stapfiana Bor
- Poa stebbinsii Soreng
- Poa stellaris Veldkamp
- Poa stenantha Trin.
- Poa sterilis M.Bieb.
- Poa stewartiana Bor
- Poa stiriaca Fritsch & Hayek
- Poa strictiramea Hitchc.
- Poa stuckertii (Hack.) Parodi
- Poa suavis Veldkamp
- Poa subinsignis Prob.
- Poa sublanata Reverd.
- Poa sublimis Edgar
- Poa subspicata (J.Presl) Kunth
- Poa subvestita (Hack.) Edgar
- Poa sudicola Edgar
- Poa sugawarae Ohwi
- Poa suksdorfii (Beal) Piper
- Poa sunbisinii Soreng & G.H.Zhu
- Poa superlanata Prob.
- Poa supina Schrad.
- Poa swallenii Refulio
- Poa sylvestris A.Gray
- Poa szechuensis Rendle
- Poa takasagomontana Ohwi
- Poa talamancae R.W.Pohl
- Poa talikensis Prob. & Barkalov
- Poa tanfiljewii Roshev.
- Poa tangii Hitchc.
- Poa × taurica H.N.Pojark.
- Poa × tayacajaensis Soreng & Sylvester
- Poa telata Veldkamp
- Poa tenera F.Muell. ex Hook.f.
- Poa tenerrima Scribn.
- Poa tenkensis Prob.
- Poa tennantiana Petrie
- Poa tenuicula Ohwi
- Poa teretifolia Renvoize
- Poa thessala Boiss. & Orph.
- Poa thomasii Refulio
- Poa tianschanica (Regel) Hack. ex O.Fedtsch.
- Poa timoleontis Heldr. ex Boiss.
- Poa tolmatchewii Roshev.
- Poa tonsa Edgar
- Poa tovarii Soreng
- Poa trachyantha Hack.
- Poa trachyphylla Pilg.
- Poa tracyi Vasey
- Poa trichophylla Boiss.
- Poa tricolor Nees ex Steud.
- Poa trinervis (Hack.) C.Monod ex P.Royen
- Poa triodioides (Trin.) Zotov
- Poa trivialiformis Kom.
- Poa trivialis L.
- Poa trollii (Pilg.) Refulio
- Poa tuberifera Faurie ex Hack.
- Poa tucumana Parodi
- Poa tuonnachensis Prob. & Barkalov
- Poa turgensis Prob.
- Poa tuvinensis Prob.
- Poa tzvelevii Prob.
- Poa × tzyrenovae Prob.
- Poa ullungdoensis I.C.Chung
- Poa umbricola Vickery
- Poa umbrosa Trin.
- Poa unilateralis Scribn. ex Vasey
- Poa unispiculata Davidse, Soreng & P.M.Peterson
- Poa ursina Velen.
- Poa urssulensis Trin.
- Poa urubambensis Sylvester & Soreng
- Poa uruguayensis Parodi
- Poa ussuriensis Roshev.
- Poa uzonica Prob.
- Poa vaginata Pamp.
- Poa verae Prob.
- Poa veresczaginii Tzvelev
- Poa versicolor Besser
- Poa vorobievii Prob.
- Poa vvedenskyi Drobow
- Poa wallowensis Soreng
- Poa wardiana Bor
- Poa wendtii Soreng & P.M.Peterson
- Poa wheeleri Vasey
- Poa wilhelminae Veldkamp
- Poa × wippraensis Wein
- Poa wisselii Jansen
- Poa wolfii Scribn.
- Poa xenica Edgar & Connor
- Poa xingkaiensis Y.X.Ma
- Poa yaganica Speg.
- Poa yatsugatakensis Honda
- Poa zhirmunskii Prob.
- Poa zhongdianensis L.Liu
