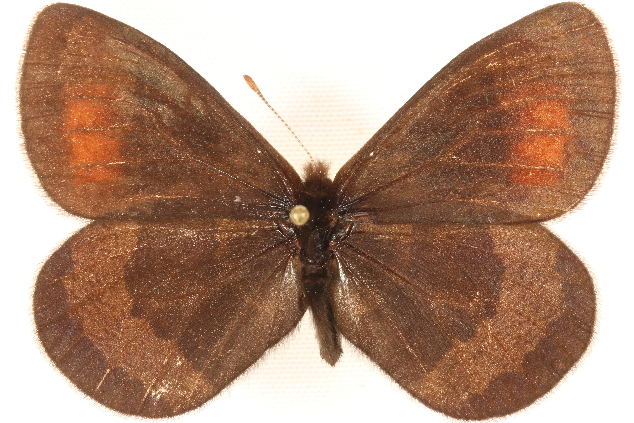

Scientific classification
- Domain: Eukaryota
- Kingdom: Animalia
- Phylum: Arthropoda
- Class: Insecta
- Order: Lepidoptera
- Family: Nymphalidae
- Genus: Erebia
- Species: E. fasciata

Binomial name
- Erebia fasciata Butler, 1868

Subspecies
- Three, see text

Synonyms
- Erebia suffusa Warren, 1936; Erebia fasciata var. semo Grum-Grshimailo, 1899

= Erebia fasciata =

Banded alpine

Species of butterfly

Erebia fasciata, the banded alpine, is a member of the subfamily Satyrinae of family Nymphalidae. It is found from central Siberia, through Alaska, Yukon, and mainland Northwest Territories and Nunavut to Hudson Bay. It also occurs on Banks Island and Victoria Island.

The wingspan is 38–53 mm.

== Description in Seitz ==
E. fasciata Btl: Size and shape as in glacialis, ground-colour sombre black-brown with a russet- brown incomplete distal band which is traversed by the veins and has no ocelli. On the hindwing there is a grey-brownish submarginal band extending from the costal to the hindmargin and being of nearly even width The russet-brown band is lighter and more prominent on the underside of the forewing, the costal margin and part of the outer margin being thinly dusted with grey. The hindwing beneath more or less dusted with grey at the base, the externally somewhat dentate central area being dark brown, the submarginal band pale ashy grey and the distal area of the same colour as the central area. The female is lighter throughout, the forewing having a brownish tint and a somewhat longer and broader submarginal band on the hindwing the basal area and the submarginal band whitish grey, the central area and distal margin grey-brown. - From East Siberia: at Pokrofka and the mouth of the Jenisei, in June.

Adults are on wing from May to late July depending on location.

The larvae feed on Carex species.

== Subspecies ==
- Erebia fasciata faciata (Nunavut to central Alaska)
- Erebia fasciata semo Grum-Grshimailo, 1899 (northern Siberia, western Chukot Peninsula, Far East)
- Erebia fasciata avinoffi Holland, 1930 (north-western Alaska, eastern Russia)

== Similar species ==
- Red-disked alpine (E. discoidalis)
