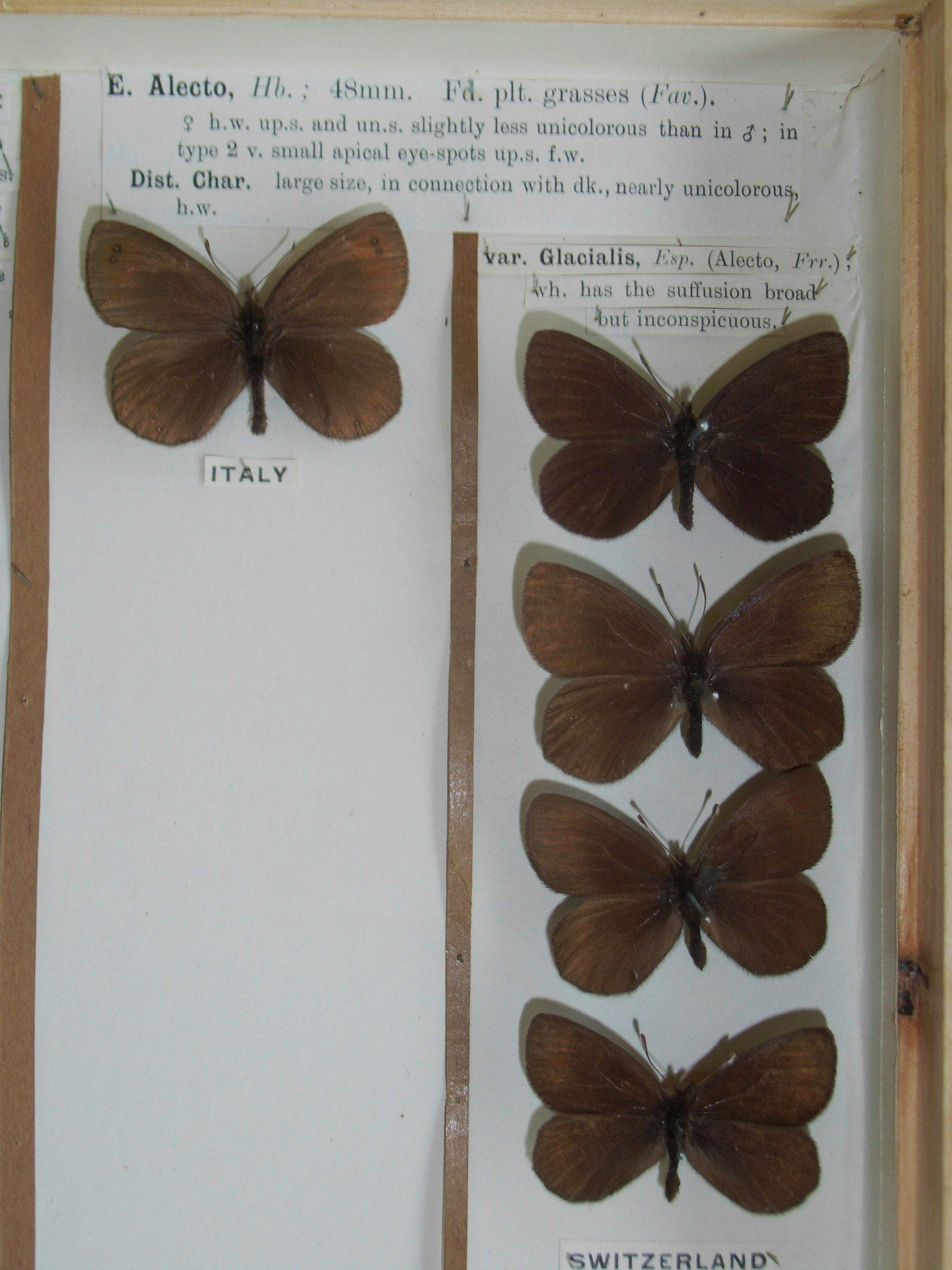
- Museum specimens. E. alecto Hübner, 1800 is a junior synonym of E. pluto de Prunner, 1798. Wheeler collection.Ulster Museum.

Scientific classification
- Domain: Eukaryota
- Kingdom: Animalia
- Phylum: Arthropoda
- Class: Insecta
- Order: Lepidoptera
- Family: Nymphalidae
- Genus: Erebia
- Species: E. pluto

Binomial name
- Erebia pluto (de Prunner, 1798)

Synonyms
- Erebia alecto; Erebia glacialis; Papilio persephone

= Sooty ringlet =

Species of butterfly

The sooty ringlet (Erebia pluto) is a member of the subfamily Satyrinae of family Nymphalidae. It is a high-altitude butterfly found in the Alps and Apennine Mountains on heights between 1,900 and 3,000 meters (6,200 and 9,800 ft) in Austria, Germany, France, Switzerland, Italy and Slovenia.

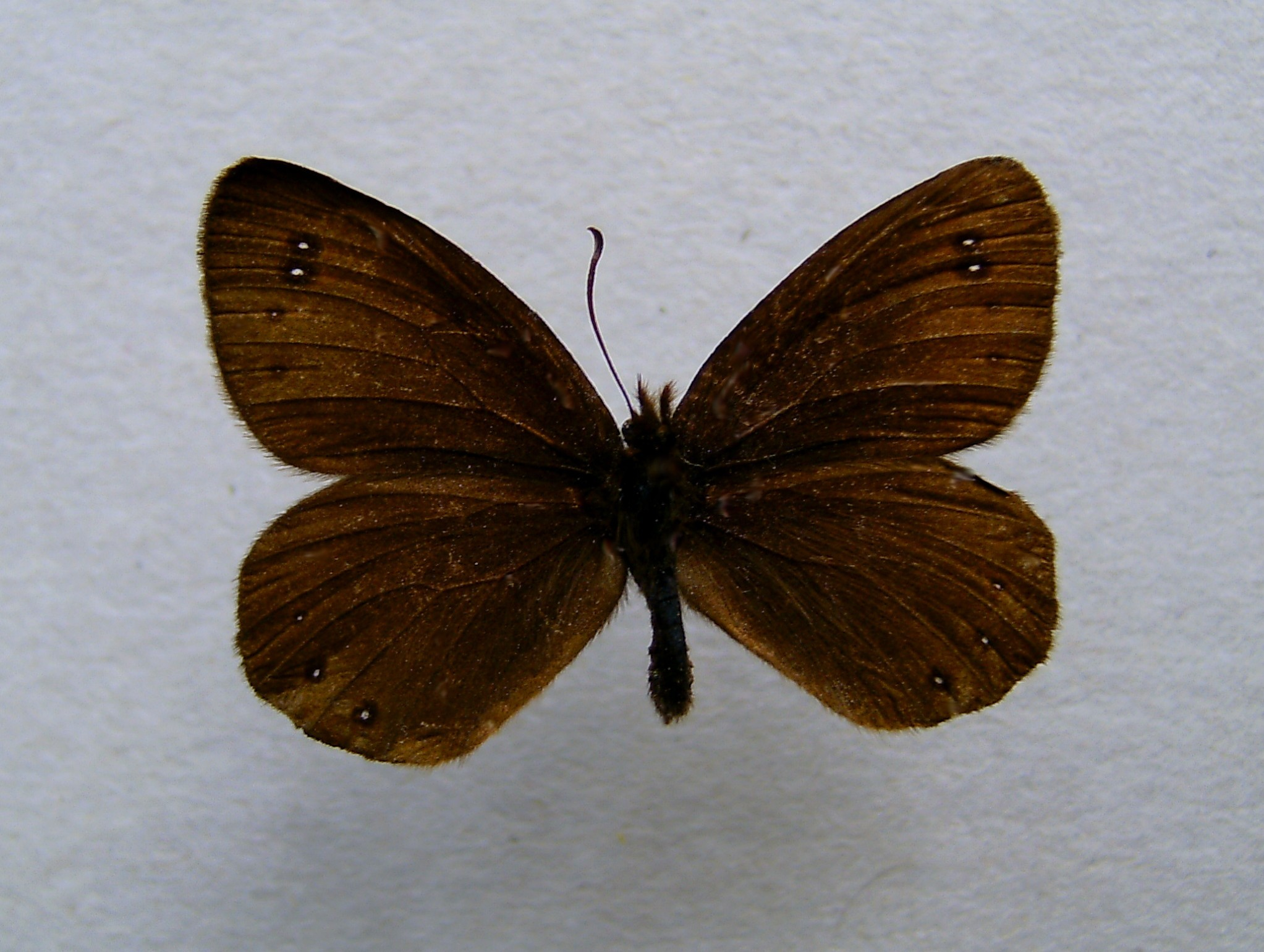

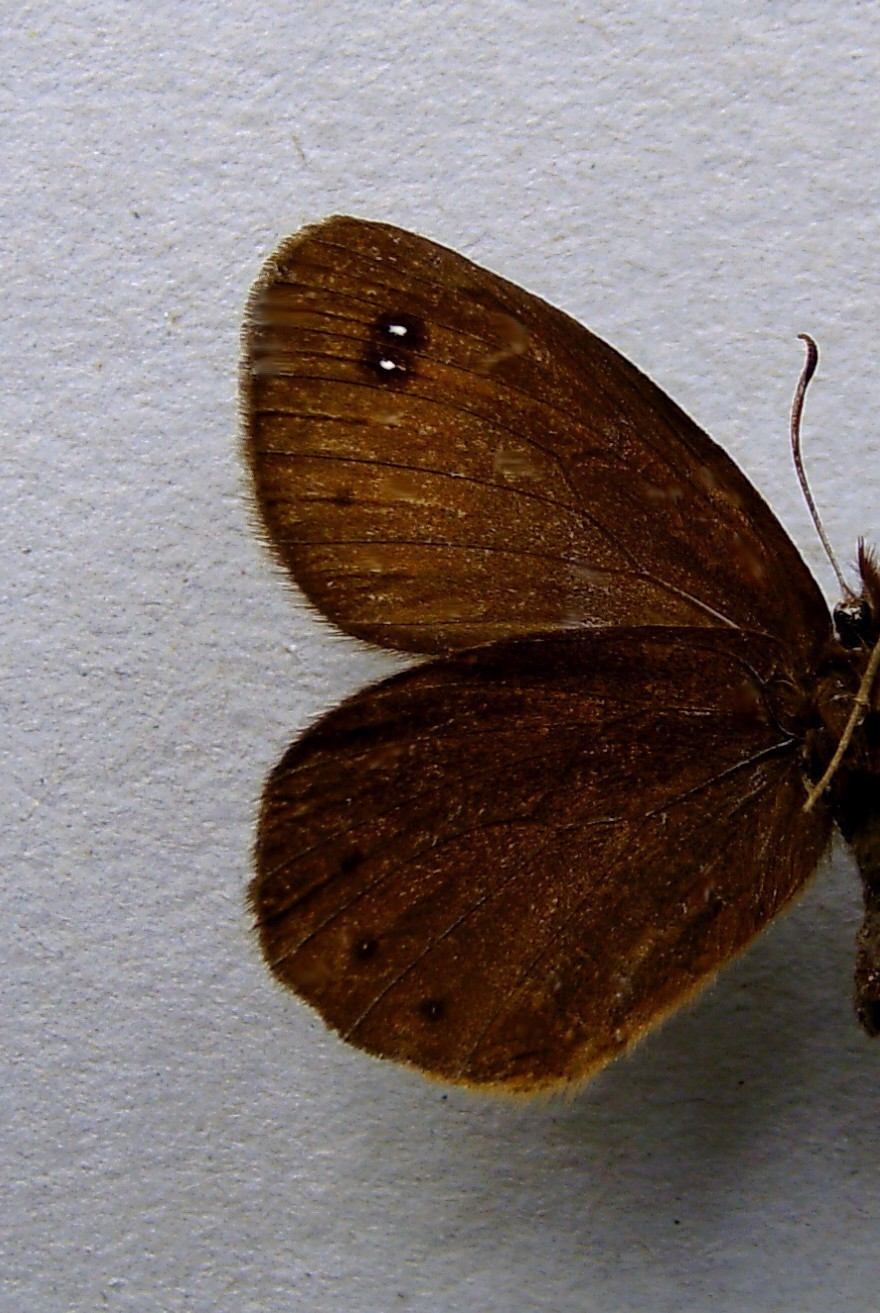
Underside

The wingspan is 32–40 mm (1.3–1.6 in).

== Description in Seitz ==
E. glacialis Esp. (= alecto Frr.) (37 b). Upperside of both wings sombre black-brown, with an obsolescent red-brown band on the forewing which often hardly contrasts with the ground-colour. The hindwing is either simply blackish brown, or there is a faint red-brown tint in the place of the distal band. The forewing is beneath dark russet in the centre, being a little lighter in the female; the hindwing uniformly dark black-brown in the male, and blackish grey in the female, a little lighter distally. — Distributed over the whole Alps, but occurring above the tree line, in July and August, on localities covered with boulders. — In alecto Hbn. (= persephone Esp., nicholli Oberth.) (37b) both sexes have before the apex of the forewing two white-centred ocelli, which are also visible beneath. On the hindwing, too, there are 2-4 whitecentred ocelli, which are generally but partly present beneath or may be entirely absent. Otherwise like the form glacialis. More an insect of the northern and eastern Limestone Alps, occurring but sporadically and mostly in small numbers of individuals. — pluto Esp. (= tisiphone Esp., duponcheli Oberth.) (37 c) has the upper- and underside uniformly black, only in the female there being occasionally a faint reddish brown tint on the upperside of the forewing. From the Abruzzi and the highest Alps.

Adults are on wing from June to August. There is one generation per year.

The larvae mainly feed on Festuca, Poa annua and Poa minor.
