= Thabana Ntlenyana =

Highest mountain in Lesotho

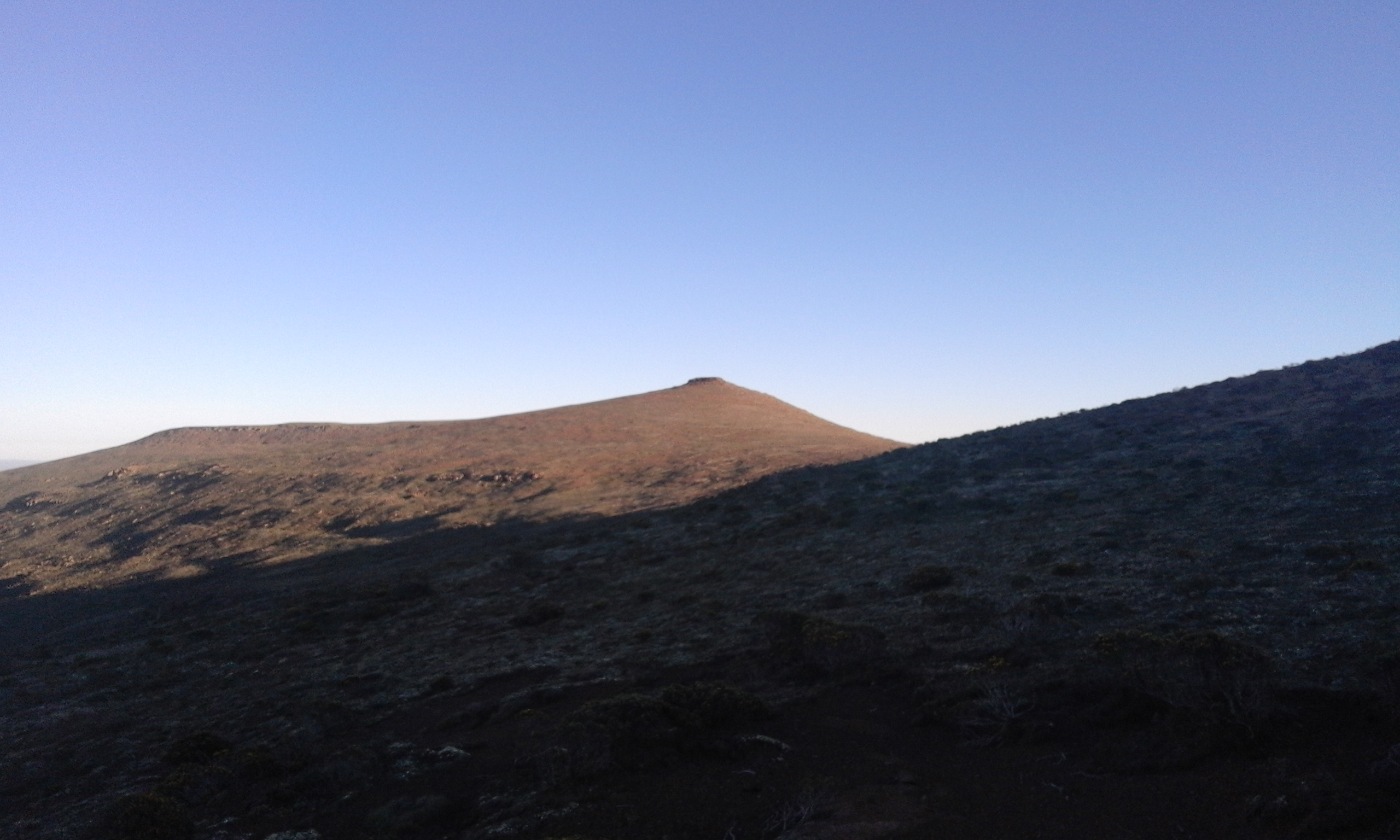

Highest point
- Elevation: 3,482 m (11,424 ft)
- Prominence: 2,392 m (7,848 ft)
- Isolation: 3,003 km (1,866 mi) to Mount Loolmalasin
- Listing: Country high point Ultra; Ribu; World's most isolated peaks 11th
- Coordinates: 29°28′S 29°16′E

Geography
- Location within Lesotho
- Location: Lesotho
- Parent range: Maloti

Climbing
- Easiest route: Hike

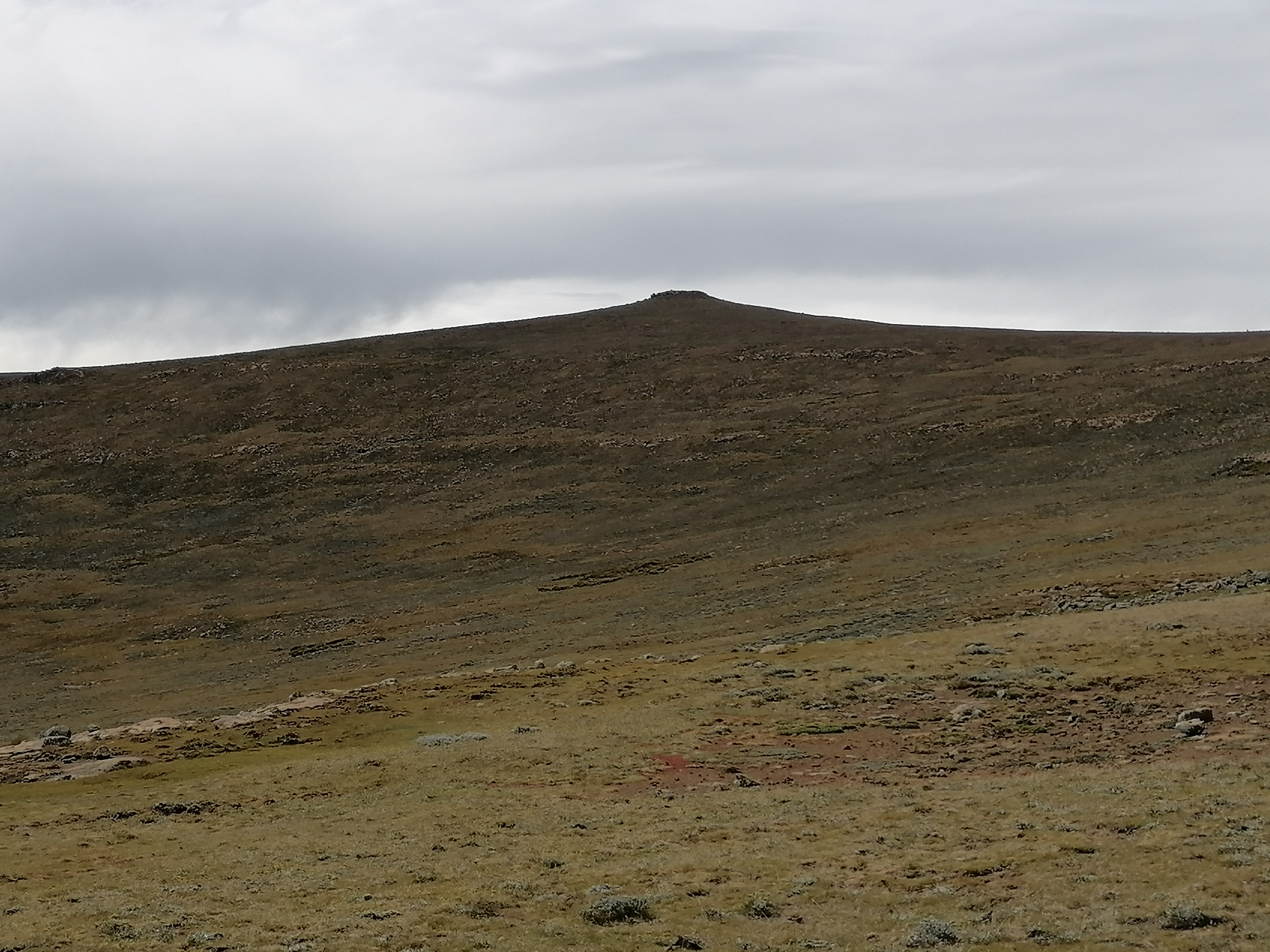
Approaching the summit of Thabana Ntlenyana

Thabana Ntlenyana (tah-BAH-nə in-TLAY-nyə-nə) is the highest mountain in southern Africa. It stands 3,482 metres (11,424 ft) tall within the Maloti Mountains that crest Lesotho. The peak's name means "beautiful little mountain" in the Sesotho language, from thaba (mountain), the diminutive -na, ntle (beautiful), and yana (little one). Thabana Ntlenyana is ranked 11th in the world by topographic isolation.

== Geography ==
Thabana Ntlenyana is situated on the Mohlesi ridge, north of the treacherous Sani Pass. The peak is climbed as part of a "Grand Traverse" of the Maloti, which follows a large system of peaks within the Maloti (Maluti) and the broader Drakensberg. Thabana Ntlenyana, like the broader highlands around it, is made of amygdaloidal flood basalt that formed during the Upper Triassic and Lower Jurassic epochs. Nearby the mountain are the headwaters of the Orange River, which runs approximately 1,300 kilometres (810 mi) to the west before draining into the Atlantic Ocean. Together with its main tributary, the Vaal River, the Orange River's catchment spans around 855,000 square kilometres (330,000 mi^{2}) of land across Southern Africa.

== Ecology ==
The high-elevation treeless areas in the Drakensberg like Thabana Ntlenyana are categorized by the World Wide Fund for Nature as part of the Drakensberg alti-montane grasslands and woodlands ecoregion. This ecoregion is characterized by high elevation and high rainfall, but also by cooler temperatures than more equatorial montane areas. Rainfall comes in summer, often exceeding 1,000 millimetres (39 in) per year. Snowfall can occur in winter. Temperature varies from −8 °C (18 °F) to 32 °C (90 °F), with an average of 13 °C (55 °F).

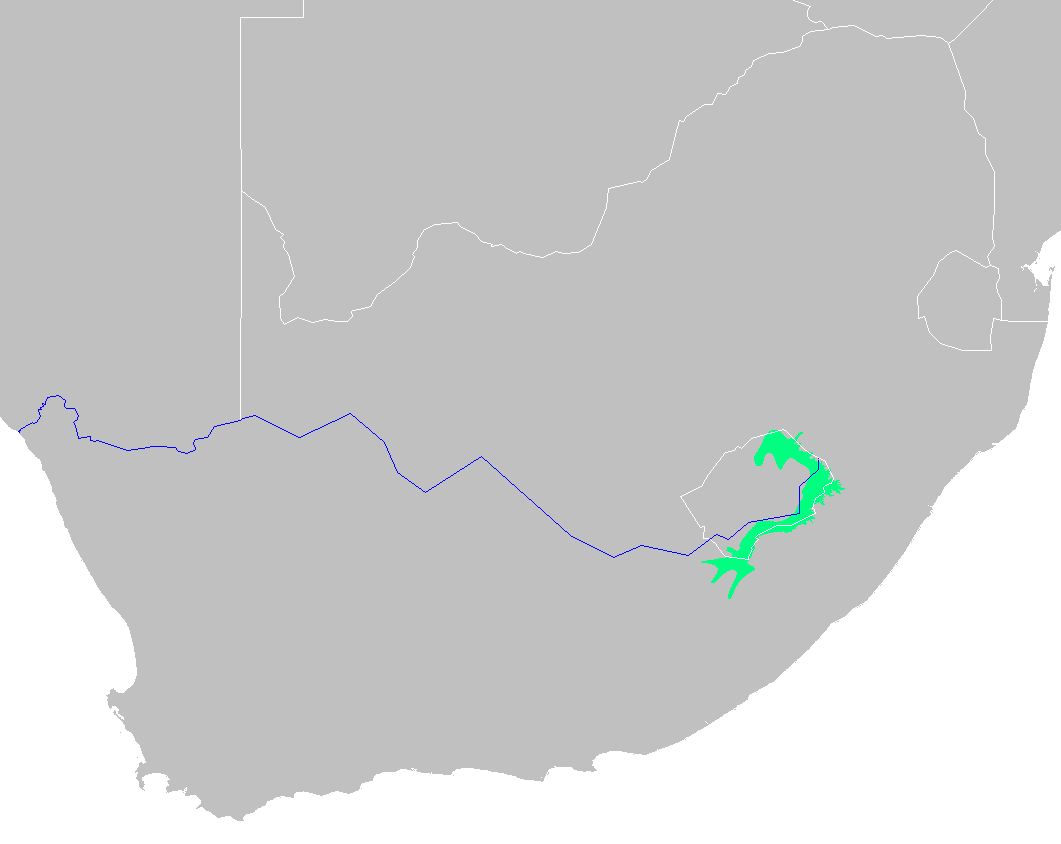
The Drakensberg alti-montane grasslands and woodlands ecoregion, in green (WWF, 2001)

Vegetation in the Maloti is known to vary with the surface geomorphic features beneath it, such as the soil's grain size, carbon content, and depth. Flora communities are composed largely of tussock grasses and ericoid shrubs. Some of the most prevalent grass, sedge, and ericoid species are Merxmuellera disticha, M. drakensbergensis, Poa banana, Carex clavata, and Scirpus falsus.

The unique faunal communities of the Drakensberg grasslands have not yet been fully described by the scientific community. However, a 2001 study surveyed avian populations on Thabana Ntlenyana in particular. It found relatively low species diversity (23 spp.), with about a dozen living at the summit and more living in the peak's foothills. The majority of breeding pairs recorded were insectivores, with the remaining mostly being granivores. The most dominant species across Thabana Ntlenyana was the Cape bunting (Emberiza capensis). At the summit, the African stonechat (Saxicola torquata), sickle-winged chat (Cercomela sinuata), and African pipit (Anthus cinnamomeus) dominated, while the lower foothills were home to more of the sentinel rock thrush (Monticola explorator), Drakensberg siskin (Pseudochlor. symonsi), and Drakensberg rockjumper (Chaetops aurant.).

== Access ==
The peak is often climbed from Sani Top Chalet or from Vergelegen Nature Reserve. The first recorded ascent by Western-tradition mountaineers was achieved in March 1951 by a South African-English team of leader Desmond Watkins, surveyors Barry Anderson and Roy Goodwin, mountaineer C. W. Jorgensen, and least three other assistants, described by Jorgensen only as "cooks, bottlewashers and scarecrows."

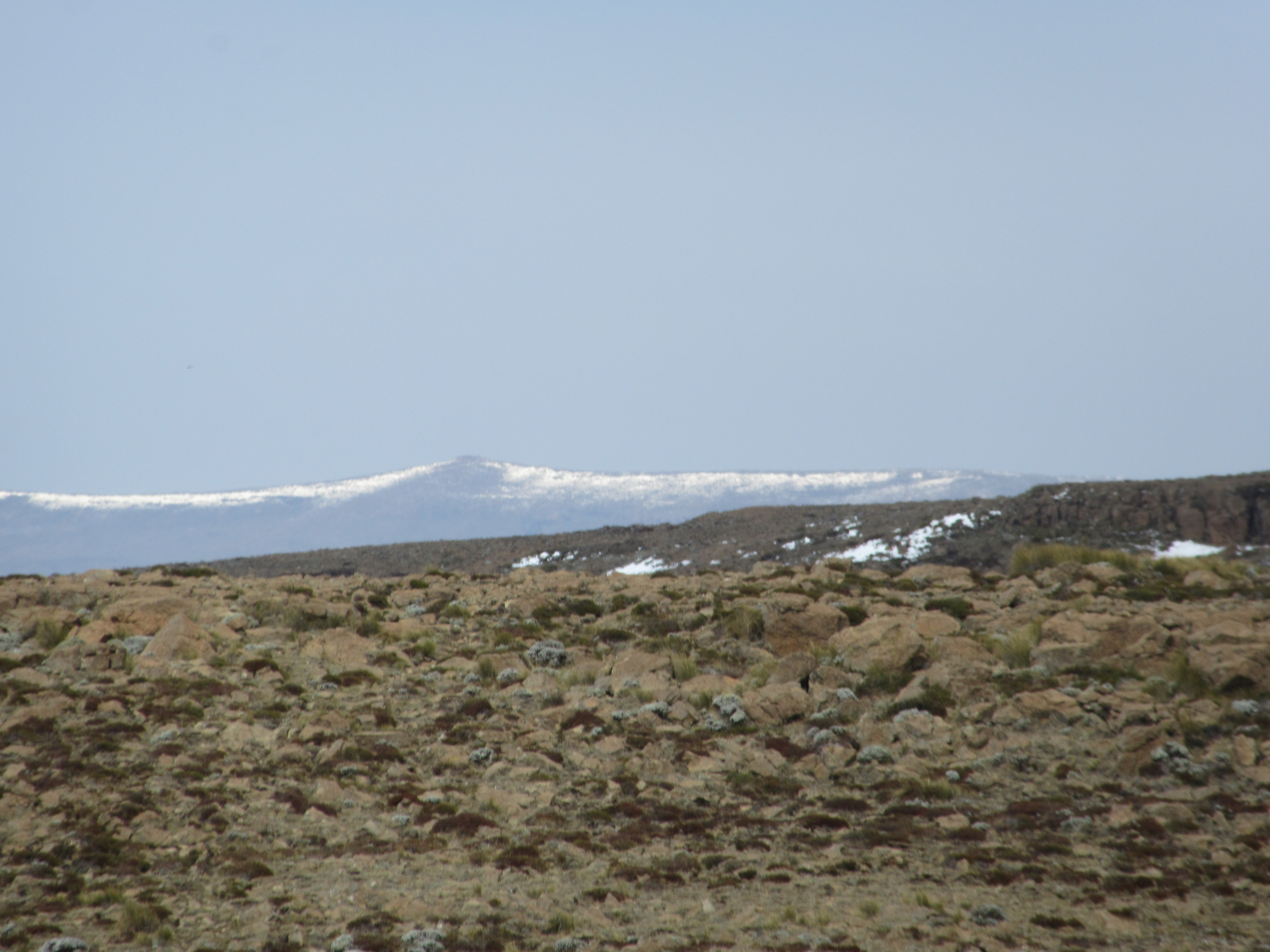
Thabana Ntlenyana as seen from the Giants Castle Ridge

== Resources ==
- Fresh Water Ecoregions of the World
