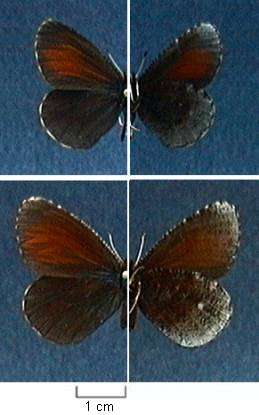

Scientific classification
- Kingdom: Animalia
- Phylum: Arthropoda
- Clade: Pancrustacea
- Class: Insecta
- Order: Lepidoptera
- Family: Nymphalidae
- Genus: Erebia
- Species: E. discoidalis

Binomial name
- Erebia discoidalis W. Kirby, 1837

Subspecies
- Four, see text

Synonyms
- Erebia lena Christoph, 1889

= Erebia discoidalis =

Species of butterfly

Erebia discoidalis, the red-disked alpine, is a member of the subfamily Satyrinae of family Nymphalidae. It is found in North America from eastern Quebec, through northern Ontario (south to Sudbury), and the northern Prairies to northern British Columbia, the Northwest Territories, Yukon, and Alaska. It reaches just into the northern U.S. between Michigan and Montana, and also occurs in Asia, where it has been recorded from the Chukot Peninsula to the eastern Sayan Mountains and Amur. The habitat consists of large, open, grassy bogs and other areas with acidic soils.

The wingspan is 35–44 mm. In Seitz it is described thus - E. discoidalis Krb. (= lena Christ.) (37 h). The forewing narrow, with the apex rounded, the costal margin being brownish grey and striated with whitish grey and brown. The dull brown disc broadly bordered with dark chocolate anteriorly and posteriorly, this border being narrow on the distal side, the dark apex of the wing feebly dusted with grey. The forewing beneath is marked as above, the border of the brown central area is somewhat broader, the apex and distal margin densely dusted with bluish grey. The hindwing beneath dark brown from the base to the middle and thinly dusted with whitish grey, the outer half being blue-grey with small dark brown striae. At the apex of the cell there is an oval whitish greyspot and at the costal margin 2—3 somewhat smaller ones. — Central and Eastern Siberia (Amurland); besides in Arctic America. Graeser found the species to be very rare at Podrofka in June; from the worn condition of the specimens obtained he concludes that the insect is possibly more plentiful earlier in the year.

Adults are on wing from May to late July depending on location.

The larvae feed on Eriophorum species.

== Subspecies ==
- E. d. discoidalis
- E. d. lena Christoph, 1889 (tundra of northern Siberia, Chukot Peninsula, Russian Far East)
- E. d. yablonoica Warren, 1931 (Transbaikalia, Amur)
- E. d. mcdunnoughi dos Passos, 1940 (Alaska)

== Similar species ==
- Banded alpine (E. fasciata)
