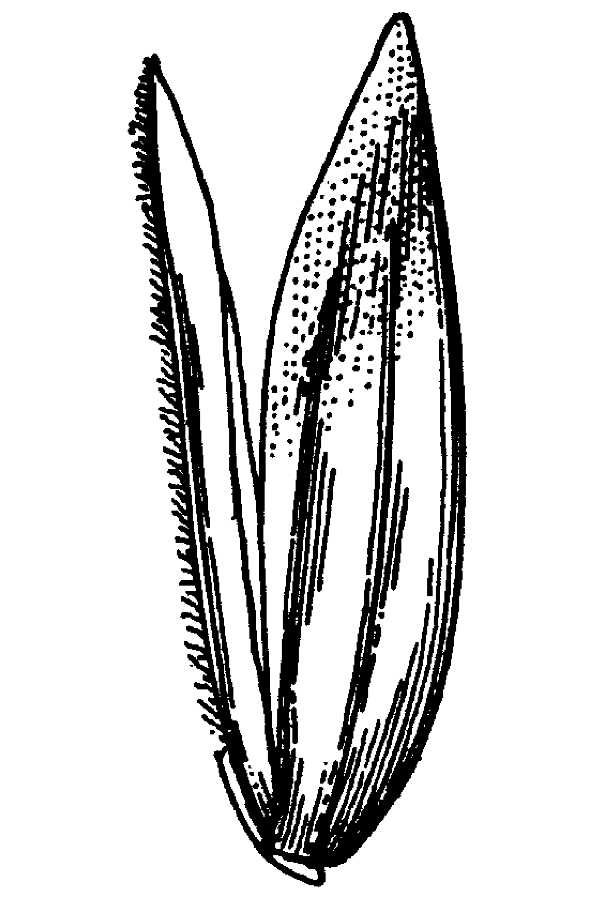

Conservation status
- Endangered (ESA)

Scientific classification
- Kingdom: Plantae
- Clade: Tracheophytes
- Clade: Angiosperms
- Clade: Monocots
- Clade: Commelinids
- Order: Poales
- Family: Poaceae
- Subfamily: Pooideae
- Genus: Poa
- Species: P. napensis

Binomial name
- Poa napensis Beetle

= Poa napensis =

Species of grass

Poa napensis is a rare species of grass known by the common name Napa bluegrass. It is endemic to Napa County, California, where it is known from only two occurrences near Calistoga. It grows in moist, mineral-rich soil around hot springs. The rare grass only occurs on private, unprotected land and depends on water from the hot springs; changes to the local water regime or any other aspects of its specific habitat type would affect the plant. This grass was federally listed as an endangered species in 1997, along with another rare local hot spring endemic, the Calistoga popcornflower (Plagiobothrys strictus).

This is a perennial grass forming dense clumps of somewhat waxy stems up to about a meter in maximum height. The inflorescence is an open array of thin branches bearing rough-haired, flattened, lance-shaped spikelets. The spikelets may be greenish to purple in color.

== Taxonomy ==
Poa napensis was scientifically described and named in 1946 by Alan Ackerman Beetle. It is classified in the Poa genus as part of the Poaceae family, the true grasses. The species has no botanical synonyms.
