= Poa costiniana =

Scientific classification
- Kingdom: Plantae
- Clade: Embryophytes
- Clade: Tracheophytes
- Clade: Angiosperms
- Clade: Monocots
- Clade: Commelinids
- Order: Poales
- Family: Poaceae
- Subfamily: Pooideae
- Genus: Poa
- Species: P. costiniana

Binomial name
- Poa costiniana Vickery

Species of grass

Poa costiniana, also known as bog snow-grass and prickly snow-grass, is a species of grass in the genus Poa. It is an tussock-forming alpine snow grass that is widespread in high-elevation environments, where it is especially common in damp habitats and may form dense, nearly pure swards. The species was discovered by Joyce Winifred Vickery.

== Description ==
Poa costiniana grows up to 80 cm (2 ft 7 in) high. It has leaf blades 0.3 to 1.75 mm (0.012 to 0.069 in) wide and 7 to 40 cm (3 to 16 in) long, mostly smooth, and rather rigid. The inflorescences are 5 to 20 cm (2 to 8 in) long. Flowering occurs in summer.

== Distribution ==
Poa costiniana is native to Northern Territory, South Australia, and Victoria. It is local to Mount Kosciuszko, with an average elevation of 2,340 metres (7,680 ft).

== See also ==
- List of Poa species
