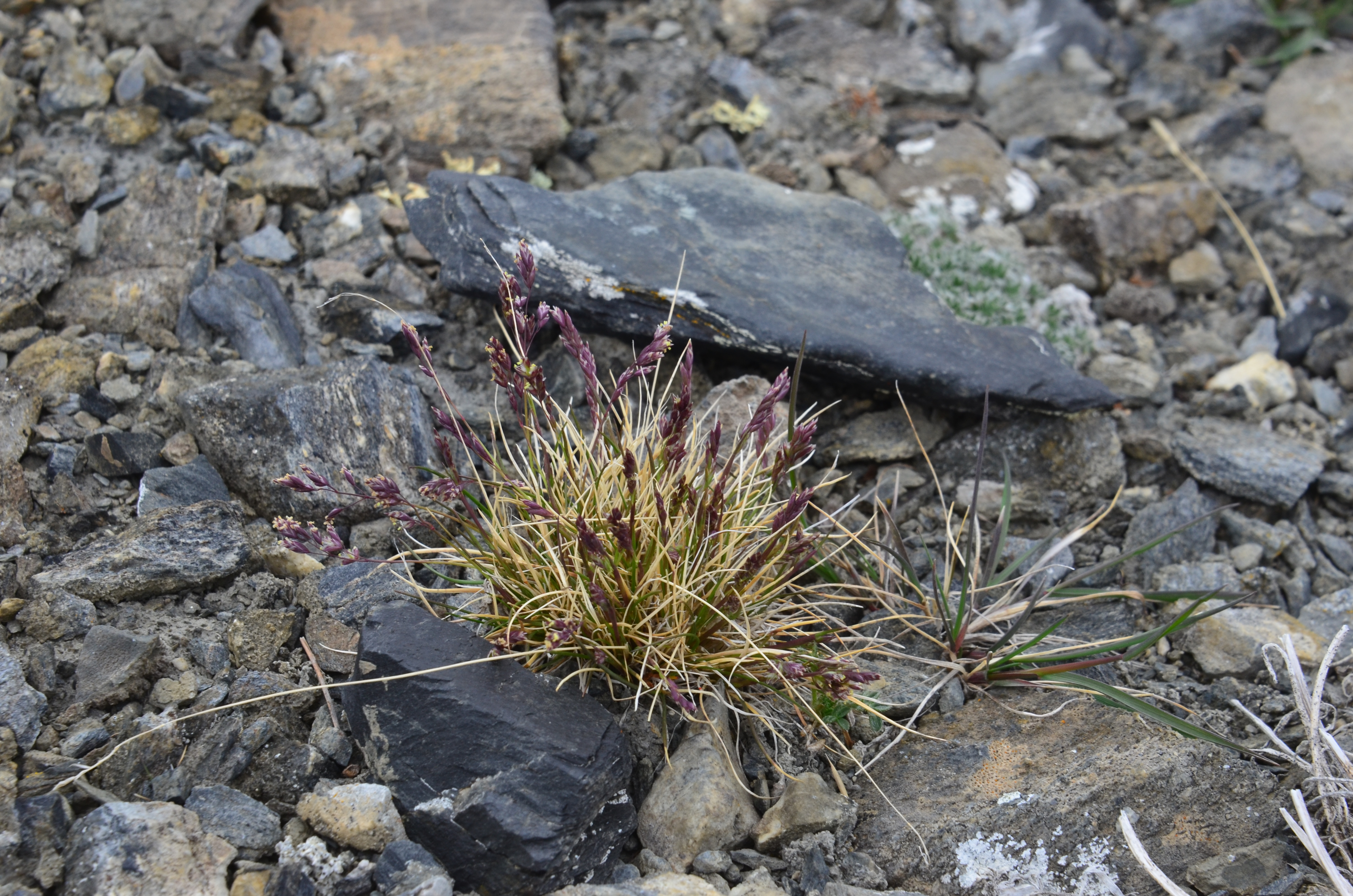

Scientific classification
- Kingdom: Plantae
- Clade: Tracheophytes
- Clade: Angiosperms
- Clade: Monocots
- Clade: Commelinids
- Order: Poales
- Family: Poaceae
- Subfamily: Pooideae
- Genus: Poa
- Species: P. abbreviata

Binomial name
- Poa abbreviata R.Br.

Synonyms
- Poa abbreviata var. jordalii (A.E.Porsild) B.Boivin; Poa abbreviata subsp. jordalii (A.E.Porsild) Hultén; Poa abbreviata var. marshii (Soreng) Tiehm; Poa abbreviata subsp. marshii Soreng; Poa jordalii A.E.Porsild

= Poa abbreviata =

Circumpolar species of North American grass

Poa abbreviata is a species of grass in the family Poaceae. It is widely distributed in alpine and circumpolar regions of North America such as Alaska, Yukon, Nunavut, Greenland, Oregon, California, Nevada, Utah, Colorado, Idaho etc. It blooms during the month of June.

== Subspecies ==
This species contains one subspecies: Poa abbreviata subsp. marshii. Poa abbreviata subsp. pattersoni is a synonym for Poa pattersonii.

=== Poa abbreviata subsp. marshii ===
Poa abbreviata subsp. marshii, also known as Marsh's blue grass, is found scattered across the interior of western North America on the Alpine peaks of the White Mountains, (California) Schell Creek Range (Nevada), southern Rocky Mountains (Idaho), Little belt Mountains (Montana), and the Big Horn Mountains (Wyoming).

== Description ==
Poa abbreviata is a small perennial grass of Arctic and alpine regions. It grows in dense tufts rather than spreading by rhizomes. Stems are short, usually 5–20 cm tall, and rise from basal shoots. Leaves are narrow (0.8–2 mm wide), often rolled inward, and end in a pointed tip. Ligules are short, 0.4–5.5 mm, and usually translucent.

The flower clusters (panicles) are compact, 1.5–5 cm long, with only a few branches and spikelets. Spikelets are small (4–6.5 mm), often purplish, and contain 2–5 florets. Glumes are lance‑shaped, keeled, and nearly equal in size to the lemmas. Lemmas are 3–4.6 mm long, thin, and usually hairy along the veins, while anthers are very small, 0.2–1.2 mm in length.

== Distribution ==
This species has a wide distribution range stretching the Alpine and circumpolar regions of North America. Regions include Alaska, Yukon, Nunavut, Greenland, Oregon, California, Nevada, Utah, Colorado, Wyoming, Idaho, Montana and Alberta.
