= Poa sintenisii =

Conservation status
- Least Concern (IUCN 3.1)

Scientific classification
- Kingdom: Plantae
- Clade: Tracheophytes
- Clade: Angiosperms
- Clade: Monocots
- Clade: Commelinids
- Order: Poales
- Family: Poaceae
- Subfamily: Pooideae
- Genus: Poa
- Species: P. sintenisii

Binomial name
- Poa sintenisii H.Lindb.

Synonyms
- Lindbergella sintenisii (H.Lindb.) Bor; Lindbergia sintenisii (H.Lindb.) Bor, nom. illeg.; Poa persica subsp. cypria Sam.

Genus of grasses

Poa sintenisii is a species of grass (family Poaceae) endemic to the island of Cyprus in the Mediterranean Sea. Under the synonym Lindbergella sintenisii, it was the only species in the monotypic genus Lindbergella.

== Taxonomy ==
The species was first described in 1942 by Harald Lindberg. In 1968, Norman Bor transferred it to his new genus Lindbergia, but this name had already been used, so in 1969, he published the replacement name Lindbergella.
