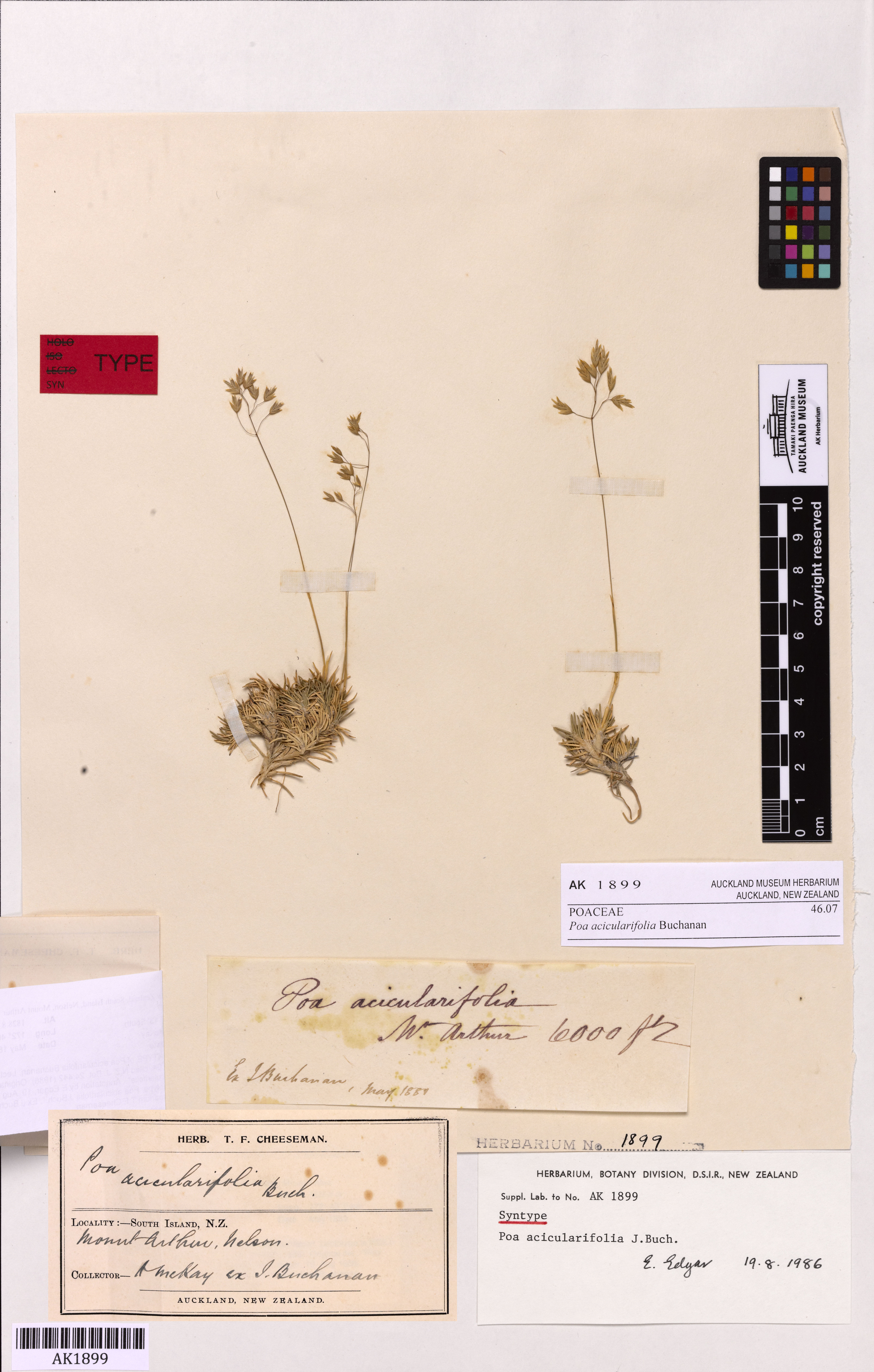

Scientific classification
- Kingdom: Plantae
- Clade: Embryophytes
- Clade: Tracheophytes
- Clade: Angiosperms
- Clade: Monocots
- Clade: Commelinids
- Order: Poales
- Family: Poaceae
- Subfamily: Pooideae
- Genus: Poa
- Species: P. acicularifolia

Binomial name
- Poa acicularifolia Buchanan

= Poa acicularifolia =

Species of grass native to New Zealand

Poa acicularifolia is a perennial species of grass in the family Poaceae. It is native to New Zealand and grows in temperate regions.

== Subspecies ==
There are currently two subspecies in Poa acicularifolia. They are Poa acicularifolia subsp. acicularifolia and Poa acicularifolia subsp. ophitalis.

=== Poa acicularifolia subsp. acicularifolia ===
This subspecies is also commonly known as the limestone cushion poa. It is small and blue-green in color. It can be found on montane and subalpine grasslands. While it is naturally uncommon, it is still at risk due to the spread of hawkweeds and other grasses.

=== Poa acicularifolia subsp. ophitalis ===
This subspecies is native to subalpine regions of New Zealand. It is naturally uncommon due to it living in small areas.
