= Alan Ackerman Beetle =

American botanist

Alan "Doc" Ackerman Beetle
- Born: June 8, 1913; Princeton, New Jersey, United States
- Died: March 27, 2003 (aged 89); Riverton, Wyoming, United States
- Known for: Work with grasses, revising the genus Artemisia
- Notable work: Alan A. Beetle Herbarium
- Spouse: Dorothy Erna Schoof (div. 1963)
- Children: 3
- Parent(s): Ralph Dennison Beetle and Helen Maria Ackerman
- Scientific career
- Fields: Agrostology, Botany
- Institutions: University of Wyoming College of Agriculture

Alan "Doc" Ackerman Beetle (8 June 1913 in Princeton, New Jersey – 27 March 2003 in Riverton, Wyoming) was an American agrostologist and botanist. He was a professor of the University of Wyoming College of Agriculture in Laramie.

== Life ==
Beetle adopted both surnames of his parents (Ralph Dennison Beetle and Helen Maria Ackerman). He was married to botanist and malacologist Dorothy Erna, née Schoof (1918–2005), from whom he was divorced in 1963. They had two children, Howie and Karen. They also adopted a third child, John.

Beetle collected plant specimens with his wife and many other botanists, and is best known for his work with grasses. The Alan A. Beetle Herbarium, a collection of his grass specimens numbering in excess of 10,000, is located at the Department of Rangeland Ecology and Watershed Management at UW. In addition to grasses, Beetle worked together with another botanist in revising the genus Artemisia
