= Poa acinaciphylla =

Scientific classification
- Kingdom: Plantae
- Clade: Tracheophytes
- Clade: Angiosperms
- Clade: Monocots
- Clade: Commelinids
- Order: Poales
- Family: Poaceae
- Subfamily: Pooideae
- Genus: Poa
- Species: P. acinaciphylla

Binomial name
- Poa acinaciphylla É.Desv.

Synonyms
- Poa villaroelii Phil.

Species of grass

Poa acinaciphylla is a grass species native to Chile, first described by Étienne-Émile Desvaux and published in Flora Chilena (1853). It is characterized by its yellowish, glabrous habit, tufted rhizomes, and fertile culms reaching up to 75 cm (30 in) in height. The species bears narrow, folded leaves and a lax, inclined panicle with spikelets containing 1–3 fertile florets. The native range of this species is Central Chile and is a perennial growing primarily in the temperate biome.

== Description ==
The species is a perennial, tufted grass with short, robust rhizomes. Lateral branches lacking. Flowering culms range from 5.5 to 70 cm (2.2 to 27.6 in), occasionally reaching 100 cm, and were originally described by Étienne-Émile Desvaux (Desvaux) as 2–2½ feet tall.

Leaf sheaths are closed and scabrous; Desvaux noted them as tightly appressed to the stem. Ligules are oblong, scarious, and lacerated, measuring 3–6 mm, consistent with Desvaux measurement of nearly 3 lines (≈6 mm).

Blades are linear, coriaceous, flat or folded, 4 to 10 cm (1.6 to 3.9 in) long × 2–8 mm wide, whereas Desvaux described them as 2 to 4 inches (5.1 to 10.2 cm) inches long × 1 line wide (≈2 mm). Both accounts note scabrous surfaces and margins, with Desvaux emphasizing a yellowish color and mucronate apex, and the modern revision describing the apex as abruptly navicular.

The panicle is narrow and pauciflowered, 10 to 15 cm (3.9 to 5.9 in) long × 1–1.5 cm wide, compared to Desvaux "nearly 6 inches (15 cm) inches, sparse, lax, inclined." Spikelets are 4–7 mm long, 1–3‑flowered, consistent with Desvaux account of 1–3 fertile flowers plus a rudiment of a sterile one.

Glumes are unequal, oval, keeled, and obtuse; the lower 1‑veined and shorter, the upper 3‑veined and nearly equaling the floret, matching Desvaux description. Lemmas are 3.5–4.6 mm long, 5‑veined, lanceolate, glabrous, while Gay described them as oval‑elongated, concave‑keeled, obtuse, somewhat trigonal, and 5‑nerved.

Lodicules (paired, rudimentary scales below the ovary of a grass flower) are oblong with a sharp lobe, consistent with Desvaux "oblong, not ciliate, with a long acute lobe." Anthers measure 2.2–2.8 mm, a feature not noted by Desvaux. The caryopsis is about 2 mm, yellowish, elliptical, whereas Desvaux described it as elliptical, triangular‑compressed, and yellowish.

== Taxonomy ==
Poa acinaciphylla was first described by Édouard Desvaux in Flora Chilena (vol. 6: 412, 1854) based on material collected in Chile by Claude Gay (collection no. 1119). The holotype is preserved at Paris (P-DESV-123), with isotypes at other herbaria including fragments and photographs at US (US-88710). The species is placed in Poa sect. Acutifoliae. The name has been accepted in subsequent treatments, including Marticorena & Quezada (1985).

Rodolfo Amando Philippi (Phil.) described Poa villaroeli in 1896. He described the species as a low Poa, tufted, usually glaucous, with the fertile culm entirely sheathed, nearly 14 cm high. The species was found in the higher places of the Andes of the province of Santiago (Chile) by Mr. Arthur Villarroel. P. villaroeli is now accepted as a synonym of P. acinaciphylla by modern floras.
