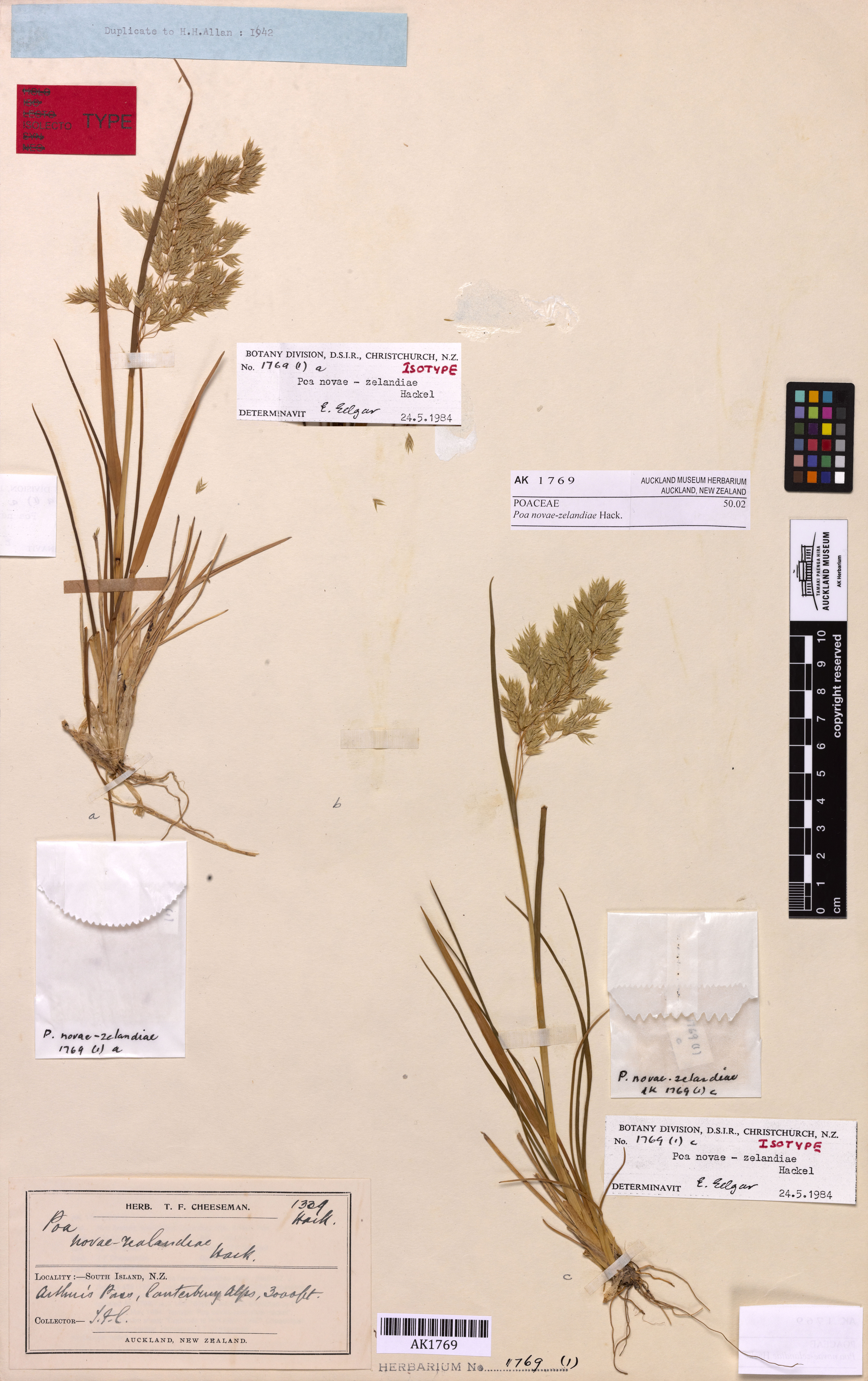

Conservation status
- Not Threatened (NZ TCS)

Scientific classification
- Kingdom: Plantae
- Clade: Tracheophytes
- Clade: Angiosperms
- Clade: Monocots
- Clade: Commelinids
- Order: Poales
- Family: Poaceae
- Subfamily: Pooideae
- Genus: Poa
- Species: P. novae-zelandiae

Binomial name
- Poa novae-zelandiae Hack.

= Poa novae-zelandiae =

Species of plant

Poa novae-zelandiae or drooping poa is a species of grass in the family Poaceae, endemic to New Zealand. It was described by Austrian botanist Eduard Hackel in 1902.

== Distribution ==
Poa novae-zelandiae is endemic to New Zealand, and is found in the North, South, and Stewart Island. In the North Island, it is found from mountains in the Raukūmara Range, the Volcanic Plateau, Taranaki, Ruahine Ranges, and Tararua Ranges. In the South Island, it is found at high altitudes throughout, particularly along and west of Main Divide. On Stewart Island it is found on Mt Anglem.

The type specimens listed in Hackel's 1902 paper are Arthur's Pass at 1000 m, Hooker Glacier, Mount Arthur Plateau, and the Humboldt mountains.

== Habitat ==
Poa novae-zelandiae is a montane and alpine species found in scree and on rocks, as well as in grasslands, riverbeds, fellfield. It is also one of the first colonizers in freshly exposed moraines beneath glaciers.

== Ecology ==
Poa novae-zelandiae is a species common in rocky, sparsely vegetated areas, often in very high alpine environments. At Earnslaw Burn it is described as growing in sparsely vegetated loose debris slopes with small rock ledges, with Ranunculus buchananii, Anisotome pilifera, Luzula rufa, and Epilobium pycnostachyum.

At Mt Aspiring Station, it is described as growing in alpine scree and fellfield above 1800 metres, with Anisotome imbricata, Epilobium purpuratum, Colobanthus buchananii, Leptinella pectinata subsp. wilcoxii, Veronica planopetiolata, Ranunculus buchananii, Luzula pumila, Montia sessiliflora, Haastia sinclairii, and Azorella exigua.

== Identification ==
Poa novae-zelandiae forms stout perennial bright green tufts up to 30 cm tall. The culms are 5-15 cm long, bearing 5-10 cm panicles with dense, often drooping branchlets tipped by large, elliptic, acute spikelets. Spikelets are 6-12 mm long, with 5-8 lightgreen to purplish flowers. Lemmas are 3.5-8 mm long, usually acuminate-tipped.

=== Similar species ===
Poa novae-zelandiae is very similar to Poa subvestita and the two species grow together. Indeed, the isotype of P. novae-zelandiae contains a mixture of the two species. P. novae-zelandiae is gynomonoecious, meaning that some florets are entirely female (with only pistils) and some that are hermaphrodites (with pistils and anthers) on the same plant, while P. subvestita is dioecious, meaning that plants either contain entirely male or entirely female florets. P. subvestita plants are also usually more robust, wider-leaved than in P. subvestita and with lemmas that are subobtuse rather than acuminate, as is common in P. novae-zelandiae.

Poa novae-zelandiae and P. subvestita are both similar to P. sudicola, which differs from them by its long creeping rhizomes.

Putative wild hybrids have been described between P. novae-zelandiae and both of P. colensoi and P. lindsayi. The former was found in the North Island in one site (Tararua Ranges) as well as several sites in the South Island (NW Nelson, Marlborough, and Aoraki/Mt Cook National Park), while the latter was found once in Aoraki/Mt Cook National Park.

== Biology ==
Poa novae-zelandiae is gynomonoecious, meaning that it has some flowers that have both functional male and female flowers, in addition to some flowers that are entirely female. Within each spikelet, the lower 1-2 flowers are hermaphrodites, with functional anthers 0.8-1.2 mm long, as well as 9 upper flowers with minute colourless sterile anthers 0.1-0.3 mm long.

P. novae-zelandiae is part of a group of tetraploid species endemic to New Zealand, with 2n = 28 chromosomes.

It is dispersed by wind and attachment.

== Taxonomy ==
In 1864, Joseph Dalton Hooker includes a taxon equivalent to P. novae-zelandiae within P. foliosa. In 1902, P. novae-zelandiae is finally described as a unique species. In the same text, he also defined two forma and one variety; f. laxiuscula, f. humilior, and var. subvestita. Separately, Donald Petrie described var. wallii.

In 1986 Elizabeth Edgar explained these many infraspecific taxa (other than in var. subvestita) as due to the variation in plant size and density of panicle branches. However, no characters other than size distinguish them, and there is no geographical separation between the forms. For this reason, she reduced all infraspecific names in synonymy under P. novae-zelandiae.

However, the variety var. subvestita was sufficiently distinct to be elevated to a full species P. subvestita.

=== Etymology ===
Poa - from the ancient Greek name 'poa' for grass of fodder.

novae-zelandiae - from New Zealand.

== Gallery ==
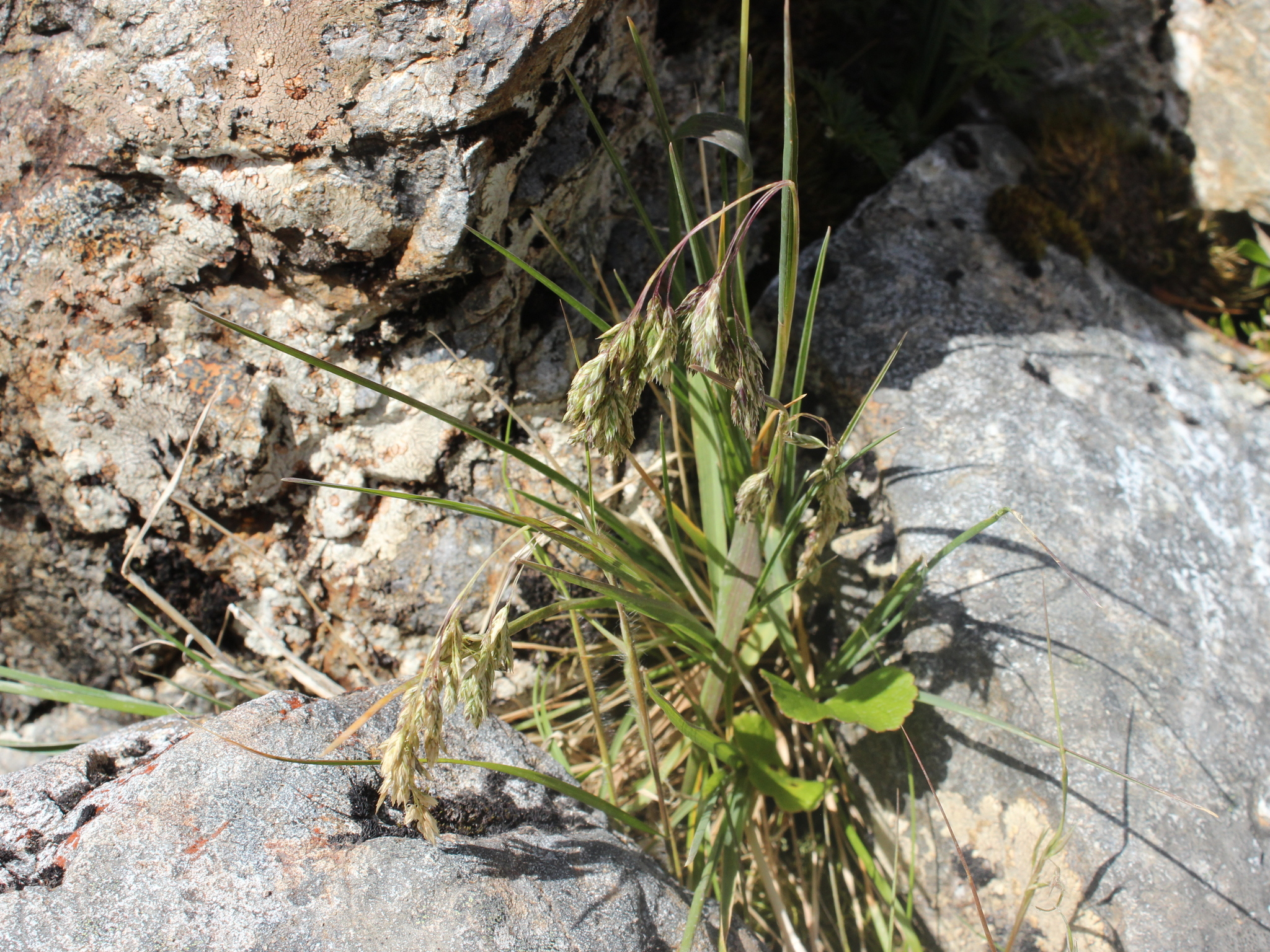

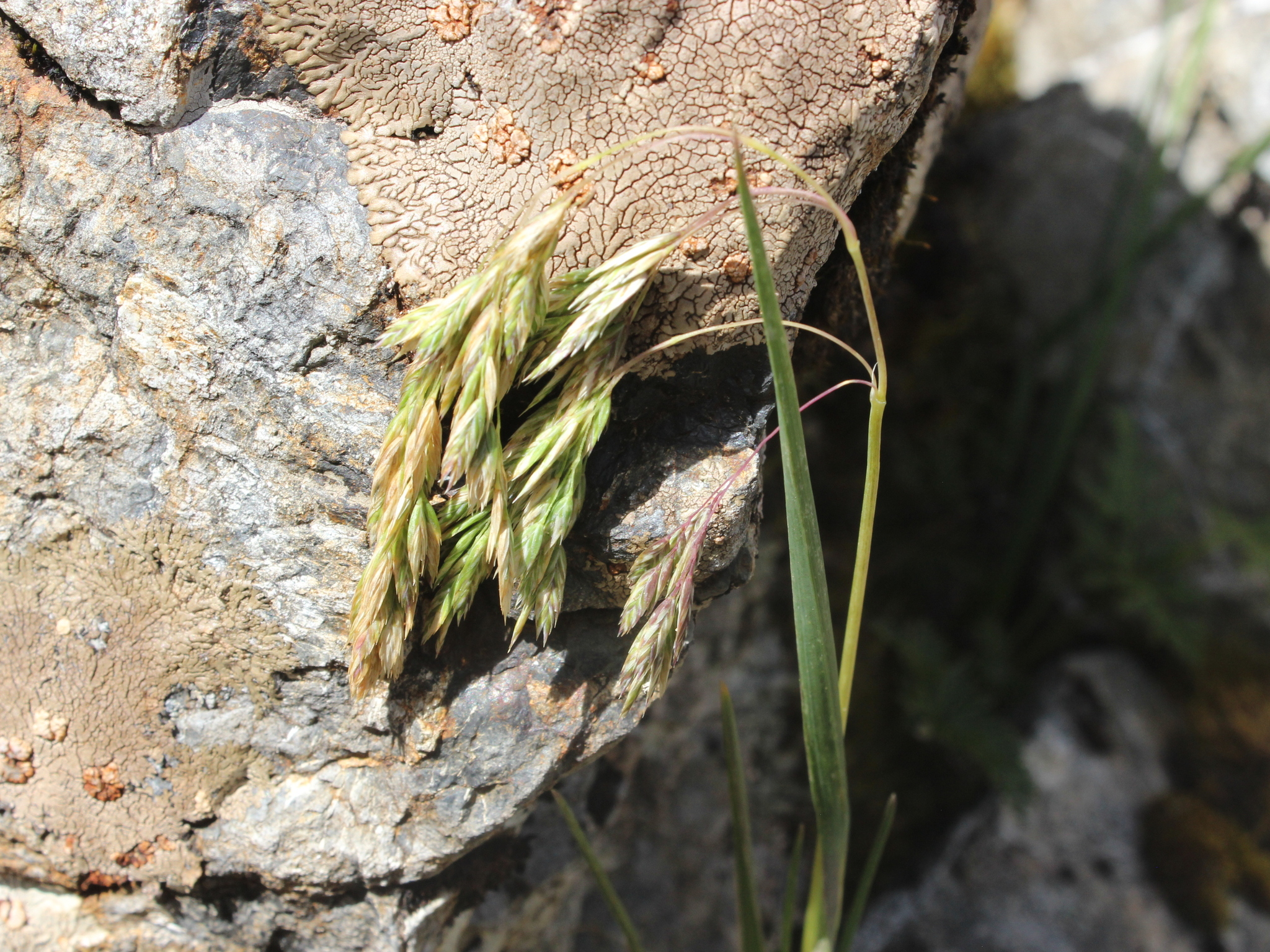
