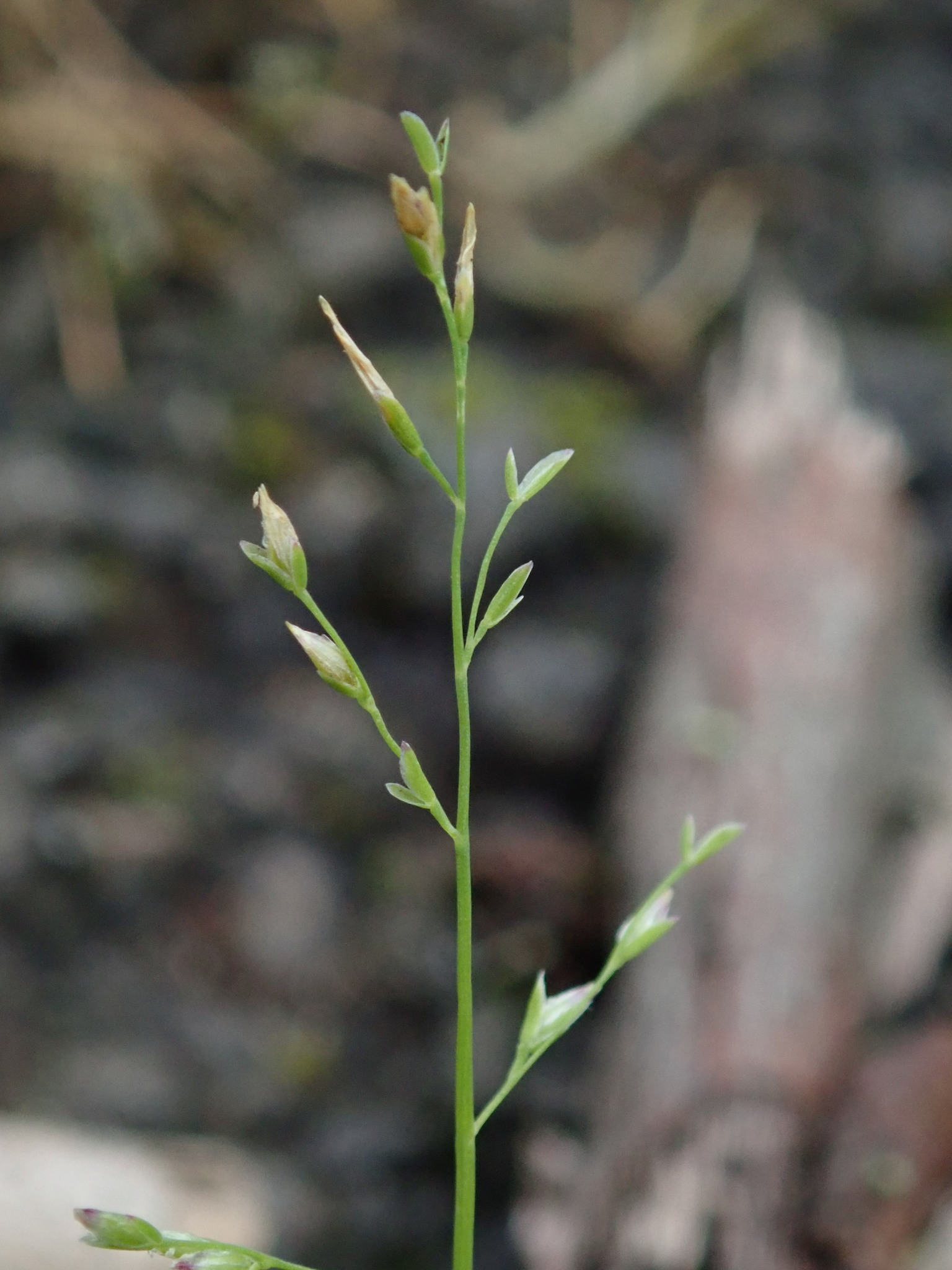

Scientific classification
- Kingdom: Plantae
- Clade: Tracheophytes
- Clade: Angiosperms
- Clade: Monocots
- Clade: Commelinids
- Order: Poales
- Family: Poaceae
- Subfamily: Pooideae
- Genus: Poa
- Species: P. infirma

Binomial name
- Poa infirma Kunth

= Poa infirma =

Species of grass

Poa infirma, also known as early meadow-grass and weak bluegrass, is a species of grass in the genus Poa. It was first described in 1812 by German botanist Carl Sigismund Kunth from a specimen found in Colombia between Fontibón and Santa Fe, in Bogota. Despite this, it is actually introduced in the Americas and is native to Mediterranean Europe, North Africa and West Asia.

== Habitat ==
P. infirma is typically a coastal species, found in open, trampled grassland, on cliff-tops, tracksides, picnic sites, lawns, and car parks, as well as in stabilised dunes.

It can also be found inland, typically in man-made habitats with poor or sand. It is often found in pavement cracks, depressions on eroded concrete, or on gravelly substrate on edges of car parks, roads, or industrial estates.

== Distribution ==
P. infirma is native to Mediterranean Europe, North Africa and West Asia.

It is introduced on most continents:

- Sub-Saharan Africa: Namibia and South Africa.
- Australasia: New Zealand and Australia.
- North America: Western coastline, including British Columbia, Washington, Oregon, California, and Baja California.
- South America: Colombia, Peru, Bolivia, Chile, Argentina.

It is unclear whether P. infirma is indigenous in China and Pakistan.

In Britain, P. infirma has rapidly spread following human disturbance and climate change further north along the coast, as well as further inland.

== Identification ==
P. infirma has two main forms: a small, densely tufted plant with short, compact inflorescences; and a lanky plant with tall, erect culms and spreading panicles. These forms apparently correspond to soil quality, with smaller plants typically growing in poorer soil. Its leaves are strikingly yellow-green.

It is very similar to Poa annua, which is probably a daughter species. The two species can be differentiated by P. infirma having much smaller anthers, elongated paleas, and a yellow-green colour.

== Taxonomy ==
Poa infirma was first described in 1812 by German botanist Carl Sigismund Kunth from a specimen found in Colombia between Fontibón and Santa Fe, in Bogota.

Poa annua is an allotetraploid hybrid species that is derived from P. infirma and P. supina parents around 50,000 years ago. P. annua and P. infirma are often confused and are believed to form a rare sterile hybrid.
