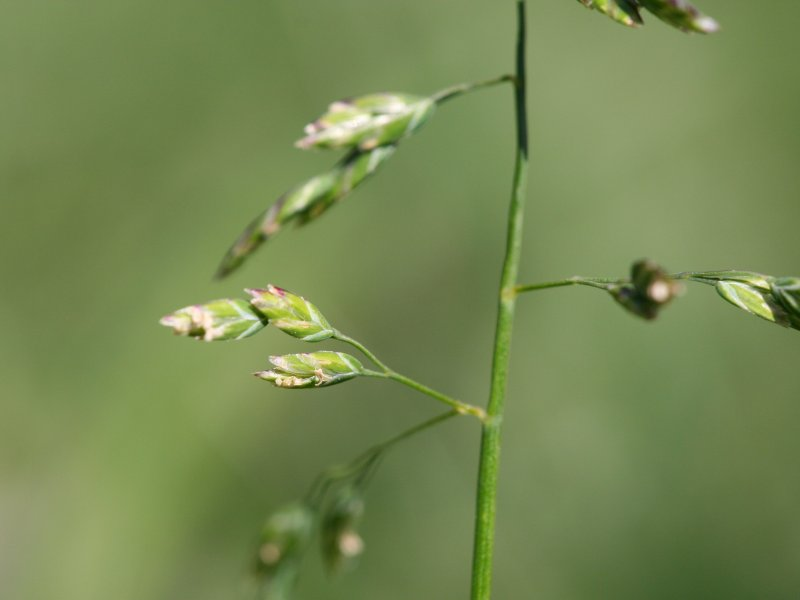

Conservation status
- Least Concern (IUCN 3.1)

Scientific classification
- Kingdom: Plantae
- Clade: Tracheophytes
- Clade: Angiosperms
- Clade: Monocots
- Clade: Commelinids
- Order: Poales
- Family: Poaceae
- Subfamily: Pooideae
- Genus: Poa
- Species: P. annua

Binomial name
- Poa annua L.

= Poa annua =

Species of plant

Poa annua, or annual meadow grass (known in America more commonly as annual bluegrass or simply poa), is a widespread low-growing turfgrass in temperate climates. Notwithstanding the reference to annual plant in its name, perennial biotypes do exist.

It originated as an allopolyploid hybrid between Poa supina and Poa infirma. Major chromosomal rearrangements after polyploidy have contributed to variation in genome size in Poa annua.

== Description ==
It has a slightly creeping, fibrous rootstock. The stem grows from 15–25 cm (6–10 in) high. It is slightly flattened, due to being folded rather than rolled.

The panicle is open and triangular shaped, 5–7.5 cm (2–3 in) long. The spikelets are stalked, awnless, 1–2 cm (0.4–0.8 in) long when flowering, and loosely arranged on delicate paired or spreading branches. Sometimes they are tinged purple.

The vivid green leaves are short and blunt at the tips, shaped like the prow of a small canoe. They are soft and drooping. Long sheaths clasp the stem. The leaves are smooth above and below, with finely serrated edges. Occasionally the leaves are serrated transversely.

The ligule is pointed and silvery, in comparison to common meadowgrass (Poa pratensis), which has a squared ligule, and Poa trivialis, which has a pointed but less silvery ligule.

The leaves are smooth above and below, with finely serrated edges. Occasionally the leaves are serrated transversely.

It is in flower all year around except for severe winters. The seeds ripen and are deposited 8 months of the year. The plant grows rapidly from seed, flowering within 6 weeks, seeding and then dying.

== Distribution and habitat ==
It is a common weed of cultivation, known in the Americas as annual bluegrass. It occurs as a common constituent of lawns, where it is also often treated as a weed, and grows on waste ground. Many golf putting greens, including the Oakmont Country Club greens, are annual bluegrass, although many courses have converted to creeping bentgrass (Agrostis stolonifera).

It has appeared on King George Island in the Antarctic South Shetland Islands as an invasive species, as well as on Australia's subantarctic Heard and Macquarie Islands.

== Taxonomy ==
Poa annua is an allotetraploid hybrid species that is derived from P. infirma and P. supina parents around 50,000 years ago. P. annua and P. infirma are often confused and are believed to form a rare sterile hybrid.

=== Etymology ===
Poa - derived from the Greek name πόα for a type of fodder grass.

annua - Latin, meaning 'annual' or 'lasting a year'.

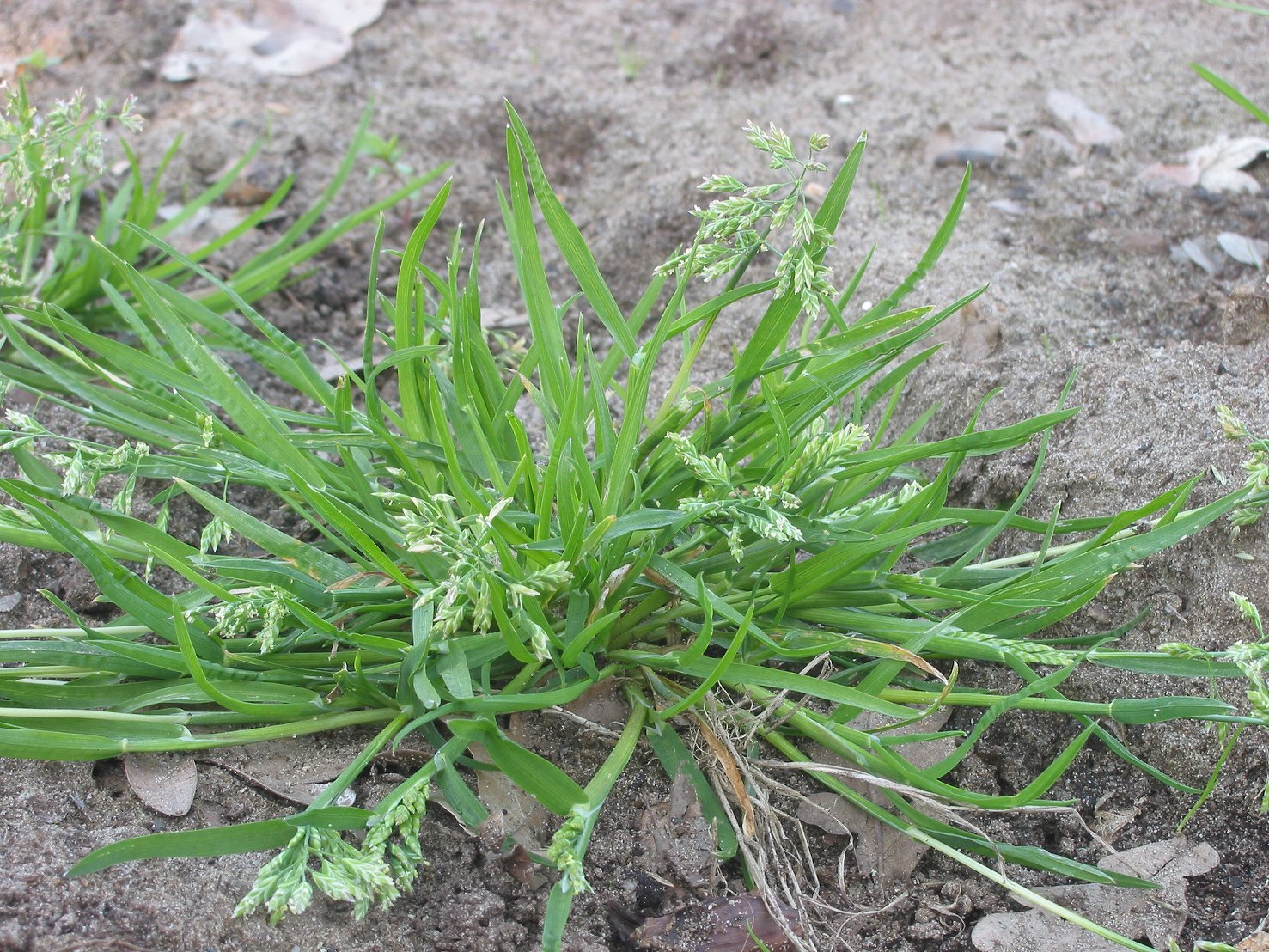
Habit

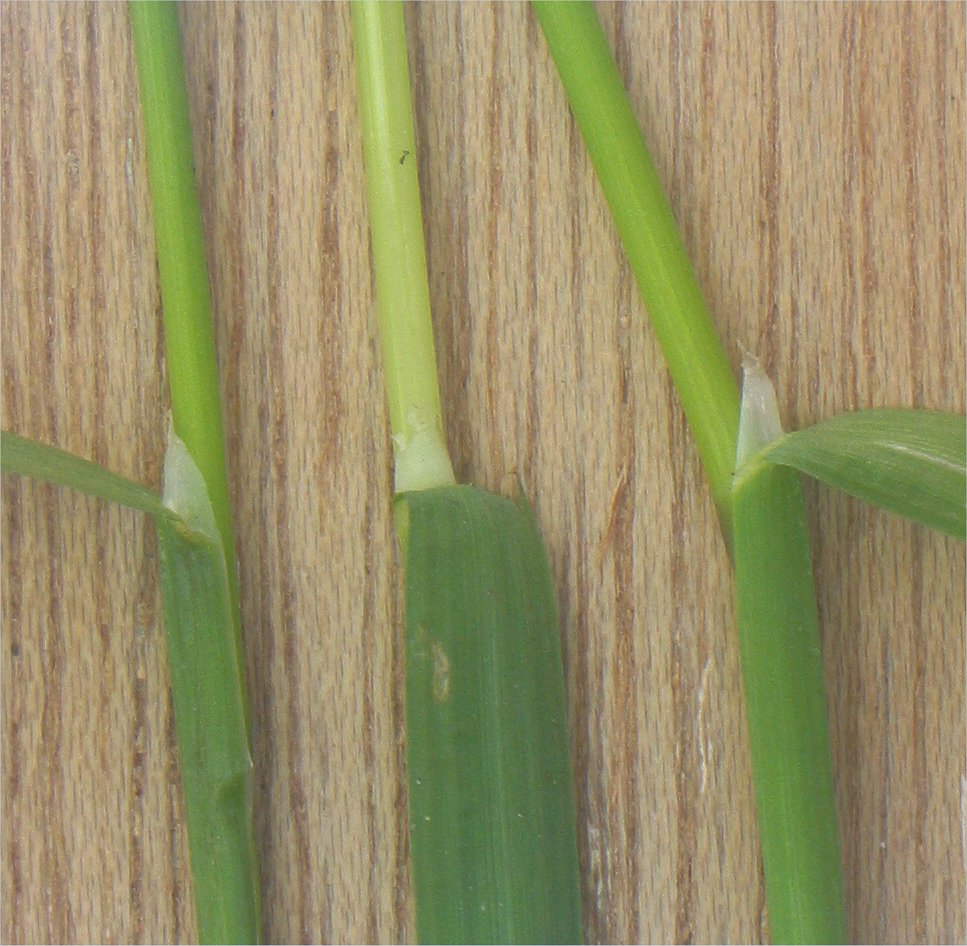
Ligule is silvery and pointed.

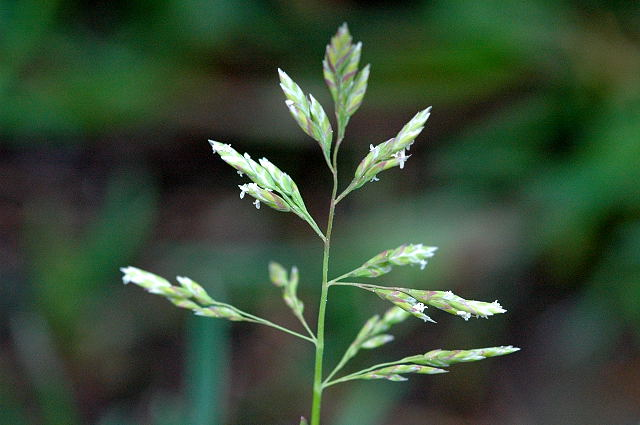
The panicle is open and triangular shaped

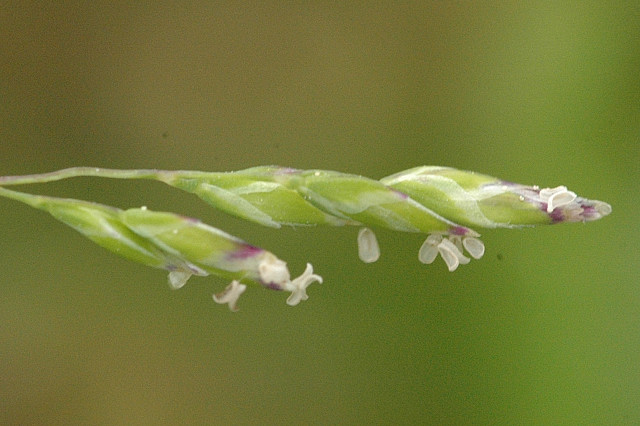
Flowers

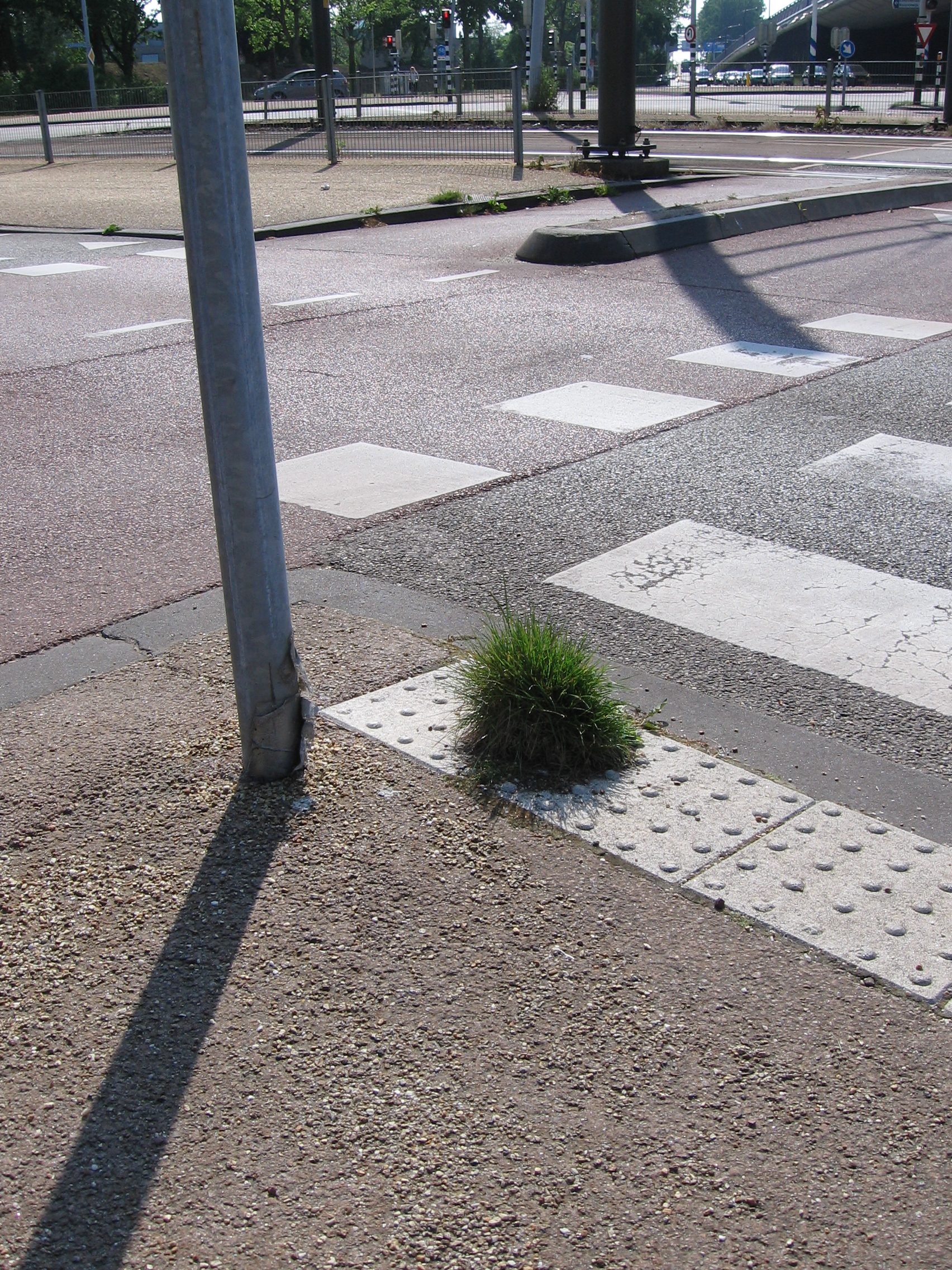
Clump of Poa annua on footpath stones

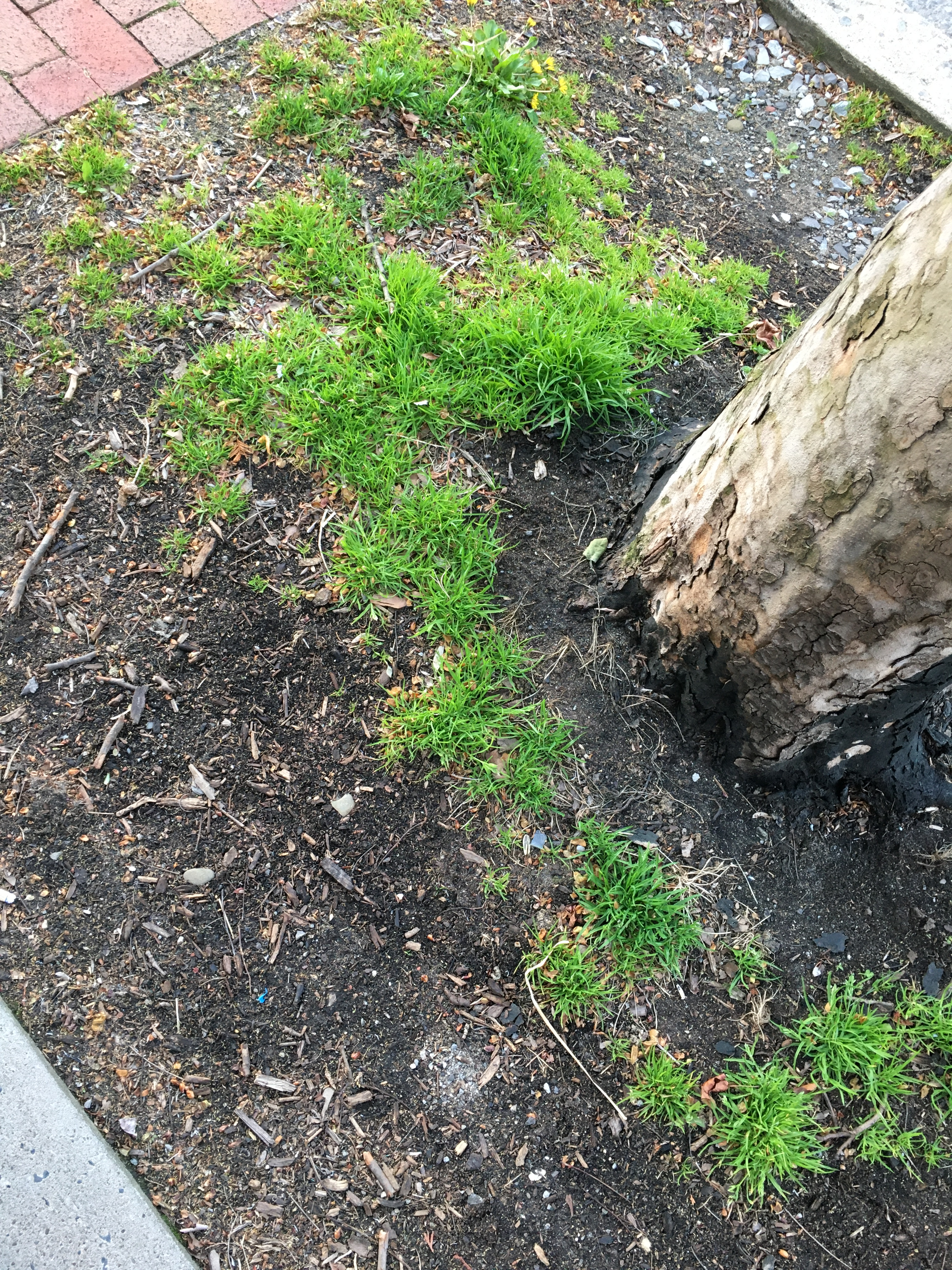
Poa annua as a weed in city and urban ecosystems

Poa annua as a turfgrass for use on golf course putting greens

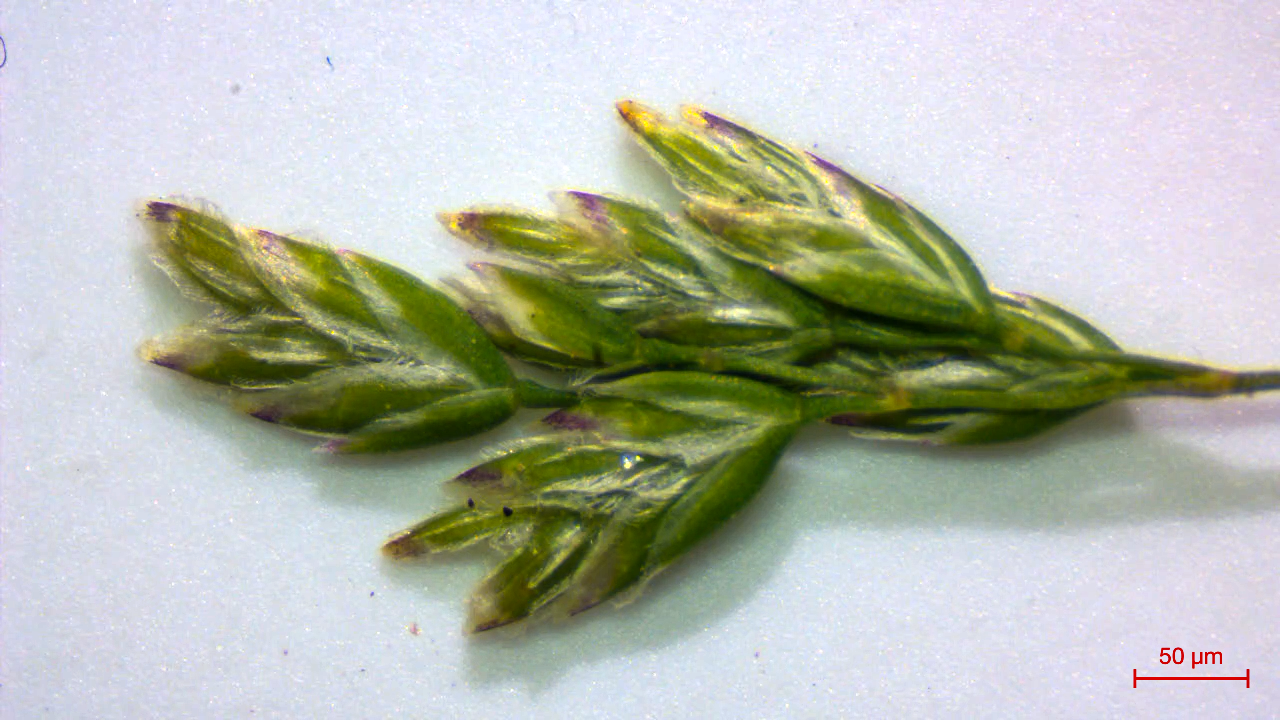
Annual grass bud, often referred to as spikelets
