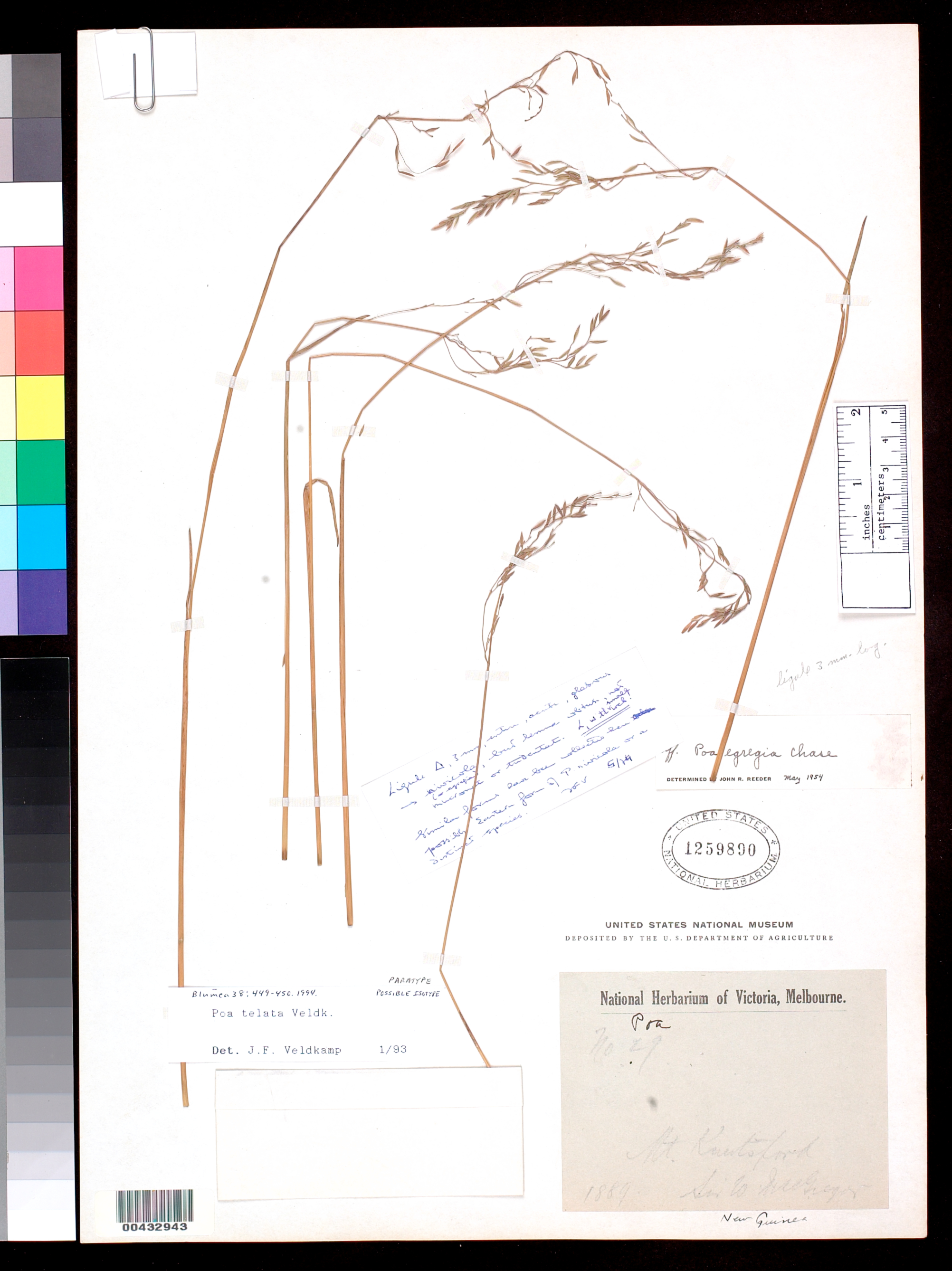

Scientific classification
- Kingdom: Plantae
- Clade: Tracheophytes
- Clade: Angiosperms
- Clade: Monocots
- Clade: Commelinids
- Order: Poales
- Family: Poaceae
- Subfamily: Pooideae
- Genus: Poa
- Species: P. telata

Binomial name
- Poa telata J. F. Veldkamp

= Poa telata =

Species of grass

Poa telata is a species of grass native to New Guinea. It likely inhabits subalpine grassland.
