= Poa granitica =

Scientific classification
- Kingdom: Plantae
- Clade: Tracheophytes
- Clade: Angiosperms
- Clade: Monocots
- Clade: Commelinids
- Order: Poales
- Family: Poaceae
- Subfamily: Pooideae
- Genus: Poa
- Species: P. granitica

Binomial name
- Poa granitica Braun-Blanq.

Species of flowering plant

Poa granitica is a species of grass native to Czechoslovakia, Poland, Romania, and Ukraine.
