= Poa fax =

Scientific classification
- Kingdom: Plantae
- Clade: Tracheophytes
- Clade: Angiosperms
- Clade: Monocots
- Clade: Commelinids
- Order: Poales
- Family: Poaceae
- Subfamily: Pooideae
- Genus: Poa
- Species: P. fax

Binomial name
- Poa fax J.H.Willis & Court

Synonyms
- Neuropoa fax (J.H.Willis & Court) Clayton; Poa lepida F.Muell.

Species of grass native to Australia

Poa fax is a species of grass in the family Poaceae, native to the Australian states of Western Australia, South Australia, New South Wales, and Victoria. This species has the shortest scientific name of any plant. Poa (πόα) is Greek for "fodder", and fax is Latin for "torch" or "flame", referring to "its dense, spike-like inflorescence which resembles a torch with ascending tongues of flame". While the name Poa fax is accepted as valid by Flora of Australia, and some databases reflect this, such as POWO, WCSP and FloraBase, other sources such as Tropicos, WFO and GrassBase consider it a synonym of Neuropoa fax.
