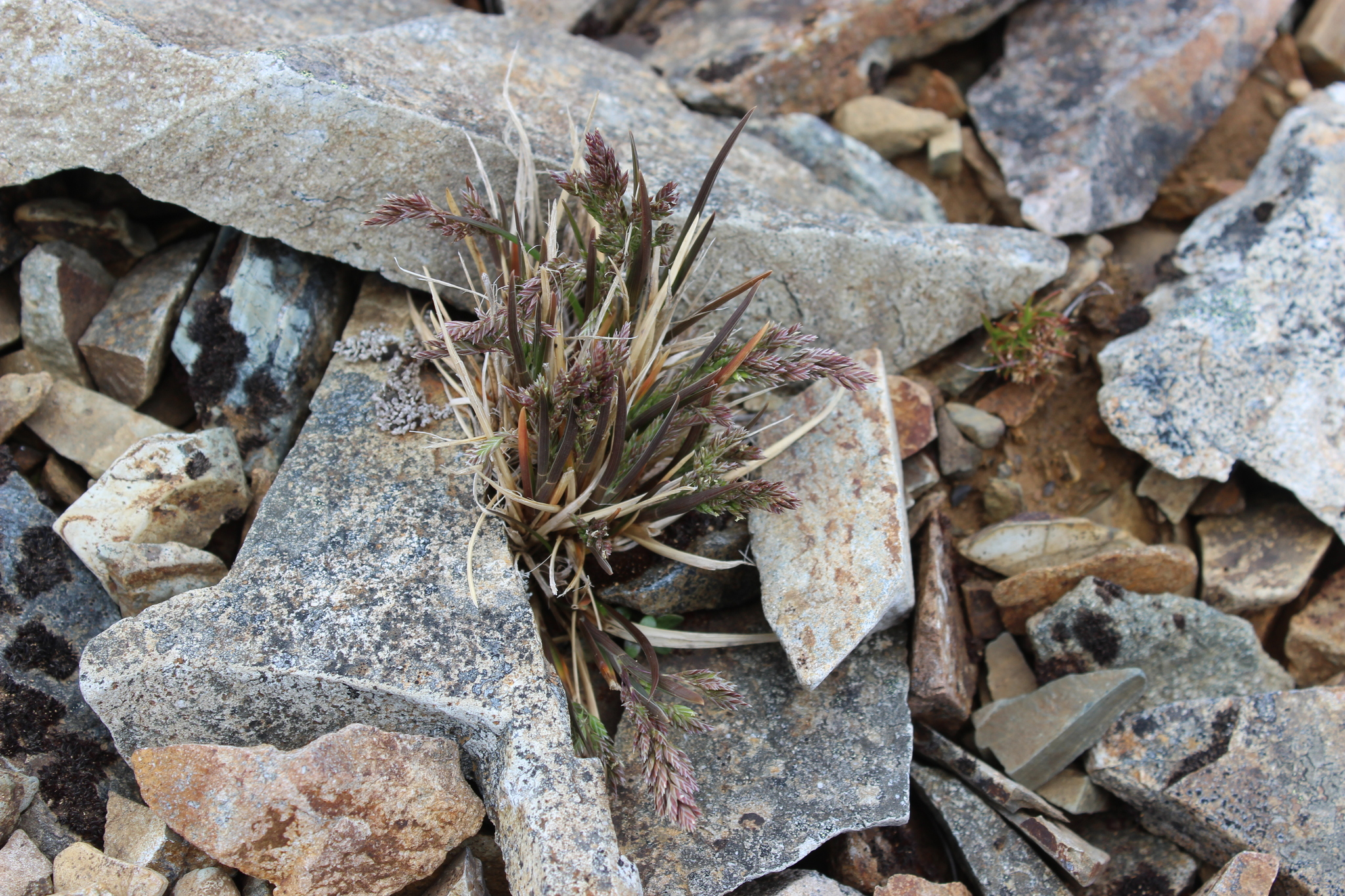

Conservation status
- Not Threatened (NZ TCS)

Scientific classification
- Kingdom: Plantae
- Clade: Tracheophytes
- Clade: Angiosperms
- Clade: Monocots
- Clade: Commelinids
- Order: Poales
- Family: Poaceae
- Subfamily: Pooideae
- Genus: Poa
- Species: P. subvestita

Binomial name
- Poa subvestita (Hack.) Edgar

= Poa subvestita =

Species of grass

Poa subvestita is a species of grass in the family Poaceae, endemic to the South Island of New Zealand. It was described by Austrian botanist Eduard Hackel in 1902 as Poa novae-zelandiae var. subvestita. It has since been recognised as a distinct species.

== Distribution ==
Poa subvestita is endemic to the South Island of New Zealand, found largely on the Main Divide and to its west, and occasionally to its east.

The type specimen was a female plant collected by Leonard Cockayne in Arthurs Pass in 1898.

== Habitat ==
P. subvestita is found in montane to alpine zones on shaded rocks and cliffs. It is particularly common on limestone and marble, and often grows in areas made damp by waterfalls.

== Identification ==
P. subvestita forms robust perennial tufts to 40 cm, with erect, wide, stiff leaves that are persistent at ligules. The leaf-sheath is glabrous and the ligule glabrous and entire. The culm overtops the leaves, and bears a lax, sometimes dense, drooping panicle with large spikelets (8-10 mm). Spikelets contain 4-6 dioecious flowers with subequal glumes, and glabrous, subobtuse-tipped lemmas.

=== Similar species ===
Poa subvestita is very similar to P. novae-zelandiae and the two species of grow together. Indeed, the isotype of P. novae-zelandiae contains a mixture of the two species. P. novae-zelandiae is gynomonoecious, meaning that some florets are entirely female (with only pistils) and some that are hermaphrodites (with pistils and anthers) on the same plant, while P. subvestita is dioecious, meaning that plants either contain entirely male or entirely female florets. P. subvestita plants are also usually more robust, wider-leaved than in P. novae-zelandiae and with lemmas that are subobtuse rather than acuminate, as is common in P. novae-zelandiae.

Poa subvestita and P. novae-zelandiae are both similar to P. sudicola, which differs from them by its long creeping rhizomes.

P. subvestita forms a putative wild hybrid with Poa hesperia, which has been collected in Fiordland and western Otago.

== Biology ==
Poa subvestita is a dioecious species. Male plants contains a tiny gynoecium (less than 0.2mm), and females smaller (0.3-0.7 versus 2-3mm) pollen-sterile anthers. Dioecy has appeared three times in Poa, with P. subvestita being part of a dioecious group of New Zealand species including P. sudicola and P. foliosa.

P. subvestita is part of a group of tetraploid species endemic to New Zealand, with 2n = 28 chromosomes.

It is dispersed by wind and attachment.

== Taxonomy ==
P. subvestita was described by Austrian botanist Eduard Hackel in 1902 as Poa novae-zelandiae var. subvestita. It was elevated to specific rank by Elizabeth Edgar in 1986.

=== Etymology ===
Poa - from the ancient Greek name 'poa' for grass of fodder.

subvestita - partially clothed in hairs.

== Gallery ==
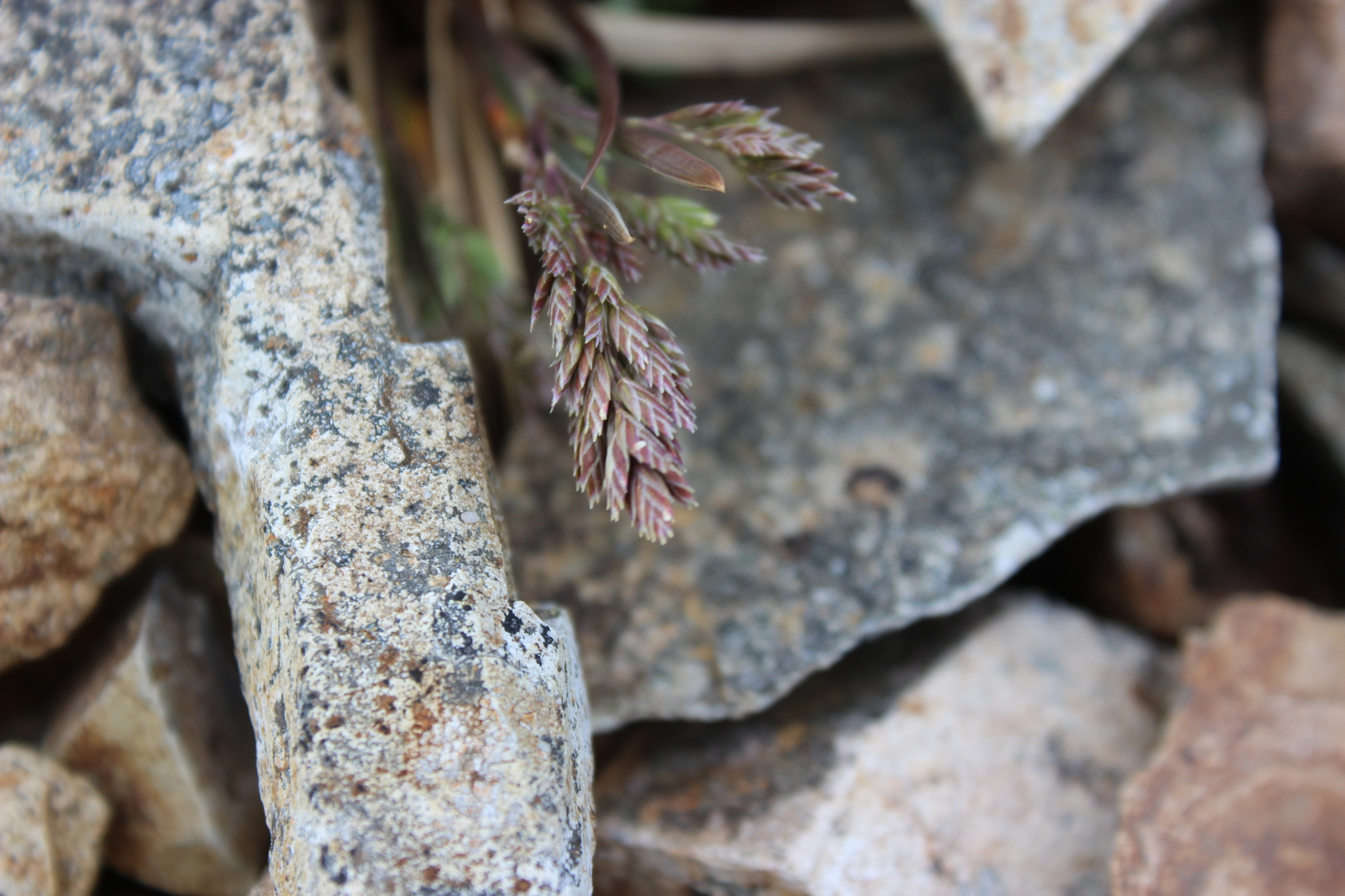
Male spikelets
