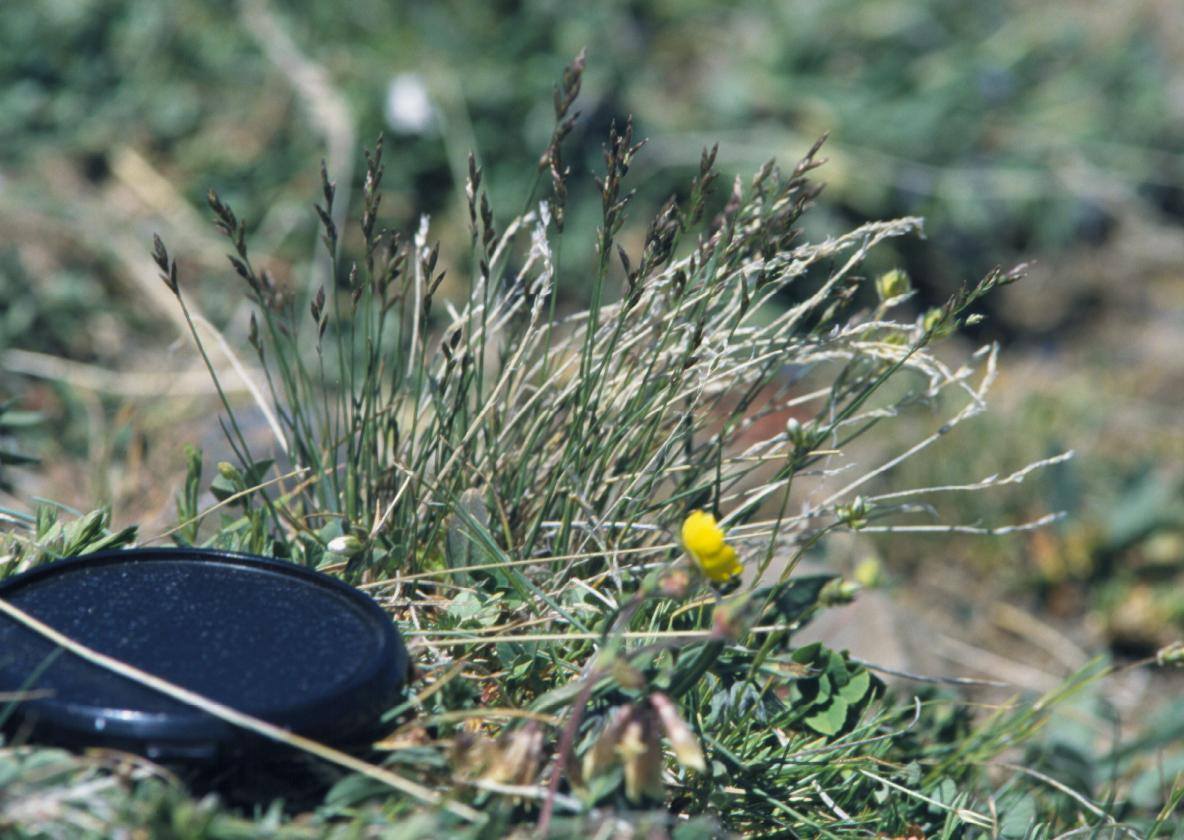
- In Montana

Scientific classification
- Kingdom: Plantae
- Clade: Tracheophytes
- Clade: Angiosperms
- Clade: Monocots
- Clade: Commelinids
- Order: Poales
- Family: Poaceae
- Subfamily: Pooideae
- Genus: Poa
- Species: P. pattersonii

Binomial name
- Poa pattersonii Vasey

Synonyms
- Poa abbreviata var. pattersonii (Vasey) Tiehm; Poa abbreviata subsp. pattersonii (Vasey) Á.Löve, D.Löve & B.M.Kapoor

= Poa pattersonii =

Species of plant

Poa pattersonii, called Patterson's bluegrass, is a species of flowering plant in the family Poaceae. It is native to western North America. A perennial, it blooms in July.
