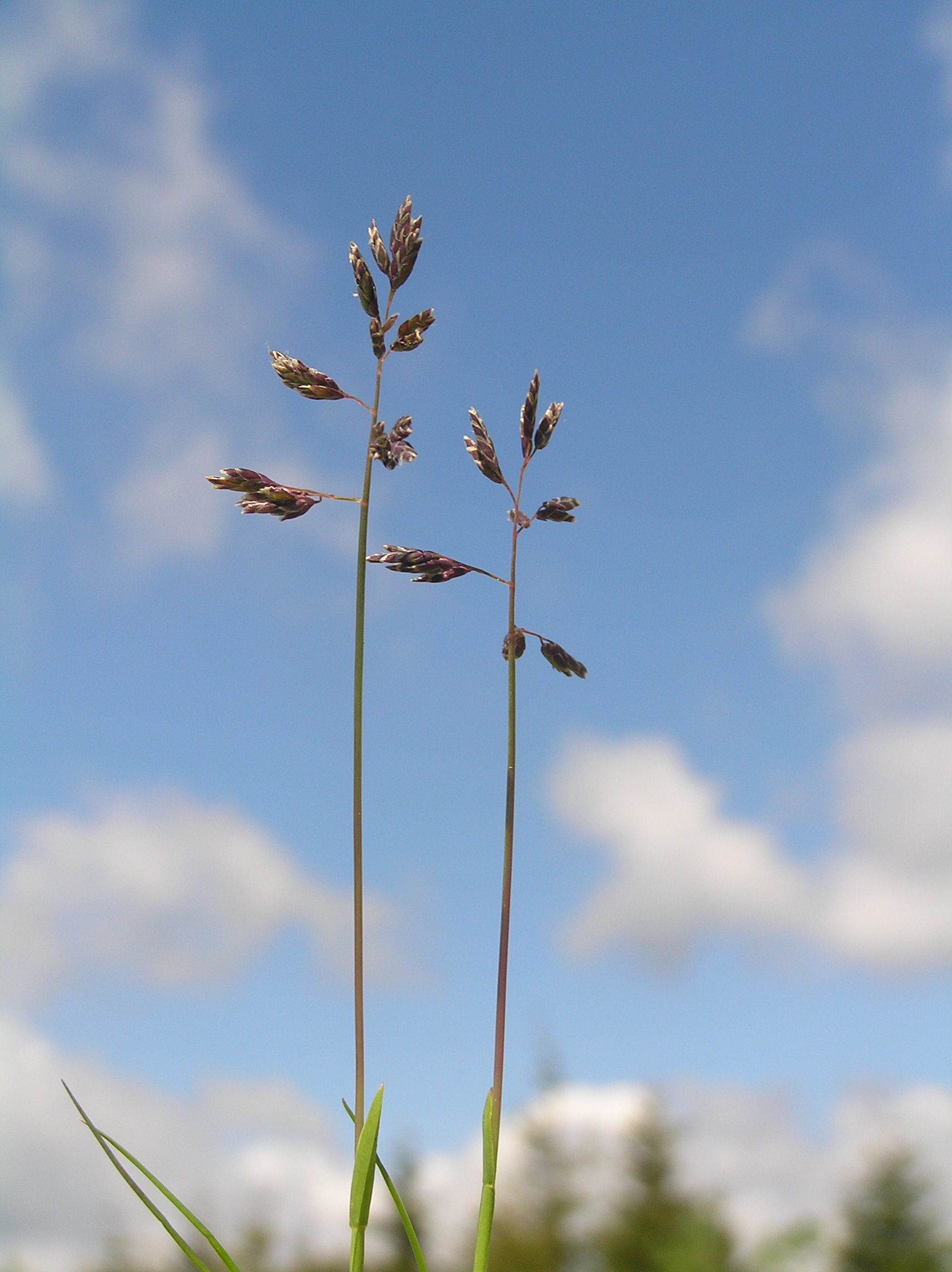

Scientific classification
- Kingdom: Plantae
- Clade: Tracheophytes
- Clade: Angiosperms
- Clade: Monocots
- Clade: Commelinids
- Order: Poales
- Family: Poaceae
- Subfamily: Pooideae
- Genus: Poa
- Species: P. supina

Binomial name
- Poa supina Schrad.

= Poa supina =

Species of grass

Poa supina is a species of flowering plant belonging to the family Poaceae.

Its native range is Morocco, Europe to Mongolia and Himalaya.

Poa supina has both shade and traffic tolerance, making it ideal as a turfgrass on sports fields and in areas where other grasses have difficulty growing.
