= Poa minor =

Scientific classification
- Kingdom: Plantae
- Clade: Tracheophytes
- Clade: Angiosperms
- Clade: Monocots
- Clade: Commelinids
- Order: Poales
- Family: Poaceae
- Subfamily: Pooideae
- Genus: Poa
- Species: P. minor

Binomial name
- Poa minor Gaudin

Synonyms
- List: Poa alpina var. supina Neilr.; Poa laxa subsp. minor (Gaudin) Hook.f.; Poa laxa var. minor (Gaudin) Fiori; Poa laxa var. tremula Grecescu; Poa minor var. aurata Schroet. & Jaccard; Poa minor var. minima Beck; Poa minor subsp. nevadensis Nannf.; Poa minor f. pendula Tuzson; Poa minor var. vaginoides Nyár.; Poa pseudolaxa Schur; Poa pyrenaica Lange; Poa tenella Hoppe ex Trin.; Poa tremula Schur; Poa tremula f. pendula (Tuzson) Ghisa & Beldie

Species of plant

Poa minor is a species of flowering plant in the grass family Poaceae. It is native to the mountains of southern and central Europe: Sierra Nevada, Pyrenees, Alps, the Balkans and the Southern Carpathians. A perennial, it is typically found on limestone and schist in rocky places such as crevices and talus fields, and in sheltered meadows, at elevations from 2,000 to 3,350 m (6,600 to 11,000 ft).
