= Poa caespitosa =

Poa caespitosa is a synonym for various grasses in the Poa genus.

- Poa caespitosa (G. Forst.) Hook. ex Speg. – Poa flabellata
- Poa caespitosa Poir. – Poa nemoralis
- Poa caespitosa Sprengel – Poa cita
- Poa caespitosa alpina F.Muell. – Poa gunnii
- Poa caespitosa var. affinis (R.Br.) Benth. – Poa affinis
- Poa caespitosa var. australis Benth. – Poa sieberiana
- Poa caespitosa var. latifolia Benth. – Poa ensiformis
- Poa caespitosa var. plebeia (R. Br.) Benth. – Poa poiformis
- Poa caespitosa var. serpentum (Nees) Benth. – Poa porphyroclados
- Poa caespitosa var. tenera (Hook.f.) Benth. – Poa tenera
