= Bog bluegrass =

Bog bluegrass is a common name for several plants and may refer to:

- Poa leptocoma, native to western North America
- Poa paludigena, native to northeastern North America
