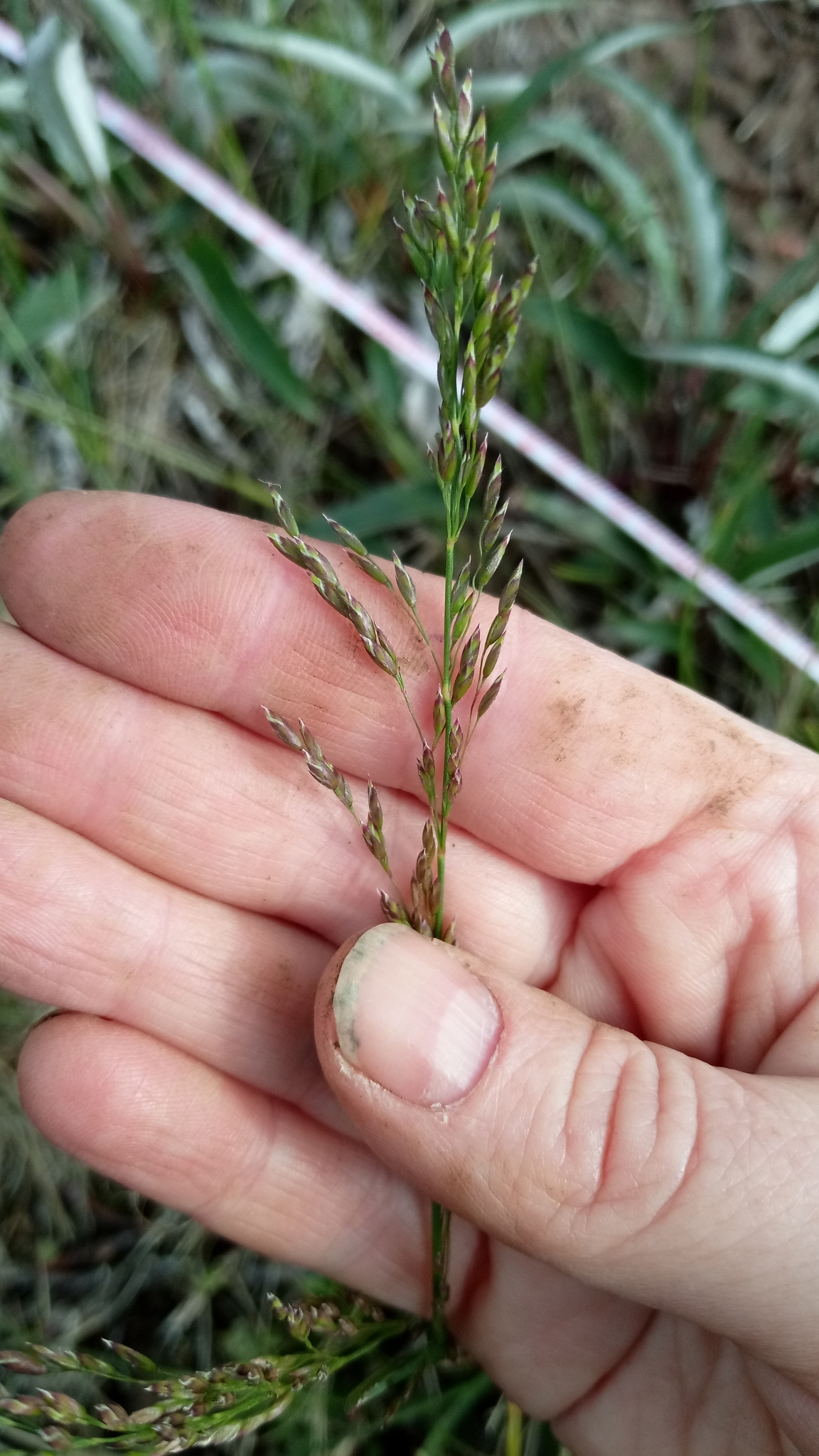

Scientific classification
- Kingdom: Plantae
- Clade: Tracheophytes
- Clade: Angiosperms
- Clade: Monocots
- Clade: Commelinids
- Order: Poales
- Family: Poaceae
- Subfamily: Pooideae
- Genus: Poa
- Species: P. alpigena

Binomial name
- Poa alpigena Lindm.

Synonyms
- List: Poa alpigena var. iantha (Laest.) Lindm.; Poa angustifolia var. alpigena Vorosch.; Poa pratensis var. alpestris Andersson; Poa pratensis subsp. alpestris Portal; Poa pratensis subsp. alpigena (Lindm.) Hiitonen; Poa pratensis var. alpigena Blytt; Poa pratensis var. iantha Laest.; Poa alpigena var. domestica (Laest.) Lindm.; Poa alpigena f. oblonga Lindm.; Poa alpigena f. pyramidata Lindm.; Poa alpigena subsp. staintonii Melderis; Poa alpigena f. villosa Lindm.; Poa alpigena f. vivipara Roshev.; Poa alpigena var. vivipara Hultén; Poa irrigata f. rigens (Hartm.) Lindm.; Poa poophagorum var. lanata Bor; Poa pratensis var. domestica Laest.; Poa pratensis f. hultenii B.Boivin; Poa pratensis f. prolifera Simmons; Poa pratensis var. rigens (Hartm.) Laest.; Poa pratensis subsp. rigens (Hartm.) Tzvelev; Poa pratensis subsp. staintonii (Melderis) Dickoré; Poa rigens Hartm.

= Poa alpigena =

Species of grass

Poa alpigena is a species of grass in the family Poaceae. It occurs in mountainous regions. Its specific epithet "alpigena" means "growing in the alpine".

== Description ==
Poa alpigena grows up to 75 cm (30 in) tall, with firm leaf blades. Its panicle grows up to 13 cm (5.1 in) high, with its lax branches sometimes reflexed. Its crowded spikelets are 3–7 mm (0.12–0.28 in) long. Its glumes are lance-ovate, with the second glume sometime reaching to the middle of the lemma above it. The nerves of the glumes range from glabrous to scabrous, and the lemmas are minutely pubescent.

Poa alpigena has a similar habit to Poa arida, only taller. The most distinguishing characteristic of P. alpigena is its curved underground stem.

The grass flowers from June to August.

== Distribution and habitat ==
Poa alpigena occurs in alpine meadows, wet slopes, bogs, and other similar wet areas. It can be found from Greenland and Labrador to the Yukon, and as far south as Newfoundland, Michigan, Prince Edward Island, and the alpine areas of the White Mountains. In terms of soil content, P. alpigena prefers loose, deep soil, especially sandy alluvium.
