= Poa subcaerulea =

Scientific classification
- Kingdom: Plantae
- Clade: Tracheophytes
- Clade: Angiosperms
- Clade: Monocots
- Clade: Commelinids
- Order: Poales
- Family: Poaceae
- Subfamily: Pooideae
- Genus: Poa
- Species: P. subcaerulea

Binomial name
- Poa subcaerulea Sm.

Species of grass

Poa subcaerulea is a perennial grass occurring in North America and Europe. Its specific epithet "subcaerulea" means "bluish". Its diploid number varies between 54 and 109.

== Description ==
Poa subcaerulea grows from stolons, with its culms arising from older, dried leaves among the curved stolons. Newer, basal tufts of culms occur on separate prolonged stolons. The culms are compressed at their base and grow 5–60 cm (2.0–23.6 in) tall. The leaves are flat or folded, with basal leaves 2–4 mm (0.079–0.157 in) wide. The ellipsoid or pyramidal panicle is 3–7 cm (1.2–2.8 in) high, with lower fascicles of two to five branches. Its spikelets have short pedicels and are borne on the lower half of the branches, growing 4.5–6.5 mm (0.18–0.26 in) long. Its ovate glumes are straight, with the second glume nearly reaching the lemma above it. The lemmas have glabrous or papillate nerves. Roots are produced from the end of February to early May, leaves are produced onwards after March, and the grass flowers from July to August.

Poa subcaerulea can be distinguished from other species of Poa by its more bluish culms. It especially differs from Poa angustifolia by its production of single tillers on spreading rhizomes, and from variants of Poa pratensis by its short panicle, low number of spikelets, and a tendency towards two floral branches at the inflorescence's lowest node.

== Distribution and habitat ==
Poa subcaerulea occurs near damp rocks, in sands, and in woodlands. In North America, the grass occurs from Labrador down to Minnesota and eastward to New Brunswick and Nova Scotia. In Britain, the grass occurs in the hills of Scotland and Wales and in sand dunes along the British coast, occurring predominately in northerly moist areas. The plant can also be found in Fennoscandia, Denmark, and Iceland. The plant is most common between 50°N and the Arctic Circle.
