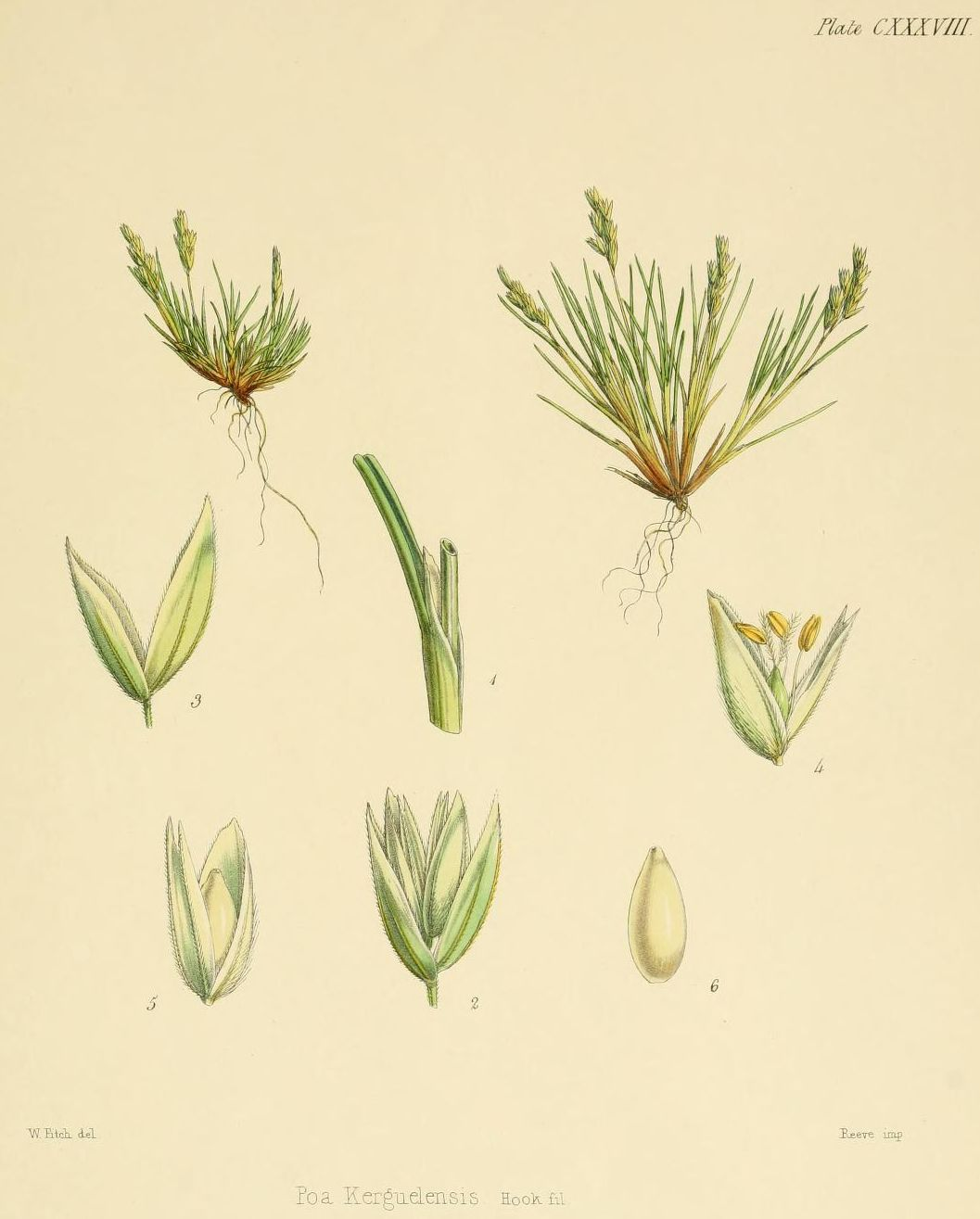

Scientific classification
- Kingdom: Plantae
- Clade: Tracheophytes
- Clade: Angiosperms
- Clade: Monocots
- Clade: Commelinids
- Order: Poales
- Family: Poaceae
- Subfamily: Pooideae
- Genus: Poa
- Species: P. kerguelensis

Binomial name
- Poa kerguelensis (Hook.f.) Steud.

Synonyms
- Triodia kerguelensis Hook.f.; Festuca kerguelensis (Hook.f.) Hook.f.; Tzvelevia kerguelensis (Hook.f.) Alekseev

= Poa kerguelensis =

Species of grass

Poa kerguelensis is a species of tussock grass native to various subantarctic islands. The specific epithet refers to the type locality – the Kerguelen Islands.

== Description ==
Poa kerguelensis is a perennial grass growing as hummocks up to 80 mm high and 150 mm in diameter.

== Distribution and habitat ==
The grass is found on the Heard, McDonald and Kerguelen Islands of the southern Indian Ocean. It grows on bare soil and in rocky areas where its hummocks trap wind-blown sand. On Heard Island it hybridises with Poa cookii It is a pioneer coloniser of recently deglaciated areas.
