= Poa leioclada =

Conservation status
- Least Concern (IUCN 3.1)

Scientific classification
- Kingdom: Plantae
- Clade: Tracheophytes
- Clade: Angiosperms
- Clade: Monocots
- Clade: Commelinids
- Order: Poales
- Family: Poaceae
- Subfamily: Pooideae
- Genus: Poa
- Species: P. leioclada

Binomial name
- Poa leioclada Hack.

Species of grass

Poa leioclada is a species of grass that is endemic to Ecuador.
