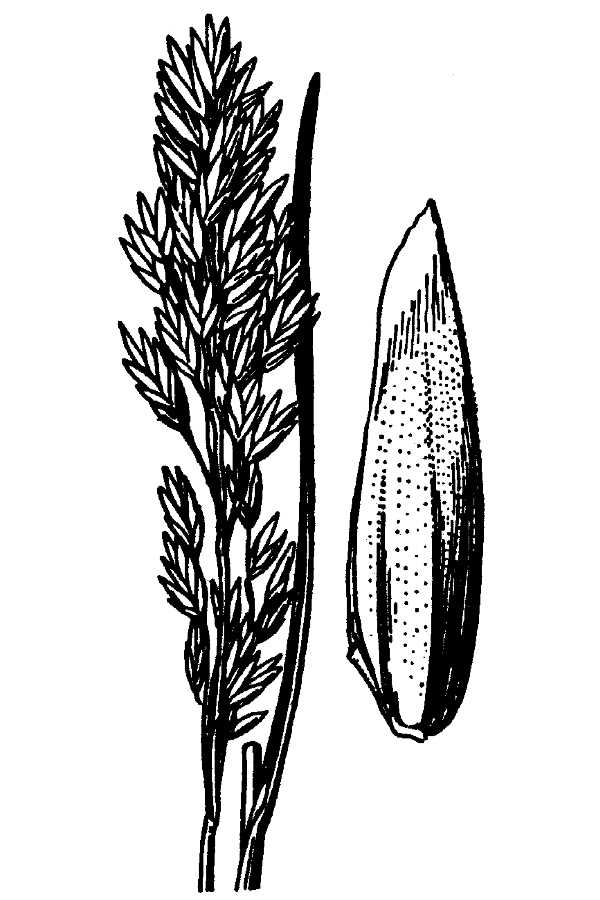

Scientific classification
- Kingdom: Plantae
- Clade: Tracheophytes
- Clade: Angiosperms
- Clade: Monocots
- Clade: Commelinids
- Order: Poales
- Family: Poaceae
- Subfamily: Pooideae
- Genus: Poa
- Species: P. cusickii

Binomial name
- Poa cusickii Vasey

= Poa cusickii =

Species of plant

Poa cusickii is a species of grass known by the common name Cusick's bluegrass. It is native to western North America from Yukon to Colorado to eastern California, where it grows in many types of habitat, including high mountain meadows and slopes, sagebrush scrub, and forests.

== Description ==
It is a perennial bunchgrass growing dense, sometimes large, clumps up to about 60 centimeters in maximum height. The narrow leaves are firm and sometimes rolled along the edges. The longest leaves are located around the middle of the stem. The inflorescence is a dense, narrow series of overlapping branches bearing up to 100 spikelets in total.

The grass is dioecious, with male and female individuals producing different types of flowers in their inflorescences. The plant often reproduces vegetatively via tillers, or via apomixis with unfertilized seeds, and some populations are made up only of female individuals. One subspecies, ssp. purpurascens, is all female.
