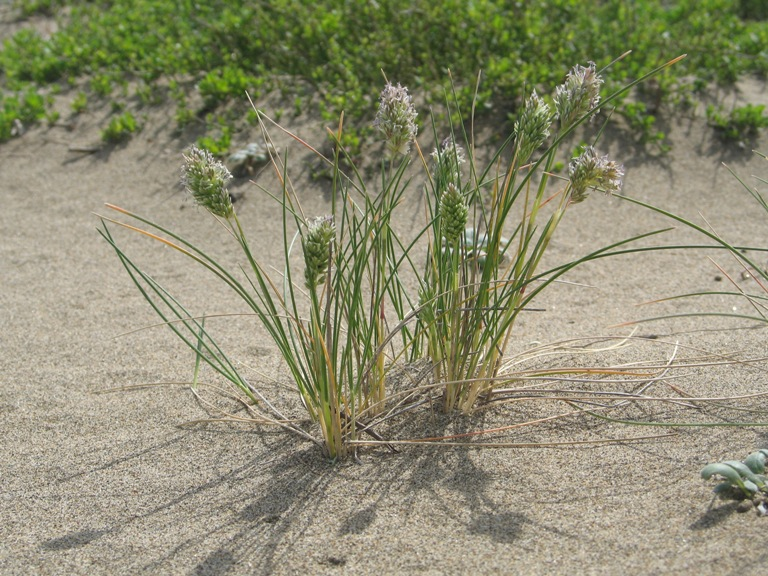

Scientific classification
- Kingdom: Plantae
- Clade: Tracheophytes
- Clade: Angiosperms
- Clade: Monocots
- Clade: Commelinids
- Order: Poales
- Family: Poaceae
- Subfamily: Pooideae
- Genus: Poa
- Species: P. douglasii

Binomial name
- Poa douglasii Nees

Synonyms
- Brizopyrum douglasii Hook. & Arn.; Poa californica Steud.

= Poa douglasii =

Species of grass

Poa douglasii is a species of grass known by the common names Douglas' bluegrass and sand dune bluegrass. It is endemic to the coastline of California, where it grows in shifting sand dunes. It can be found mostly along the Central Coast and Channel Islands, and occasionally on the North Coast north of Mendocino. It is a perennial grass growing small, dense clumps up to about 30 centimeters in maximum height. It grows from a network of long rhizomes and stolons that anchor the grass to its loose sandy substrate; this network may be up to one meter long. The inflorescence is a dense, oval-shaped series of overlapping spikelets. The grass is dioecious, with male and female individuals producing different types of flowers in their inflorescences. This species, like many sand-dune endemic plants, is threatened by invasive species.
