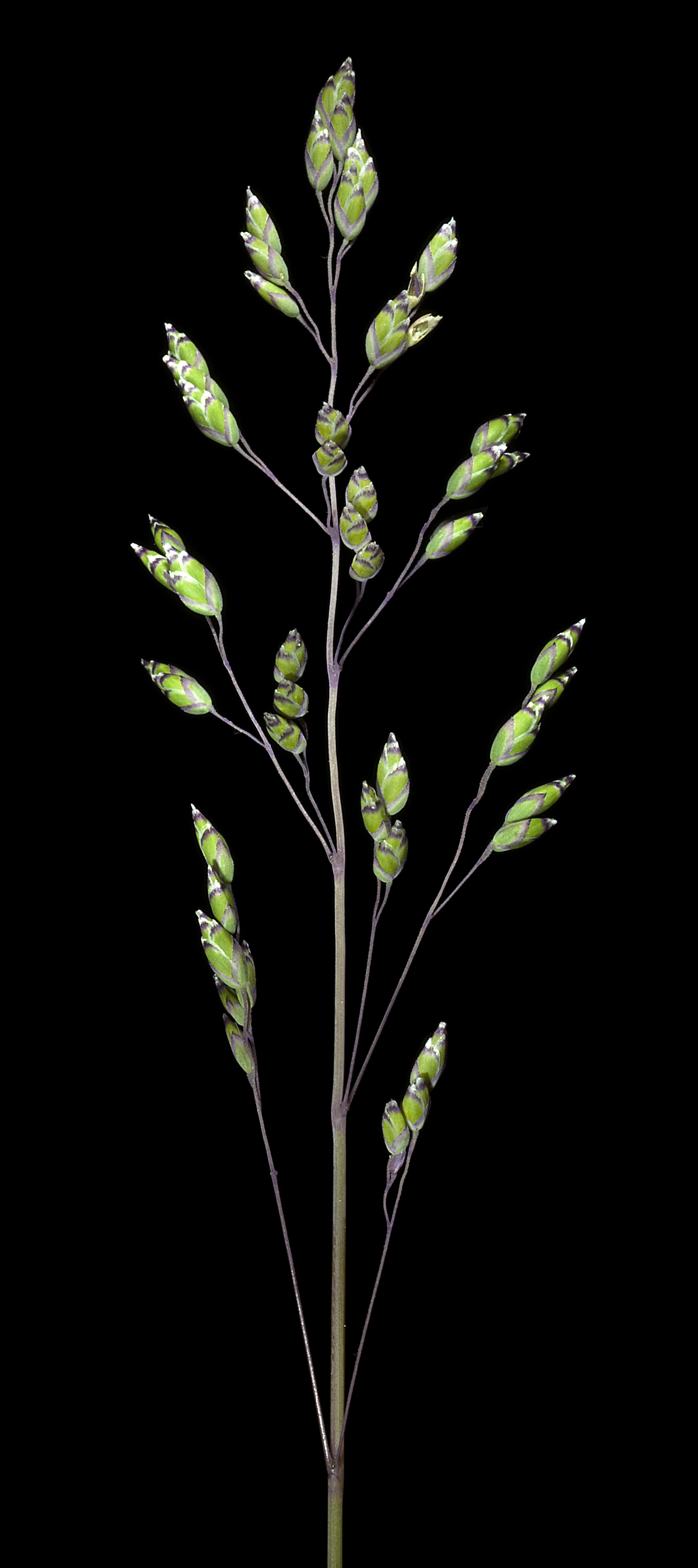

Scientific classification
- Kingdom: Plantae
- Clade: Tracheophytes
- Clade: Angiosperms
- Clade: Monocots
- Clade: Commelinids
- Order: Poales
- Family: Poaceae
- Subfamily: Pooideae
- Genus: Poa
- Species: P. drummondiana

Binomial name
- Poa drummondiana Nees

Synonyms
- Poa brizochloa F.Muell.; Poa cognata Steud.; Poa nodosa Nees

= Poa drummondiana =

Species of grass

Poa drummondiana is a perennial herb in the Poaceae family.

== Distribution ==
Poa drummondiana (common name - Knotted poa) is found in Western Australia, South Australia and Victoria.

== Taxonomy ==
It was first described in 1843 by Nees von Esenbeck, from a specimen collected by James Drummond on the Swan River.
