= Poa ammophila =

Scientific classification
- Kingdom: Plantae
- Clade: Tracheophytes
- Clade: Angiosperms
- Clade: Monocots
- Clade: Commelinids
- Order: Poales
- Family: Poaceae
- Subfamily: Pooideae
- Genus: Poa
- Species: P. ammophila

Binomial name
- Poa ammophila A.E.Porsild

Species of grass

Poa ammophila, also known by the common name sand bluegrass, is a species of grass in the Pooideae subfamily and Poa genus. It is endemic to the delta region of the Mackenzie River in the Northwest Territories and Yukon territories of Canada. It occurs mainly above the tree line and can grow up to about 1 foot tall, blooming in July and August. It is currently classified as vulnerable.
