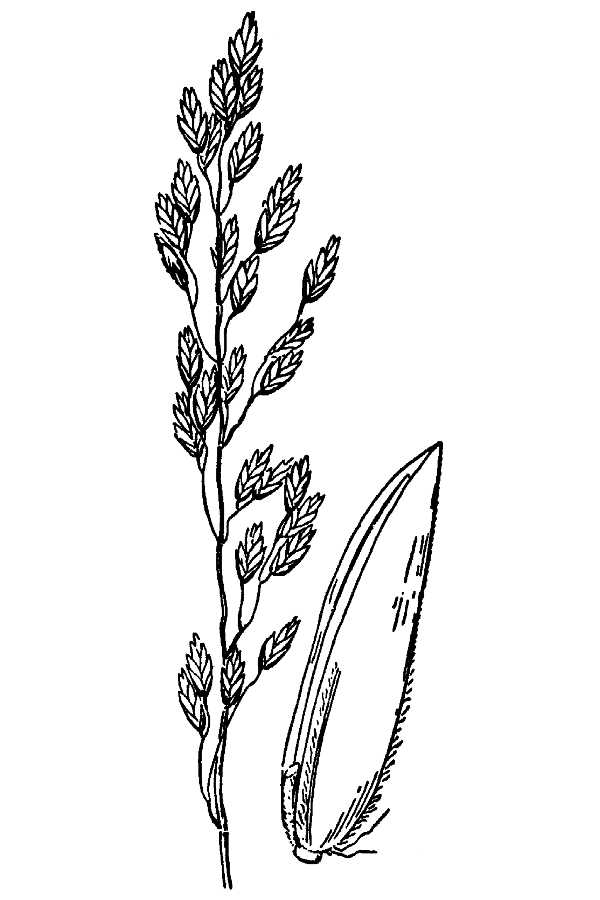

Scientific classification
- Kingdom: Plantae
- Clade: Tracheophytes
- Clade: Angiosperms
- Clade: Monocots
- Clade: Commelinids
- Order: Poales
- Family: Poaceae
- Subfamily: Pooideae
- Genus: Poa
- Species: P. glauca

Binomial name
- Poa glauca Vahl

Synonyms
- Paneion glaucum (Vahl) Lunell; Poa caesia subsp. glauca (Vahl) Hartm.; Poa caesia var. glauca (Vahl) Hartm.; Poa nemoralis var. glauca (Vahl) Gaudin; Poa nemoralis proles glauca (Vahl) Asch. & Graebn.; Poa nemoralis subsp. glauca (Vahl) Gaudin

= Poa glauca =

Species of grass

Poa glauca is a species of grass known by the common names glaucous bluegrass, glaucous meadow-grass and white bluegrass. It has a circumboreal distribution, occurring throughout the northern regions of the Northern Hemisphere. It is also known from Patagonia. It is a common grass, occurring in Arctic and alpine climates and other areas. It can be found throughout the Canadian Arctic Archipelago in many types of habitat, including disturbed and barren areas.

This is a perennial bunchgrass growing small, dense clumps of waxy leaves and stems up to about 80 centimeters in maximum height, but often remaining dwarfed, no more than 10 centimeters tall. The inflorescence is variable in appearance, growing into a short or long arrangement of thin branches bearing spikelets.
