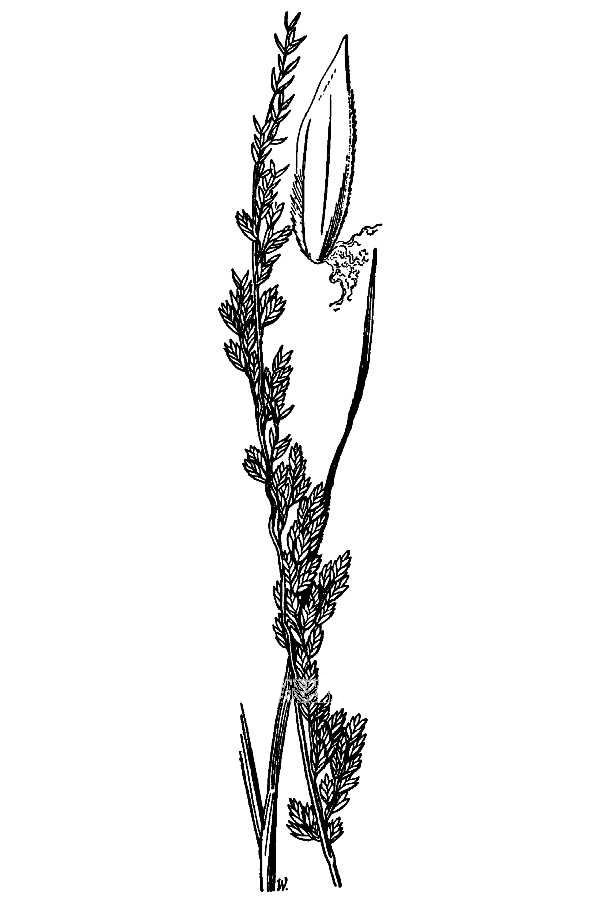

Conservation status
- Secure (NatureServe)

Scientific classification
- Kingdom: Plantae
- Clade: Embryophytes
- Clade: Tracheophytes
- Clade: Spermatophytes
- Clade: Angiosperms
- Clade: Monocots
- Clade: Commelinids
- Order: Poales
- Family: Poaceae
- Subfamily: Pooideae
- Genus: Poa
- Species: P. bigelovii

Binomial name
- Poa bigelovii Vasey & Scribn.

Synonyms
- Poa annua var. stricta Vasey

= Poa bigelovii =

Species of grass

Poa bigelovii is a species of grass known by the common name Bigelow's bluegrass. It is native to the southwestern United States and northwestern Mexico, where it grows in shady spots in desert and plateau habitat.

It is an annual bunchgrass growing in small clumps up to 40 centimeters tall. The inflorescence is a narrow, compact, cylindrical series of hairy spikelets. The spikelets sometimes have a curly tuft of hairs or cobwebby fibers near their bases.
