= Poa humilis =

Scientific classification
- Kingdom: Plantae
- Clade: Tracheophytes
- Clade: Angiosperms
- Clade: Monocots
- Clade: Commelinids
- Order: Poales
- Family: Poaceae
- Subfamily: Pooideae
- Genus: Poa
- Species: P. humilis

Binomial name
- Poa humilis Ehrh. ex Hoffm.

Species of grass

Poa humilis is a species of flowering plant belonging to the family Poaceae.

Its native range is Europe.
