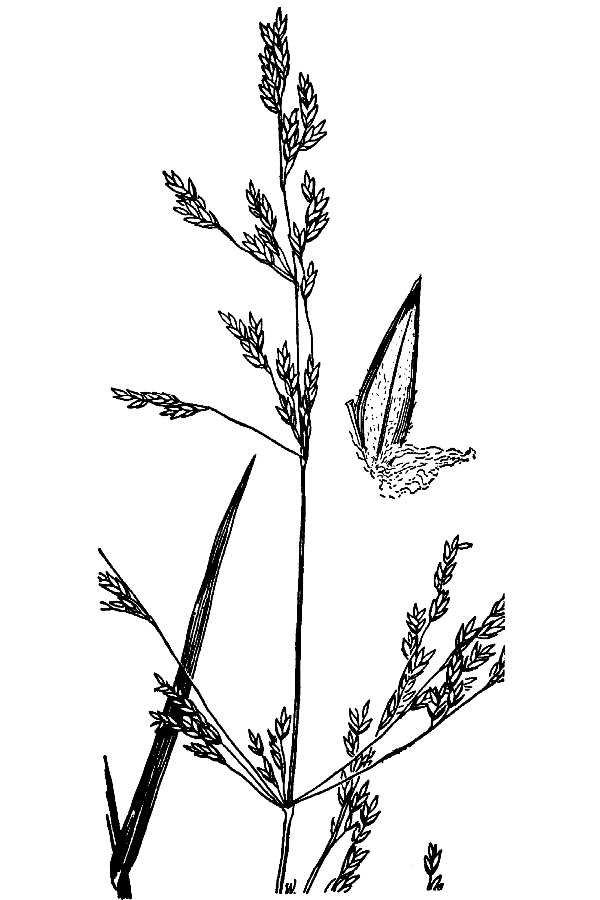

Scientific classification
- Kingdom: Plantae
- Clade: Tracheophytes
- Clade: Angiosperms
- Clade: Monocots
- Clade: Commelinids
- Order: Poales
- Family: Poaceae
- Subfamily: Pooideae
- Genus: Poa
- Species: P. howellii

Binomial name
- Poa howellii Vasey & Scribn.

= Poa howellii =

Species of grass

Poa howellii is a species of grass known by the common name Howell's bluegrass.

It is native to western North America from British Columbia to throughout California. It grows in rocky areas in woodlands and chaparral, as well as disturbed areas.

== Description ==
Poa howellii is an annual bunchgrass growing in dense, narrow tufts up to 80 centimeters tall.

The inflorescence is a series of whorls of branches bearing spikelets, the branches growing appressed to the stem and then spreading out from the stem as the spikelets mature.
