= Poa novarae =

Scientific classification
- Kingdom: Plantae
- Clade: Tracheophytes
- Clade: Angiosperms
- Clade: Monocots
- Clade: Commelinids
- Order: Poales
- Family: Poaceae
- Subfamily: Pooideae
- Genus: Poa
- Species: P. novarae

Binomial name
- Poa novarae Reichardt

Species of grass

Poa novarae is a species of flowering plant in the family Poaceae (grasses), native to Saint Paul Island. It was first described by Heinrich Wilhelm Reichardt in 1871.
