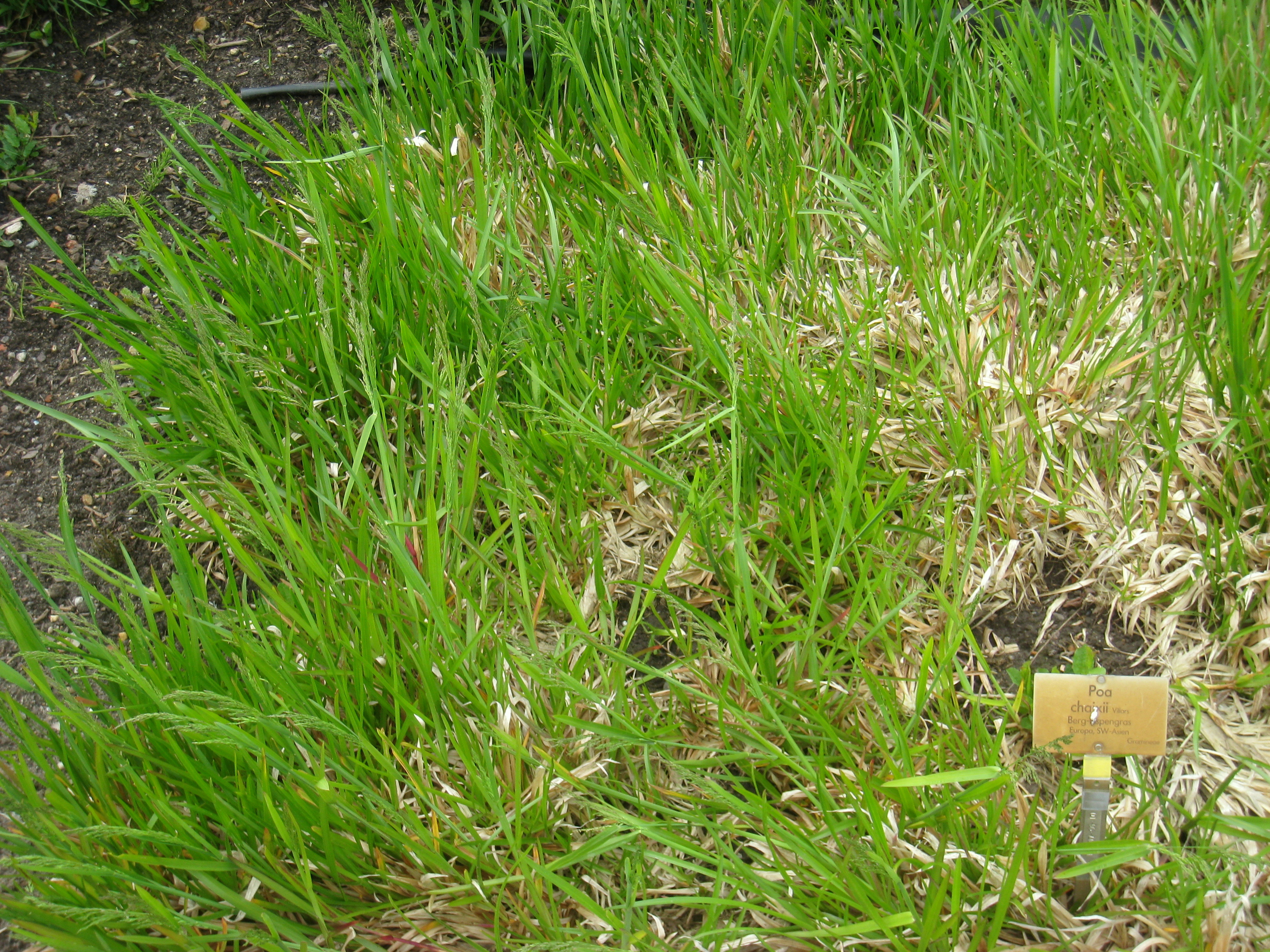

Scientific classification
- Kingdom: Plantae
- Clade: Tracheophytes
- Clade: Angiosperms
- Clade: Monocots
- Clade: Commelinids
- Order: Poales
- Family: Poaceae
- Subfamily: Pooideae
- Genus: Poa
- Species: P. chaixii

Binomial name
- Poa chaixii Vill.

= Poa chaixii =

Species of grass

Poa chaixii, known as broad-leaved meadow-grass or broadleaf bluegrass, is a species of perennial grass native to Europe and temperate Asia. Its culms are erect or ascending, ranging from 60–120 centimetres (24–47 in) long, with leaf-blades flat or conduplicate, from 15–45 centimetres (5.9–17.7 in) long by 5–10 millimetres (0.20–0.39 in) wide.
