= Poa siphonoglossa =

Conservation status
- Critically Endangered (IUCN 3.1)

- Critically Imperiled (NatureServe)

Scientific classification
- Kingdom: Plantae
- Clade: Tracheophytes
- Clade: Angiosperms
- Clade: Monocots
- Clade: Commelinids
- Order: Poales
- Family: Poaceae
- Subfamily: Pooideae
- Genus: Poa
- Species: P. siphonoglossa

Binomial name
- Poa siphonoglossa (Reichardt) Hitchc.

Species of grass

Poa siphonoglossa is a rare species of grass known by the common names Kauai bluegrass and island bluegrass. It is endemic to Hawaii, where it is limited to the island of Kauai. It is threatened by the loss and modification of its habitat. It is a federally listed endangered species of the United States.

There are three species of Poa native to Hawaii, and all are endemic to Kauai. As of 1995, there were five populations of this species totalling about 50 individuals. The plant grows on moist, shady slopes.

This is a perennial grass growing in tufts. The stems lose their leaves early and then resemble naked, erect rushes.

This grass is threatened by deer, feral goats and pigs damaging its habitat, and the invasion of introduced species of plants.
