= Poa sandvicensis =

Conservation status
- Critically Endangered (IUCN 3.1)

- Critically Imperiled (NatureServe)

Scientific classification
- Kingdom: Plantae
- Clade: Tracheophytes
- Clade: Angiosperms
- Clade: Monocots
- Clade: Commelinids
- Order: Poales
- Family: Poaceae
- Subfamily: Pooideae
- Genus: Poa
- Species: P. sandvicensis

Binomial name
- Poa sandvicensis (Reichardt) Hitchc.

Species of grass

Poa sandvicensis is a rare species of grass known by the common name Hawaiian bluegrass. It is endemic to Hawaii, where it is limited to the island of Kauai. It is threatened by the loss and modification of its habitat. It is a federally listed endangered species of the United States.

There are three species of Poa native to Hawaii, and they are all endemic to Kauai. As of 2003, there were nine populations with fluctuating numbers of individuals. The plant grows on moist, shady slopes.

This grass is threatened by feral goats and pigs damaging its habitat, and the invasion of introduced species of plants.
