= Poa kunthii =

Conservation status
- Data Deficient (IUCN 3.1)

Scientific classification
- Kingdom: Plantae
- Clade: Tracheophytes
- Clade: Angiosperms
- Clade: Monocots
- Clade: Commelinids
- Order: Poales
- Family: Poaceae
- Subfamily: Pooideae
- Genus: Poa
- Species: P. kunthii

Binomial name
- Poa kunthii Lindm.

Species of grass

Poa kunthii is a species of grass endemic to Ecuador.
