= Poa morrisii =

Scientific classification
- Kingdom: Plantae
- Clade: Tracheophytes
- Clade: Angiosperms
- Clade: Monocots
- Clade: Commelinids
- Order: Poales
- Family: Poaceae
- Subfamily: Pooideae
- Genus: Poa
- Species: P. morrisii

Binomial name
- Poa morrisii Vickery

Species of plant

Poa morrisii, commonly known as soft tussock-grass is a species of tussock grass that is endemic to Australia.

The species was formally described in 1970 by Australian botanist Joyce Winifred Vickery based on plant material collected in Sandringham, Victoria by P. Morris in 1939.
