= Poa diaboli =

Conservation status
- Imperiled (NatureServe)

Scientific classification
- Kingdom: Plantae
- Clade: Embryophytes
- Clade: Tracheophytes
- Clade: Spermatophytes
- Clade: Angiosperms
- Clade: Monocots
- Clade: Commelinids
- Order: Poales
- Family: Poaceae
- Subfamily: Pooideae
- Genus: Poa
- Species: P. diaboli

Binomial name
- Poa diaboli Soreng & Keil

Species of grass

Poa diaboli is a rare species of grass known by the common name Diablo Canyon bluegrass. It is endemic to San Luis Obispo County, California, where it is known from about five occurrences in the San Luis Mountains near the coast. The type specimen was collected in Montaña de Oro State Park and the grass was described as a new species in 2003. The grass occurs on rugged mountaintops and north-facing slopes in thin soils covering shale rock within a few kilometers of the coastline. Its habitat includes chaparral, oak woodland, coastal sage scrub, and Bishop pine forest.

This species is a rhizomatous or stoloniferous perennial grass growing in mounds with stems up to half a meter tall. The inflorescence is a panicle of flowers up to 10 centimeters long with upright or spreading branches. It flowers in March and April, the spikelets green with webby fibers.

This grass was found to exhibit "sequentially-adjusted gynomonoecism", a unique breeding system or intermediate between breeding systems. The species is dioecious, with male and female flowers occurring on separate individuals, but there sometimes occur female plants that have some bisexual flowers, with working male and female parts, a syndrome called gynomonoecism. Whereas most plants that experience gynomonoecism have a fixed ratio of female and bisexual flowers throughout the season, this particular grass shifts its ratio, at times producing more bisexual flowers.

Threats to this rare species include the invasion of non-native grasses, such as purple veldtgrass (Ehrharta calycina).
