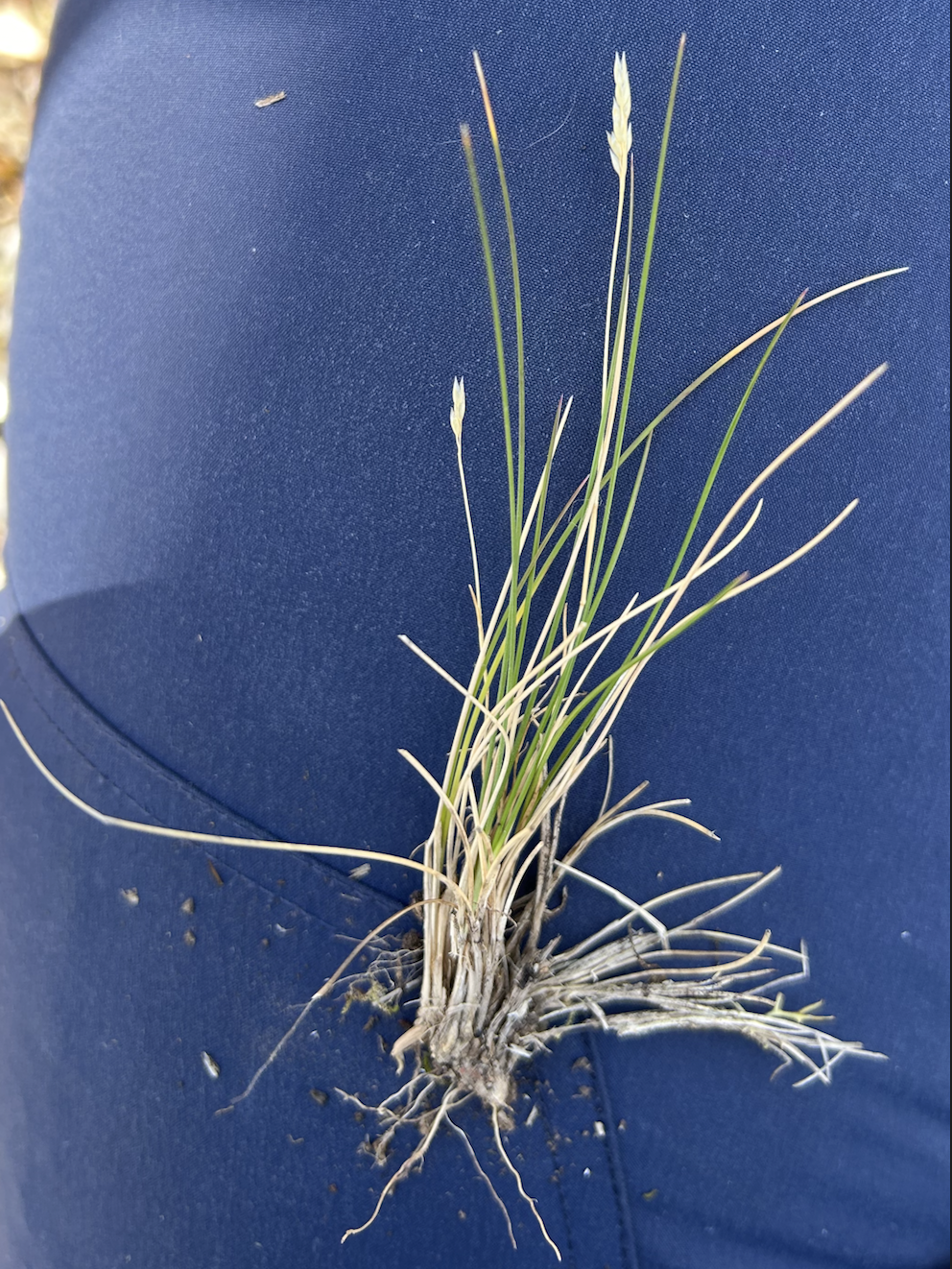

Scientific classification
- Kingdom: Plantae
- Clade: Tracheophytes
- Clade: Angiosperms
- Clade: Monocots
- Clade: Commelinids
- Order: Poales
- Family: Poaceae
- Subfamily: Pooideae
- Genus: Poa
- Species: P. clivicola

Binomial name
- Poa clivicola Vickery 1970

= Poa clivicola =

Species of grass

Poa clivicola, commonly known as fine-leaved snow grass, is an endangered Australian grass species, restricted to alpine grassy vegetation. Poa from the Greek poa (grass), clivicola- from the Latin clivus (hill) and -cola (dweller).

== Description ==
Poa clivicola is a perennial, tufted, tussock grass, growing up to 60cm tall. Leaf sheaths are bleached at the base, herbaceous, pallid, and glabrous. Leaves are tightly in-rolled, tough to the touch, and very fine at 0.2-0.4mm wide. Leaves are mostly basal. Leaf-sheaths can be smooth or scaberulous and glabrous on surface. Ligules are 0.5-1.5mm long, truncate and firm. Panicles are open and pyramidal. Lemmas are 3-4mm long, hairless or with sparse localised hairs.

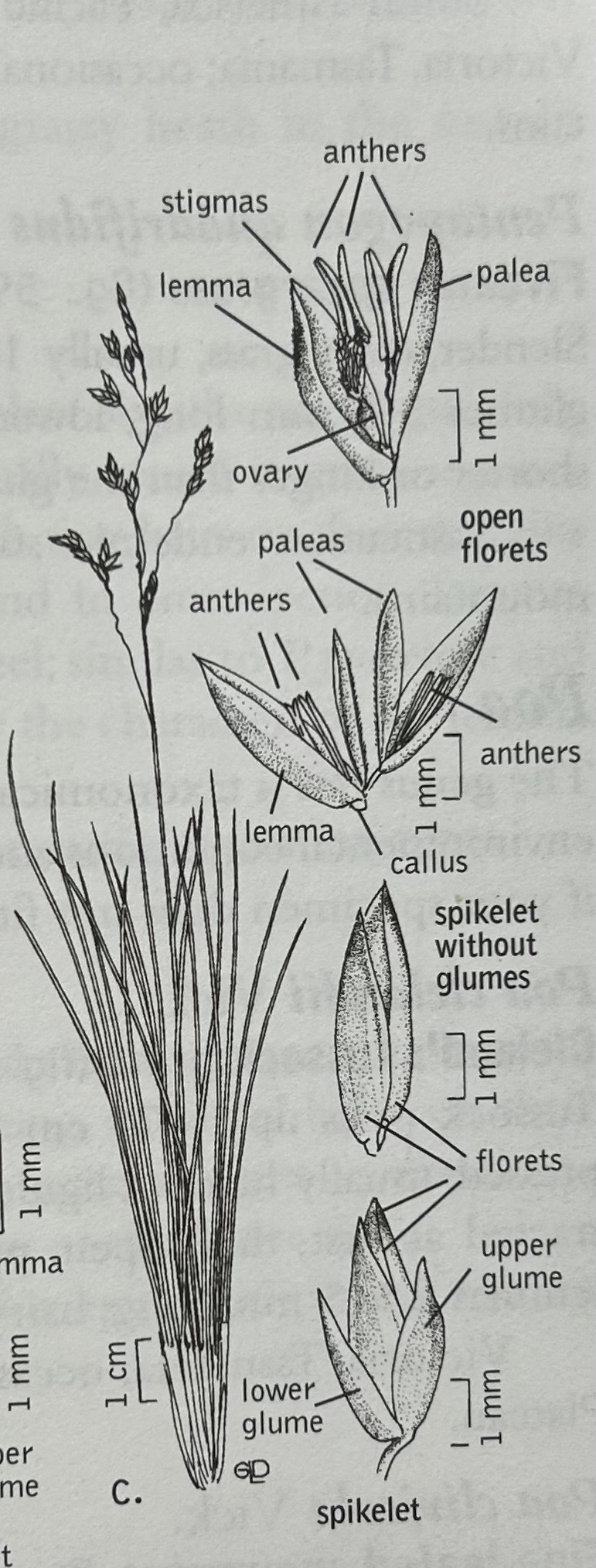
Illustration of Poa clivicola from "Alpine Tasmania: an illustrated guide to the flora and vegetation"

== Distribution and habitat ==
Endemic to Australia, P. clivicola grows well on better drained grassland slopes in Australia's alpine regions. Occurring from approximately 800m to 2000m altitude. This species is found rarely across, Victoria, New South Wales, Tasmania, and Australian Capital Territory, in grassy mountainous vegetation. Particularly well growing on basaltic soils and not occurring on siliceous rocks. Can be found in open eucalypt woodland, swampy plain, open grassland, and frost hollows, usually in wet sites.

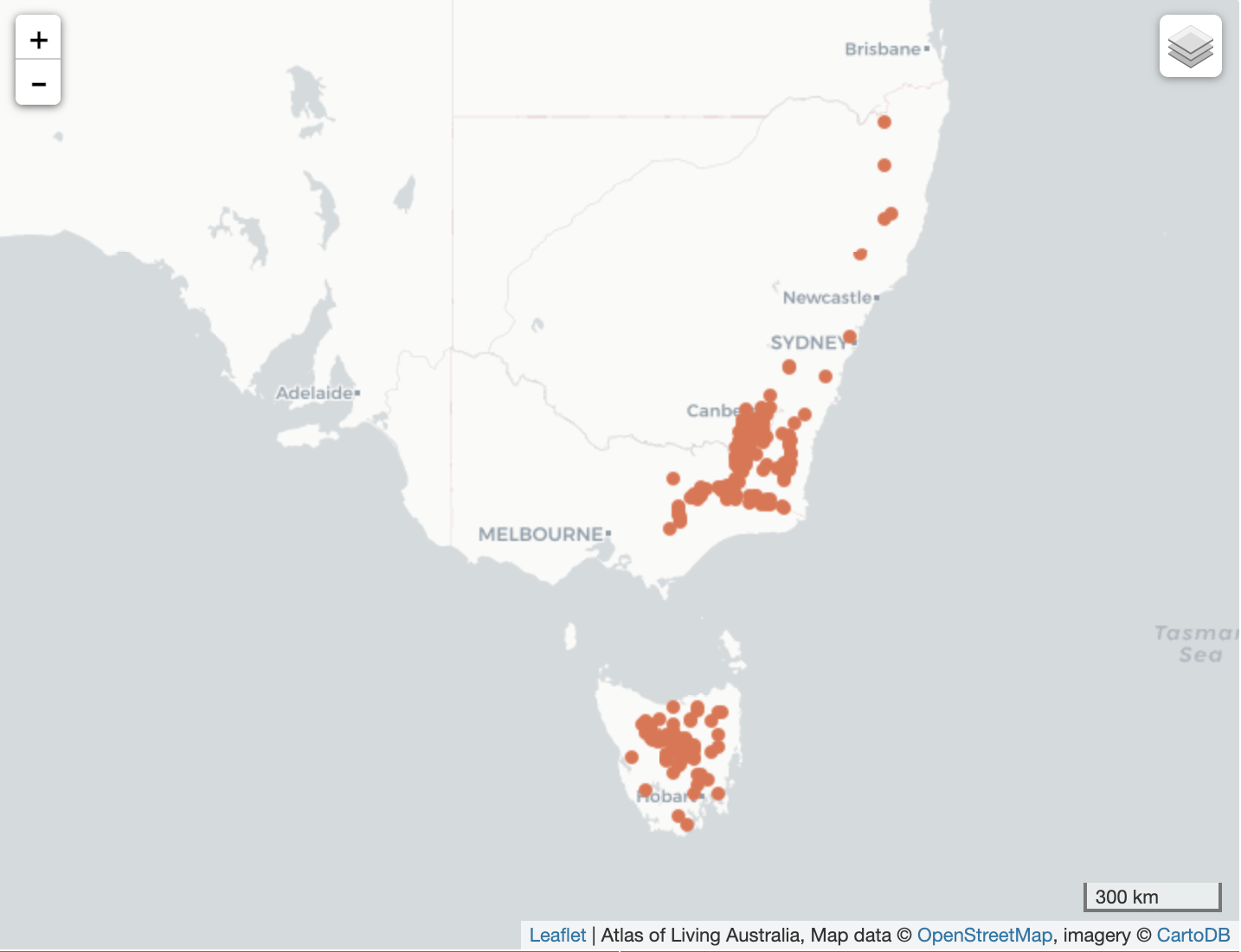
Distribution of Poa clivicola from Atlas of Living Australia

== Uses ==
The genus of Poa comprises important pasture plants, making P. clivicola a good provider of food for native wildlife in alpine grassy vegetation. Poa grasslands also provide important habitat for native fauna species, especially for endangered and endemic butterfly species that feed only on the leaves of Poa grass.

== Threats and conservation ==
Poa clivicola is listed as endangered by the State of Victoria. Climate change is a big threat to the conservation of this species as it occurs rarely and only in alpine areas. This species will be affected by both changing temperatures affecting climatic conditions on mountain tops and also shrub encroachment with these warm temperatures increasing the possible range for tree and shrub species to outcompete it. The small number of grass specialists in Australia and the limited knowledge behind unique features of individual Poa species means there is great uncertainty when distinguishing between them. This makes it hard to know what particular things might be changing distributions and numbers of P. clivicola without removing specimens for further investigation.
