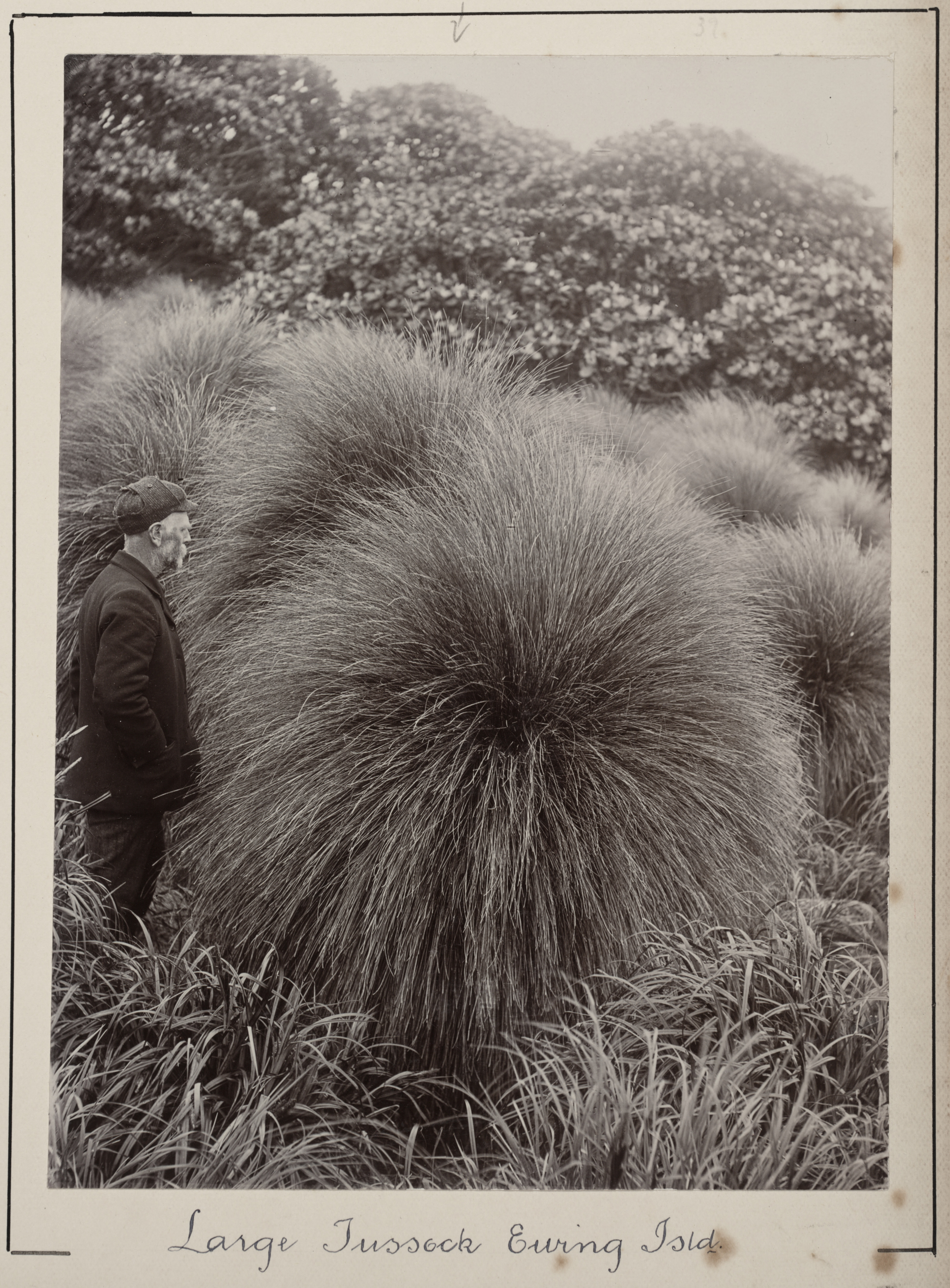
- Botanist Leonard Cockayne with Poa litorosa on Ewing Island, November 1907

Conservation status
- Naturally Uncommon (NZ TCS)

Scientific classification
- Kingdom: Plantae
- Clade: Tracheophytes
- Clade: Angiosperms
- Clade: Monocots
- Clade: Commelinids
- Order: Poales
- Family: Poaceae
- Subfamily: Pooideae
- Genus: Poa
- Species: P. litorosa

Binomial name
- Poa litorosa Cheeseman, 1906

Synonyms
- Festuca scoparia Hook.f.

= Poa litorosa =

Species of grass

Poa litorosa is a species of tussock grass that is native to the subantarctic islands of New Zealand and Australia. The specific epithet litorosa comes from the Latin litoralis (“pertaining to the seashore”).

== Description ==
Poa litorosa is a perennial grass, growing in straw-coloured, wiry tussocks up to 60 cm in height. It is closely related to Poa cita (silver tussock) of New Zealand and is native to New Zealand's Antipodes, Auckland and Campbell Islands as well as to Australia's Macquarie Island.
