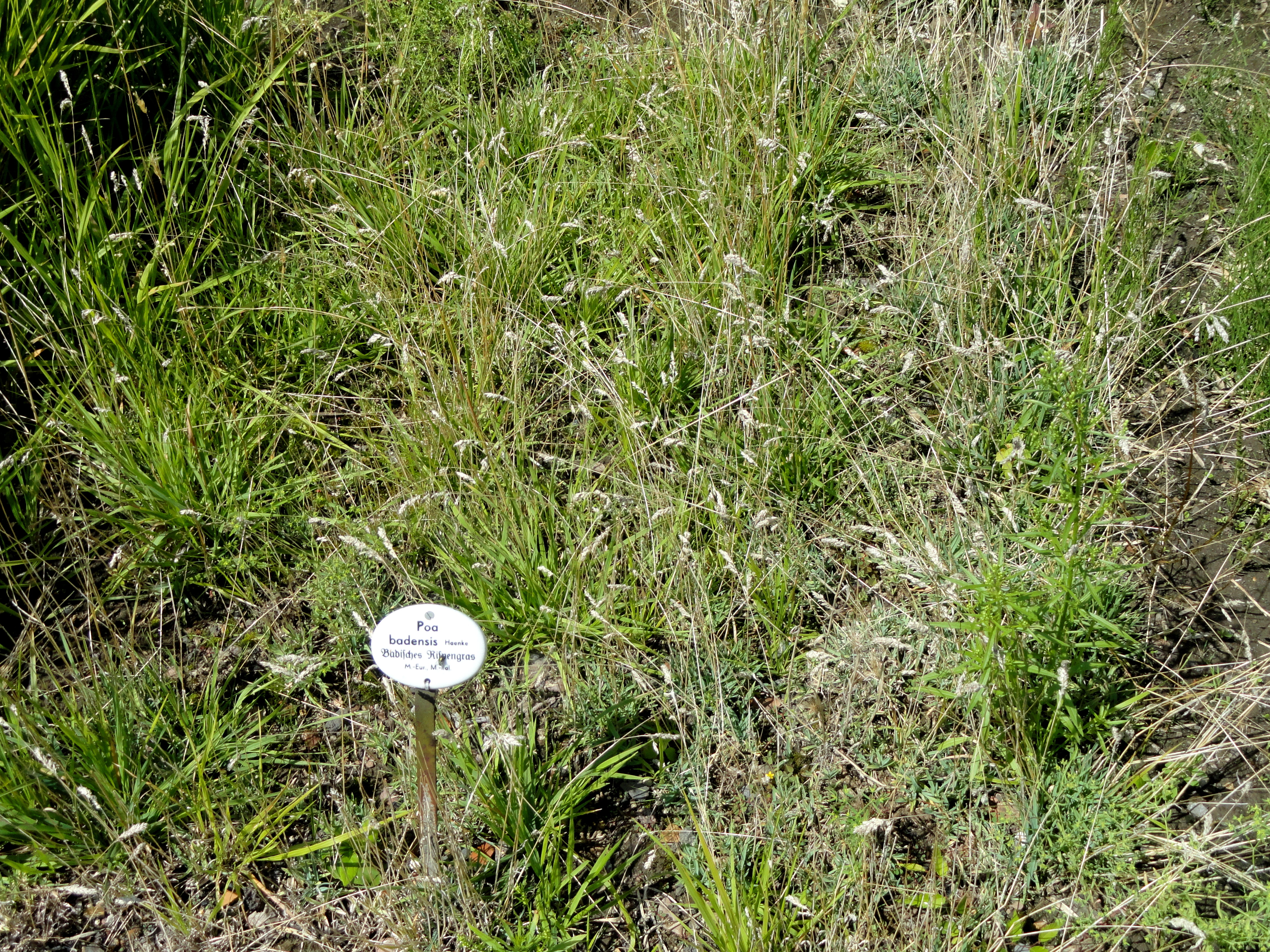
- At the University of Frankfurt botanical garden
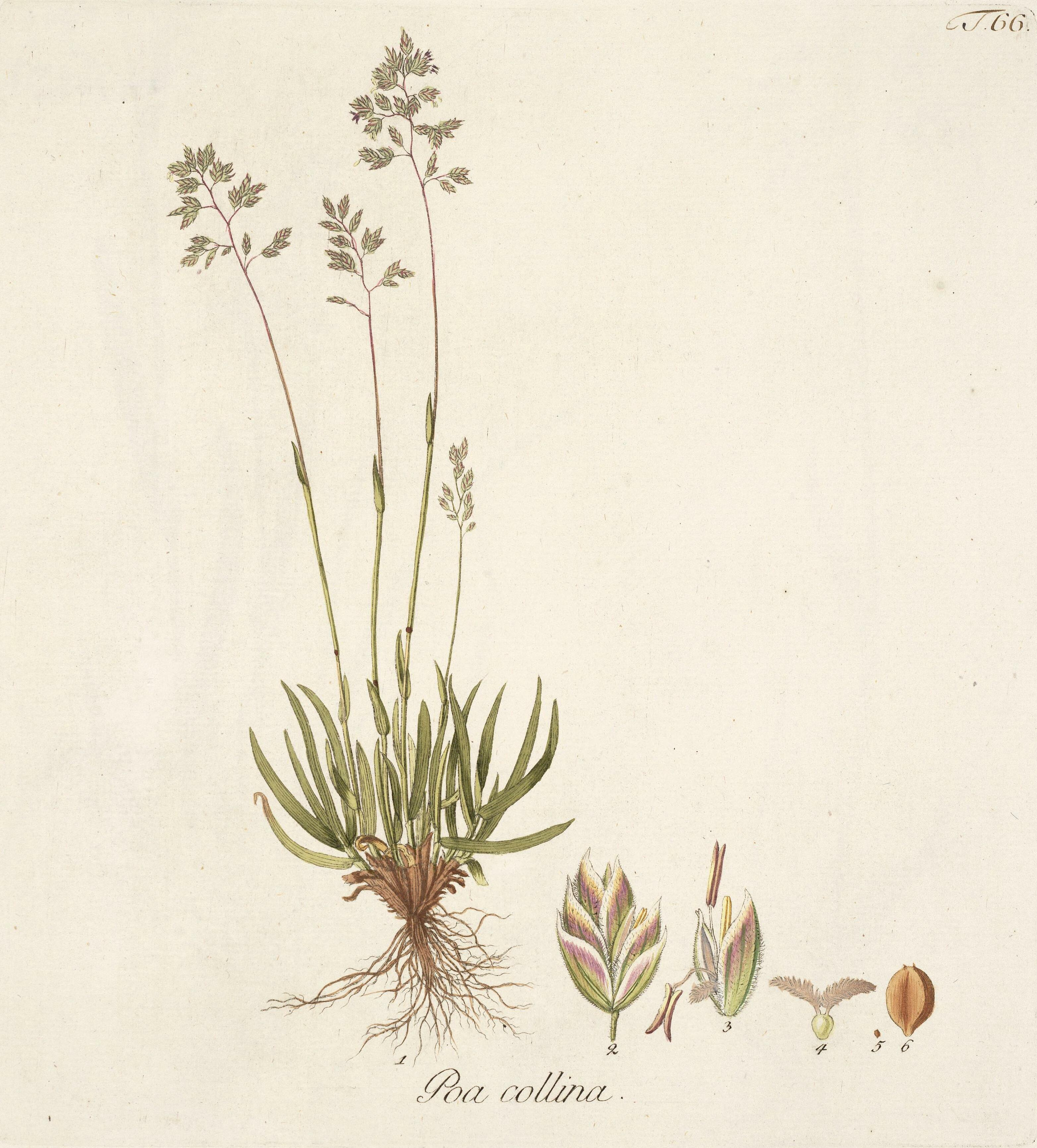
- Botanical illustration

Scientific classification
- Kingdom: Plantae
- Clade: Tracheophytes
- Clade: Angiosperms
- Clade: Monocots
- Clade: Commelinids
- Order: Poales
- Family: Poaceae
- Subfamily: Pooideae
- Genus: Poa
- Species: P. badensis

Binomial name
- Poa badensis Haenke ex Willd.

Synonyms
- List: Poa alpina f. badensis (Haenke ex Willd.) Döll; Poa alpina proles badensis (Haenke) Rouy; Poa alpina subsp. badensis (Haenke ex Willd.) Arcang.; Poa alpina var. badensis (Haenke ex Willd.) Wallr.; Poa alpina var. brevifolia G.Mey.; Poa alpina var. brevifolia (DC.) Godr.; Poa alpina var. collina Wahlenb.; Poa alpina var. minor Schrad.; Poa alpina var. multiflora Gaudin; Poa badensis var. imeretica (Sommier & Levier) Tzvelev; Poa badensis subsp. multiflora (Gaudin) Rivas Mart.; Poa badensis var. multiflora (Gaudin) Kerguélen; Poa badensis var. nabelekii Podp.; Poa brevifolia DC.; Poa cenisia var. badensis (Haenke ex Willd.) Rchb.; Poa collina Host; Poa imeretica Sommier & Levier; Poa koeleri DC.; Poa thermalis Pers.; Poa trivialis var. koeleri (DC.) Steud.

= Poa badensis =

Species of grass

Poa badensis is a species of grass (family Poaceae), native to central and southeastern Europe, and the Caucasus region. It is a relict species of a calcareous rock/sand steppe type now rare in Europe.
