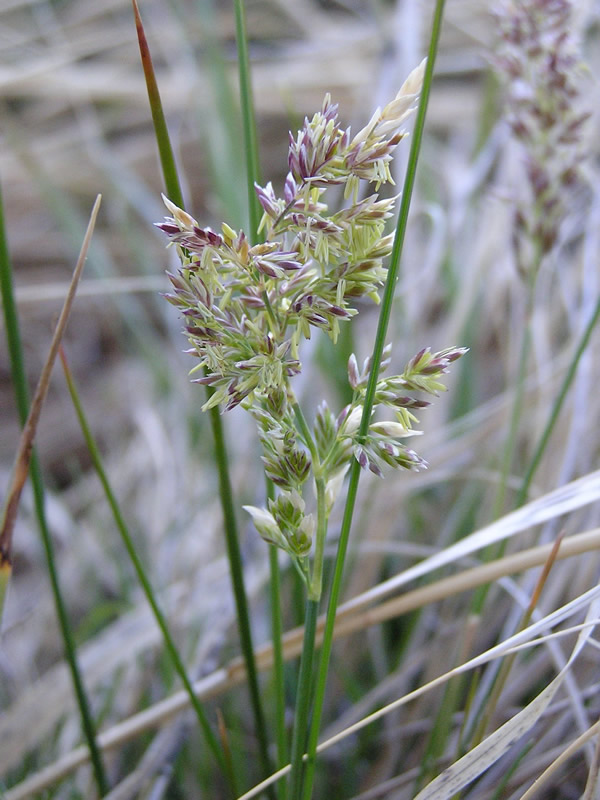

Conservation status
- Endangered (ESA)

Scientific classification
- Kingdom: Plantae
- Clade: Tracheophytes
- Clade: Angiosperms
- Clade: Monocots
- Clade: Commelinids
- Order: Poales
- Family: Poaceae
- Subfamily: Pooideae
- Genus: Poa
- Species: P. atropurpurea

Binomial name
- Poa atropurpurea Scribn.

= Poa atropurpurea =

Species of grass

Poa atropurpurea is a rare species of grass known by the common name San Bernardino bluegrass. It is endemic to southern California, where it is known from two regions, the San Bernardino Mountains near Big Bear and the Laguna Mountains of San Diego County.

== Description ==
It grows in wet mountain meadows. It is a rhizomatous perennial grass growing in small, loose tufts up to about half a meter tall. The firm, narrow leaves often have rolled or folded edges. It is a dioecious plant, with male and female individuals bearing different flower types. The inflorescence is somewhat lance-shaped, with branches appressed, spreading upwards along the stem axis. Male and female inflorescences look similar. They may hold up to 70 spikelets each, which are purplish in color.

== Habitat ==
In the San Bernardino Mountains the grass occurs in the pebble plain habitat near Big Bear with other rare plant species. In San Diego County the grass has been observed on Palomar Mountain and in the meadows of Mount Laguna. There are fewer than twenty populations of this grass in existence and it is a federally listed endangered species of the United States.

This species faces a number of threats, including the degradation of its meadow habitat by off-road vehicles and construction at the Big Bear airport and ski areas. Certain populations have been observed to contain only female individuals. Other threats include grazing of cattle and trampling.
