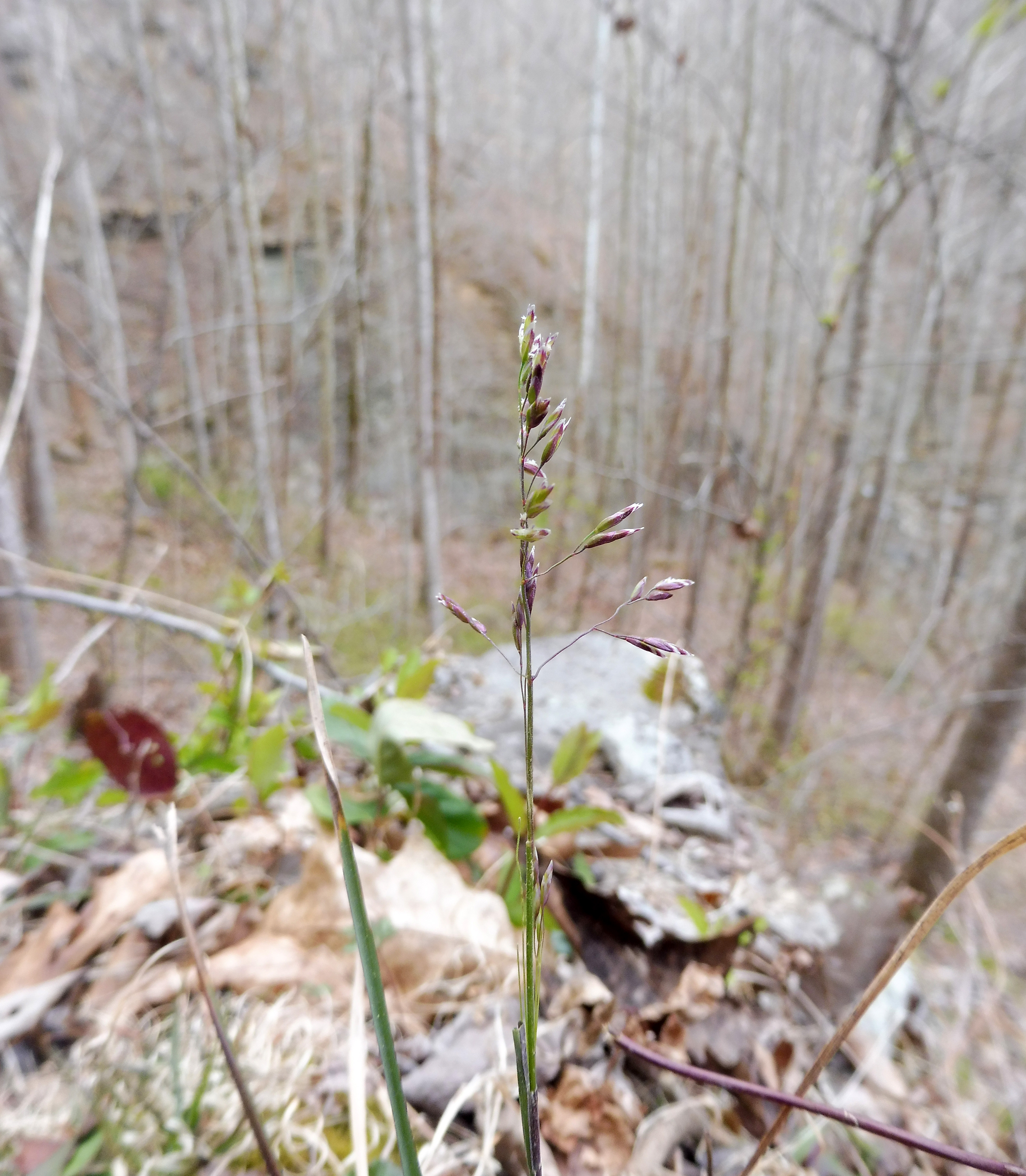

Scientific classification
- Kingdom: Plantae
- Clade: Tracheophytes
- Clade: Angiosperms
- Clade: Monocots
- Clade: Commelinids
- Order: Poales
- Family: Poaceae
- Subfamily: Pooideae
- Genus: Poa
- Section: Poa sect. Madropoa
- Species: P. cuspidata

Binomial name
- Poa cuspidata Nutt.

Synonyms
- Aira triflora Elliott; Graphephorum elliottii Kunth; Graphephorum melicoides var. triflorum (Elliott) Alph.Wood; Poa brachyphylla Schult.; Poa brevifolia Muhl.; Poa pungens Nutt.; Poa trinervata Willd. ex Muhl.; Triodia greenii Spreng.

= Poa cuspidata =

Species of grass

Poa cuspidata, commonly called early bluegrass, is a species of flowering plant in the grass family (Poaceae). It is native to the eastern United States, where its range extends from Appalachian regions into the Coastal Plain, where it is less common. In the Appalachian mountains, it is a common species found in forest openings.

Poa cuspidata derives its common name from its early flowering period, which begins in March with the very first spring wildflowers. Within its range, other Poa generally bloom later in the spring season.

== Description ==
Poa cuspidata is a rhizomatous perennial. Its culms are loosely tufted and range from 3–6 dm (12–24 in) in height. Its leaf blades are 2–4 mm (0.079–0.157 in) wide and its leaf sheaths are pubescent, especially at their base. The plant has a loose and nodding panicle, with branches that bear three or four flowered spikelets.
