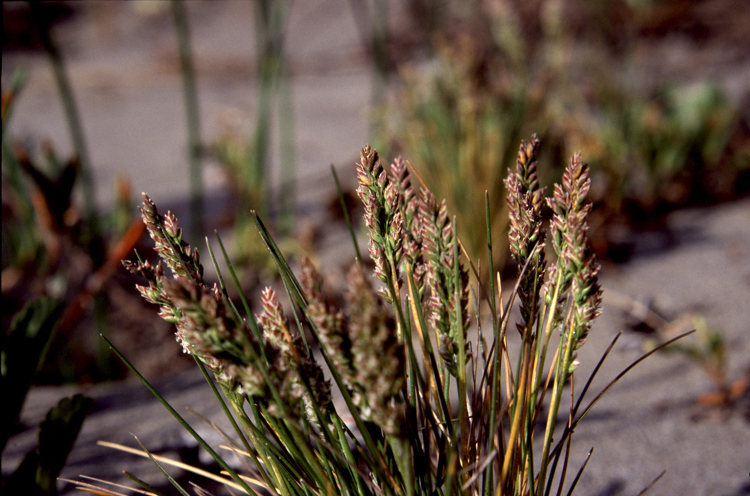

Scientific classification
- Kingdom: Plantae
- Clade: Tracheophytes
- Clade: Angiosperms
- Clade: Monocots
- Clade: Commelinids
- Order: Poales
- Family: Poaceae
- Subfamily: Pooideae
- Genus: Poa
- Species: P. confinis

Binomial name
- Poa confinis Vasey

= Poa confinis =

Species of grass

Poa confinis is a species of grass known by the common names coastline bluegrass and beach bluegrass.

== Distribution and habitat ==
It is native to the coastline of western North America from British Columbia to northern California, where it grows on beaches, dunes, and other coastal habitat.

== Description ==
Poa confinis is a perennial grass growing in small tufts with rhizomes and stolons, reaching up to about 30 centimeters tall. The narrow leaves are firm to stiff and sometimes folded or rolled along the edges. The inflorescence is a small, rough-haired, light brown cluster of spikelets. The plant is dioecious, with male and female individuals producing different types of inflorescence, the types similar in appearance.
