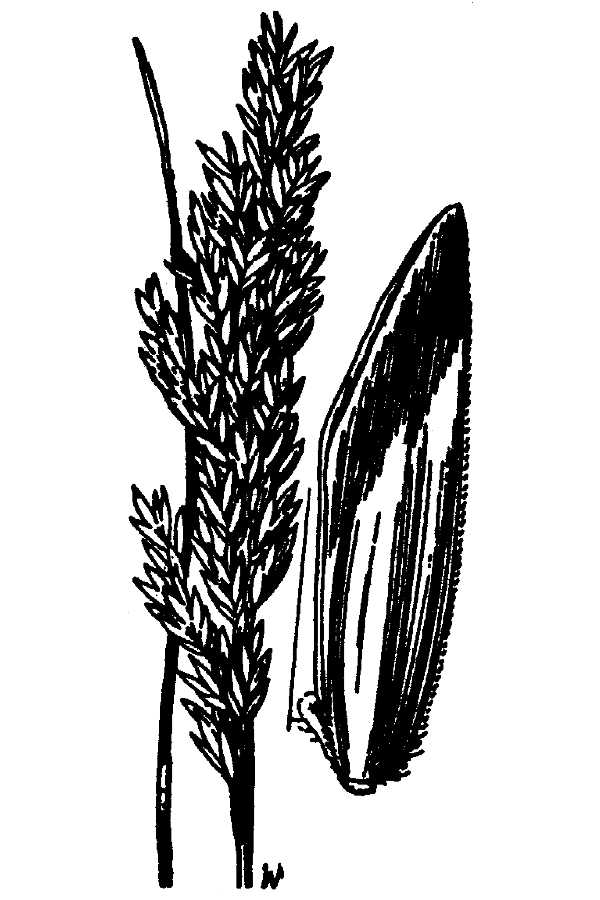

Scientific classification
- Kingdom: Plantae
- Clade: Tracheophytes
- Clade: Angiosperms
- Clade: Monocots
- Clade: Commelinids
- Order: Poales
- Family: Poaceae
- Subfamily: Pooideae
- Genus: Poa
- Species: P. unilateralis

Binomial name
- Poa unilateralis Scribn.

= Poa unilateralis =

Species of grass

Poa unilateralis is a species of grass known by the common names San Francisco bluegrass, ocean-bluff bluegrass, and sea-bluff bluegrass.

== Distribution ==
It is native to west coast of the United States from Washington to central California, where it grows in coastal habitats such as bluffs and beaches in sandy saline soils.

== Description ==
It is a perennial grass forming dense clumps of stems up to 40 centimeters tall. The herbage may be waxy in texture. The leaves may be thin and early-withering or somewhat fleshy and persistent. The inflorescence is a dense cluster of short branches bearing small, hairy-edged spikelets.
