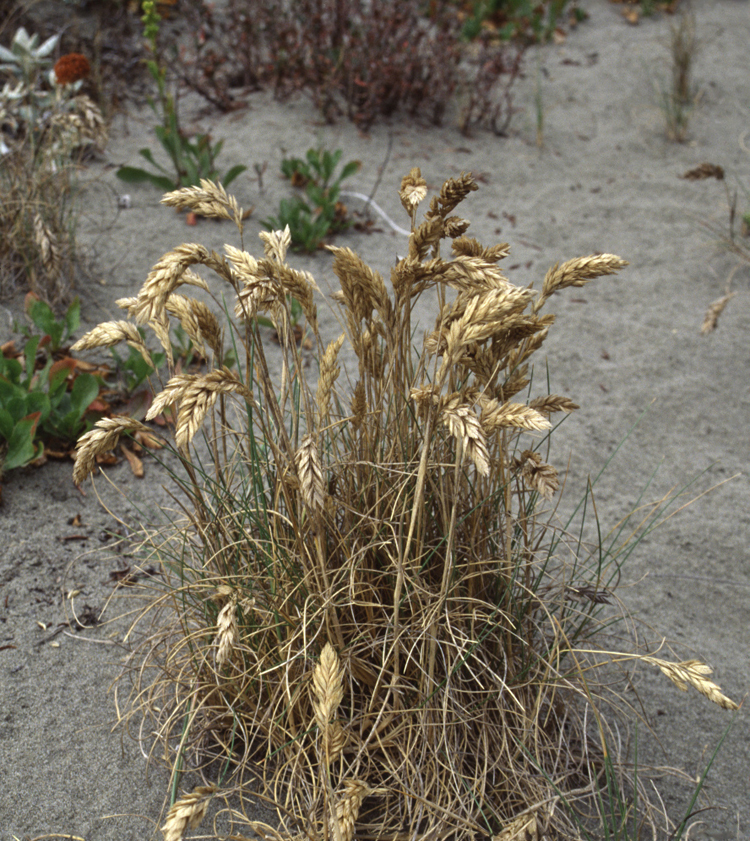

Scientific classification
- Kingdom: Plantae
- Clade: Tracheophytes
- Clade: Angiosperms
- Clade: Monocots
- Clade: Commelinids
- Order: Poales
- Family: Poaceae
- Subfamily: Pooideae
- Genus: Poa
- Species: P. macrantha

Binomial name
- Poa macrantha Vasey

= Poa macrantha =

Species of flowering plant

Poa macrantha is a species of grass known by the common names seashore bluegrass and large-flowered sand dune bluegrass. It is native to the west coast of North America from Alaska to northern California, where it grows in sand dunes and other beach habitat.

== Description ==
Poa macrantha is a perennial grass growing in loose clumps with stems up to 60 centimeters in maximum height. The grass grows from a network of very long, stout rhizomes and stolons which may be up to 4 meters in length, anchoring the grass in its shifting sandy substrate. The inflorescence is a dense series of clustered spikelets which are flattened and longer than wide. The plant is dioecious with male and female individuals bearing different types of flowers; the two flower types are similar in appearance.
