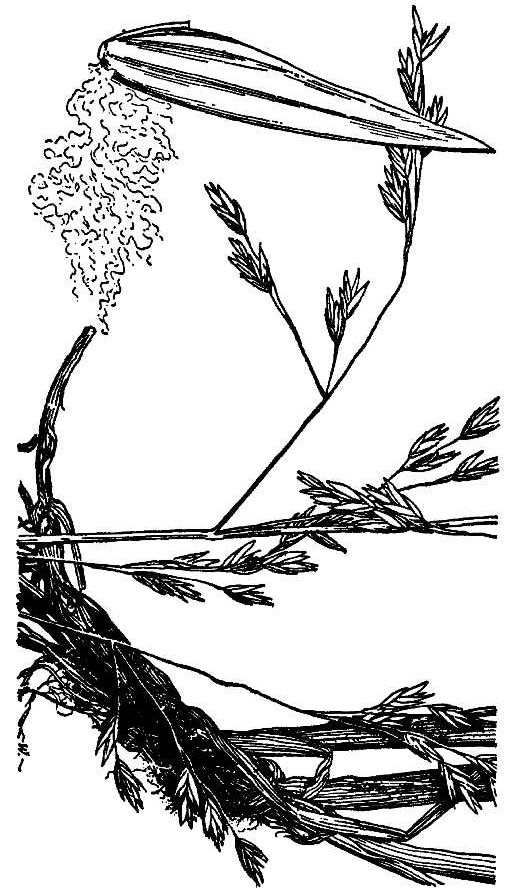

Scientific classification
- Kingdom: Plantae
- Clade: Tracheophytes
- Clade: Angiosperms
- Clade: Monocots
- Clade: Commelinids
- Order: Poales
- Family: Poaceae
- Subfamily: Pooideae
- Genus: Poa
- Species: P. kelloggii

Binomial name
- Poa kelloggii Vasey

= Poa kelloggii =

Species of grass

Poa kelloggii is a species of grass known by the common name Kellogg's bluegrass. It is endemic to the North and Central Coasts of California, where it grows in coastal forests, including redwood forests. It is a perennial grass producing single stems or loose clumps of several stems up to 85 centimeters tall. The inflorescence is a series of branches along the stem which spread out and then droop as the fruit matures. The flattened spikelets occur at the tips of the thin branches.
