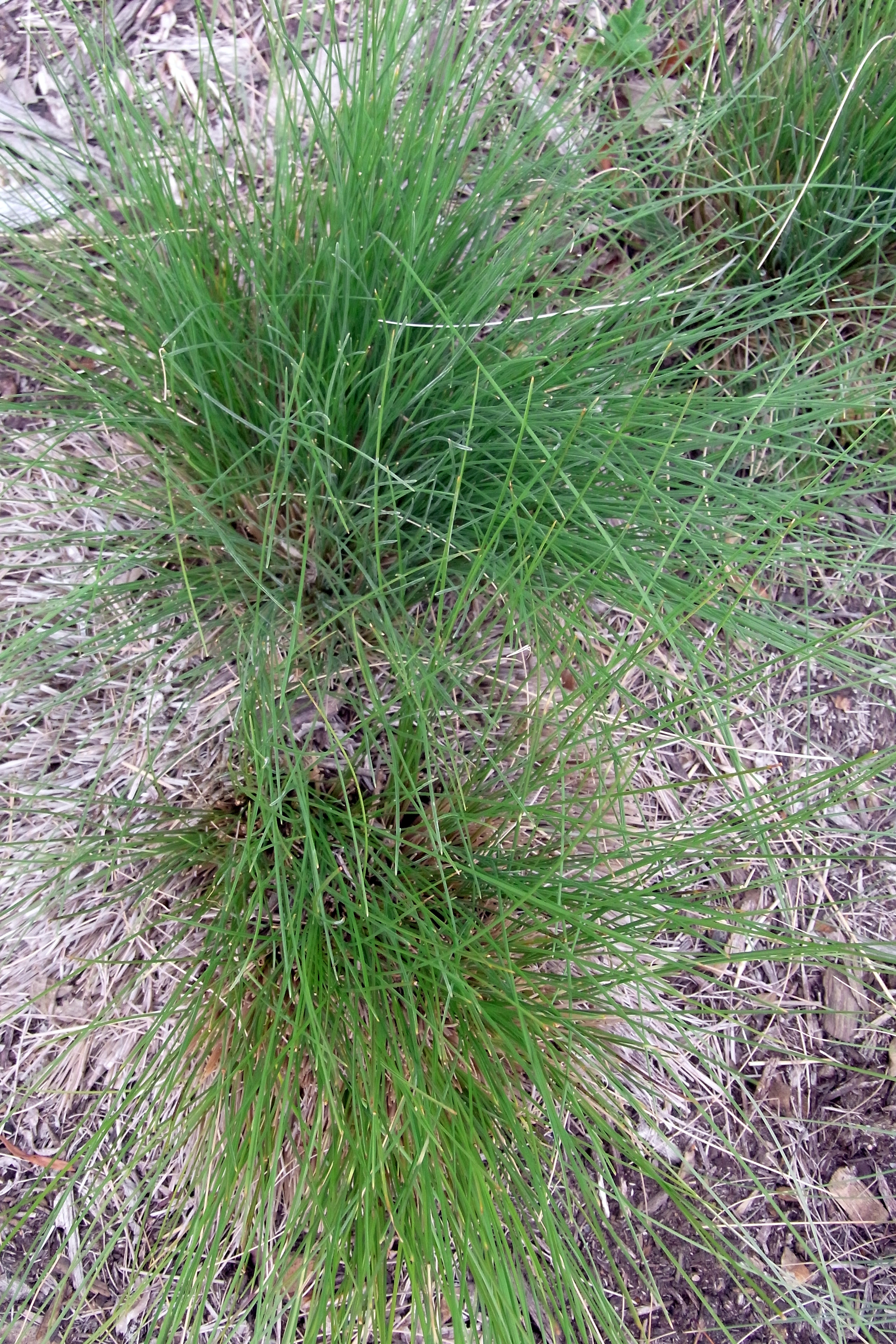

Scientific classification
- Kingdom: Plantae
- Clade: Tracheophytes
- Clade: Angiosperms
- Clade: Monocots
- Clade: Commelinids
- Order: Poales
- Family: Poaceae
- Subfamily: Pooideae
- Genus: Poa
- Species: P. rodwayi

Binomial name
- Poa rodwayi Vickery, 1970

= Poa rodwayi =

Species of grass

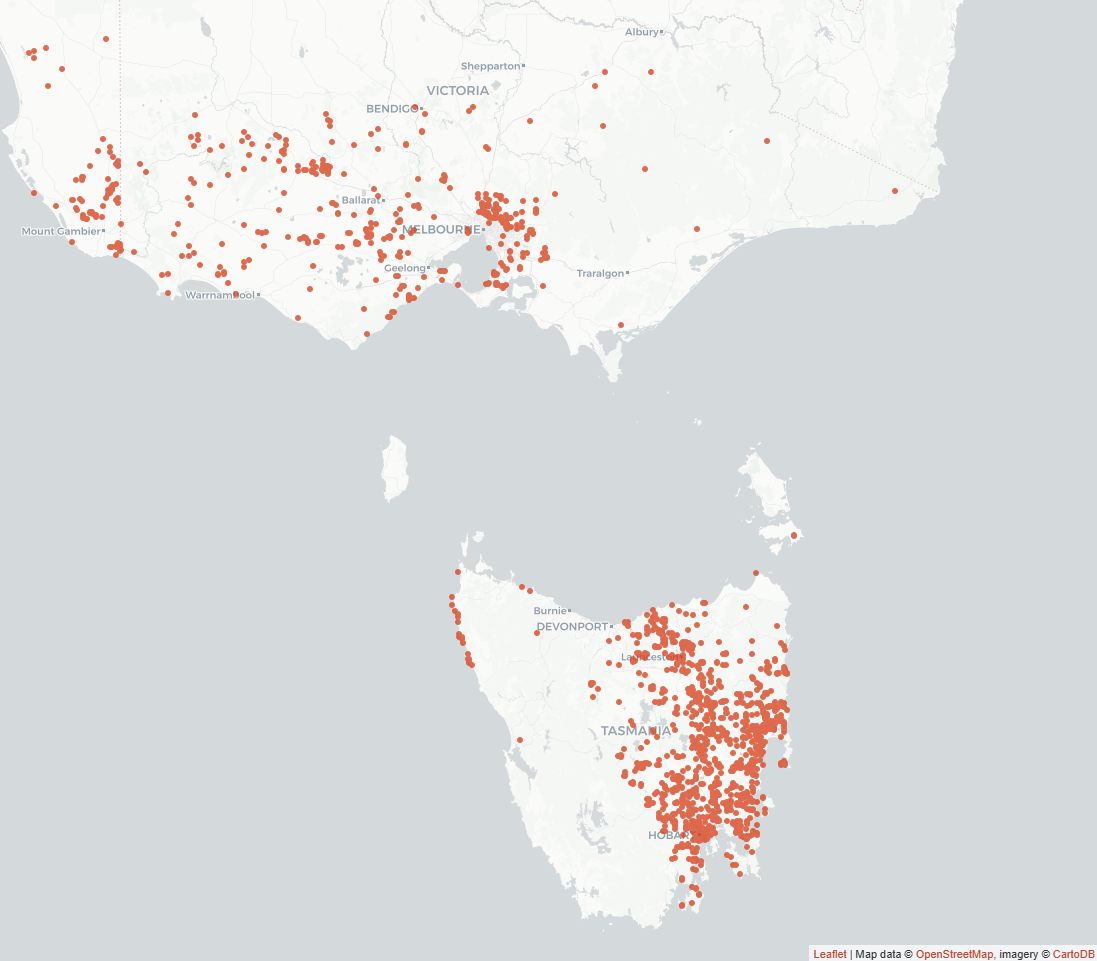
Distribution of Poa rodwayi in Australia.

Poa rodwayi, commonly known as Velvet tussock-grass, is a tussock grass endemic to southeastern Australia. It was described as a separate species in 1966 by Joyce Winifred Vickery in Contributions from the New South Wales National Herbarium. It is commonly found within dry, low-altitude grassland communities with little or no eucalypt cover. The type specimen was collected at Hobart, Tasmania.

== Description ==
Poa rodwayi is a tussock-forming cool-season perennial between 30-80 cm in height. Its leaf blades are fine and tightly inrolled, having a white-grey to grey-green hue and velvety texture due to a covering of dense, short hairs.

The flowers present as a panicle around 3-15 cm long and around 8 cm wide. Each spikelet holds 3-5 flowers that are green or purplish in hue.

== Habitat and distribution ==
Poa rodwayi is endemic to South Australia, Victoria and Tasmania, and occurs mostly in dry, lowland grassland and grassy woodland communities. In Tasmania, Poa rodwayi has been observed to either dominate or co-dominate with Themeda triandra and Rytidosperma species on shallow soils over rockplates, where eucalypts and other overstorey species are unable to survive long-term drought conditions.

As the seeds are easily dispersed by the wind, their distribution is mainly limited by competition with other plants.

== Uses ==
Poa rodwayi is suitable as a pasture species, particularly as both sheep and cattle fodder, and its form provides shelter for lambs and newly shorn sheep. Its drought resistant qualities allow it to produce consistent growth it but does not provide high quality fodder and will not persist under high grazing pressure.

== Threats and conservation ==
Poa rodwayi is sensitive to overgrazing by livestock, land use changes such as pasture development and dune destabilisation in coastal environments. The addition of fertilisers and increased irrigation for agriculture allows other species to dominate and exclude it from the vegetation community.

When constituting 50% more of the vegetation cover in an area, Poa rodwayi can qualify an ecological community as a Lowland Themeda triandra (kangaroo grass) Grassland, which is considered to be a nationally threatened ecological community, protected by Australia's Environment Protection and Biodiversity Conservation Act 1999 (EPBC Act). This type of vegetation community is recognised for its high levels of biodiversity driven by limiting factors such as rainfall consistency, soil fertility and temperature extremes.
