= Poa paramoensis =

Conservation status
- Least Concern (IUCN 3.1)

Scientific classification
- Kingdom: Plantae
- Clade: Tracheophytes
- Clade: Angiosperms
- Clade: Monocots
- Clade: Commelinids
- Order: Poales
- Family: Poaceae
- Subfamily: Pooideae
- Genus: Poa
- Species: P. paramoensis

Binomial name
- Poa paramoensis Lægaard

Species of grass

Poa paramoensis is a species of grass in the family Poaceae. It is found only in Ecuador.
