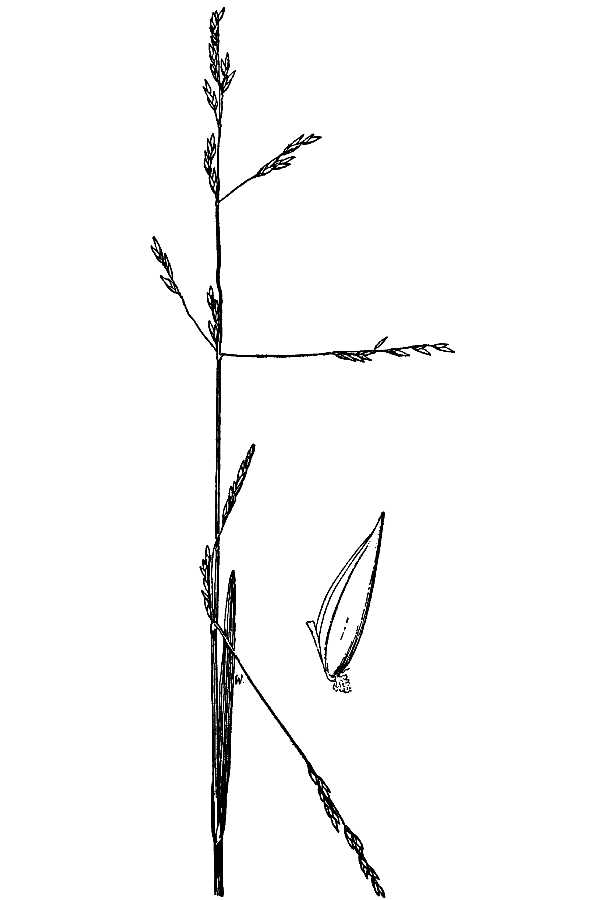

Conservation status
- Least Concern (IUCN 3.1)

Scientific classification
- Kingdom: Plantae
- Clade: Tracheophytes
- Clade: Angiosperms
- Clade: Monocots
- Clade: Commelinids
- Order: Poales
- Family: Poaceae
- Subfamily: Pooideae
- Genus: Poa
- Species: P. bolanderi

Binomial name
- Poa bolanderi Vasey

Synonyms
- Poa bolanderi subsp. chandleri (Vasey) Piper; Poa horneri H.St.John; Poa howellii var. chandleri Vasey

= Poa bolanderi =

Species of grass

Poa bolanderi is a species of grass known by the common name Bolander's bluegrass. It is native to western North America from British Columbia to Utah to California, where it is a resident of mountain habitat, particularly pine and fir forests. It is an annual grass growing in clumps up to 60 centimeters tall. The inflorescence occupies the top 10 to 15 centimeters of the stem. It is narrow in flower, with branches appressed, growing parallel to the stem. As the fruit develops the branches spread out, becoming perpendicular to the stem, nodding, or drooping. The branches have few, sparse spikelets.

Poa bolanderi commemorates Henry Nicholas Bolander, who collected the type specimen in present-day Yosemite National Park in 1866.
