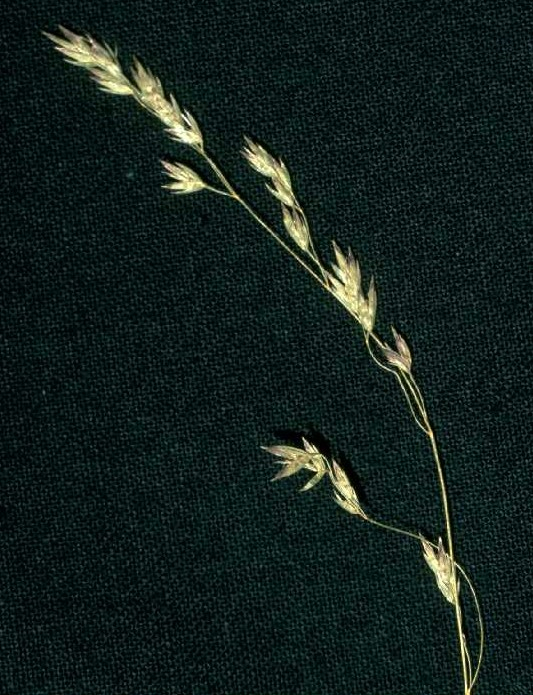

Conservation status
- Least Concern (IUCN 3.1)

Scientific classification
- Kingdom: Plantae
- Clade: Tracheophytes
- Clade: Angiosperms
- Clade: Monocots
- Clade: Commelinids
- Order: Poales
- Family: Poaceae
- Subfamily: Pooideae
- Genus: Poa
- Species: P. leptocoma

Binomial name
- Poa leptocoma Trin.

= Poa leptocoma =

Species of grass

Poa leptocoma is a species of grass known by the common names marsh bluegrass and western bog bluegrass.

== Distribution ==
It is native to western North America from Alaska to New Mexico, where it grows in subalpine and alpine climates and the Arctic. It is also known from the Kamchatka Peninsula.

== Description ==
Poa leptocoma grows in moist habitats, including meadows and land next to lakes, ponds, and streams. It is a perennial grass growing in loose clumps with stems up to 70 to 100 centimeters in maximum height. The inflorescence is a series of branches bearing spikelets, the branches growing appressed to the stem and then spreading out and drooping from the stem as the spikelets mature. The spikelets are green to blue to dark purple in color.
