= Poa ensiformis =

Scientific classification
- Kingdom: Plantae
- Clade: Tracheophytes
- Clade: Angiosperms
- Clade: Monocots
- Clade: Commelinids
- Order: Poales
- Family: Poaceae
- Subfamily: Pooideae
- Genus: Poa
- Species: P. ensiformis

Binomial name
- Poa ensiformis Vickery

Synonyms
- Poa caespitosa var. latifolia Benth.

Species of grass

Poa ensiformis, commonly known as sword tussock-grass or purple-sheathed tussock-grass, is a species of tussock grass that is endemic to Australia.

The species was formally described in 1970 by Australian botanist Joyce Winifred Vickery based on plant material collected to the north of Kiandra in New South Wales.
