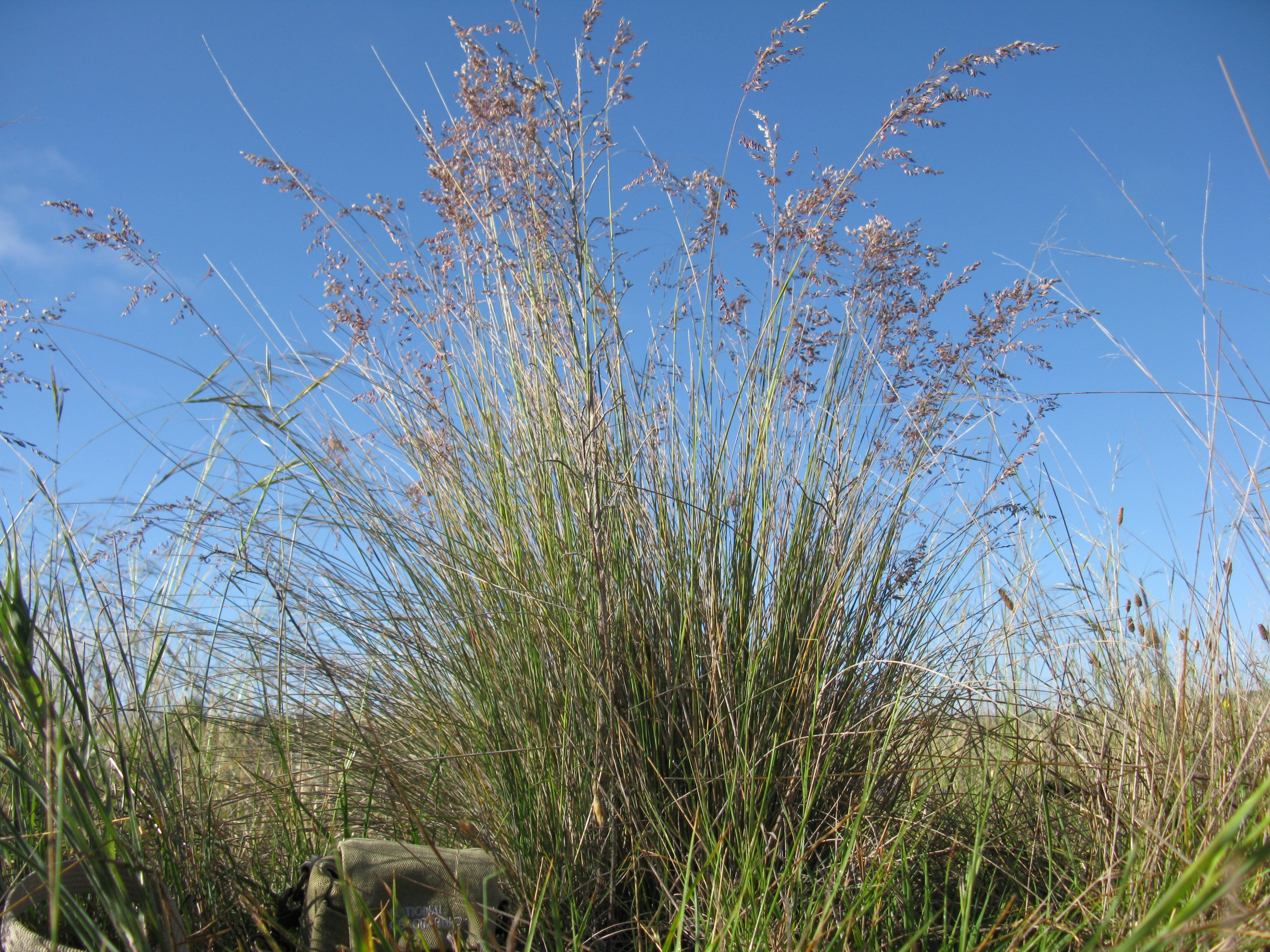

Scientific classification
- Kingdom: Plantae
- Clade: Tracheophytes
- Clade: Angiosperms
- Clade: Monocots
- Clade: Commelinids
- Order: Poales
- Family: Poaceae
- Subfamily: Pooideae
- Genus: Poa
- Species: P. sieberiana

Binomial name
- Poa sieberiana Spreng.

= Poa sieberiana =

Species of plant

Poa sieberiana, commonly known as grey tussock-grass and snow grass, is a species of tussock grass that is endemic to Australia.

The species was formally described in 1827 by German botanist Kurt Sprengel in Systema Vegetabilium.
