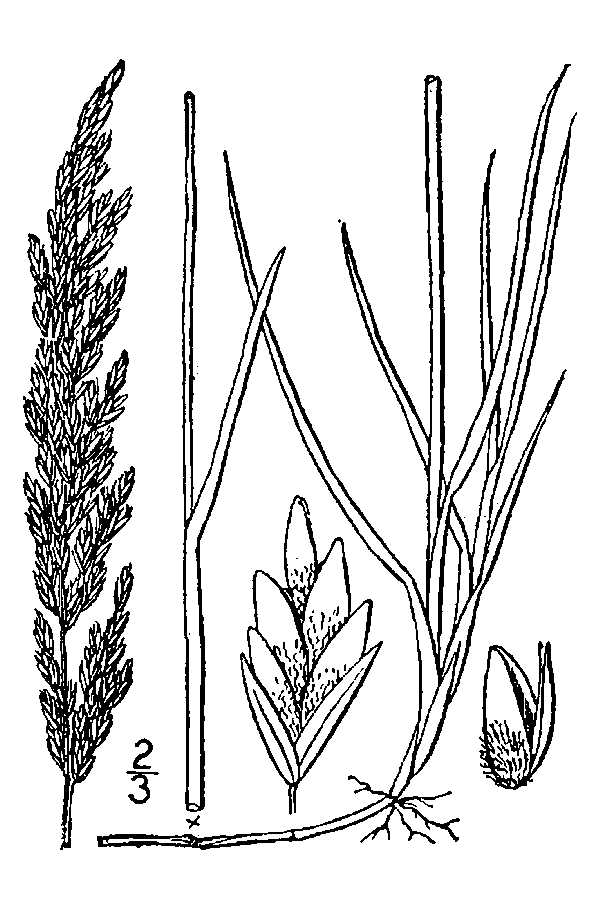

Conservation status
- Secure (NatureServe)

Scientific classification
- Kingdom: Plantae
- Clade: Tracheophytes
- Clade: Angiosperms
- Clade: Monocots
- Clade: Commelinids
- Order: Poales
- Family: Poaceae
- Subfamily: Pooideae
- Genus: Poa
- Species: P. arida

Binomial name
- Poa arida Vasey

Synonyms
- Paneion aridum (Vasey) Lunell; Paneion pratensiforme (Rydb.) Lunell; Poa andina var. purpurea Vasey; Poa fendleriana var. arida (Vasey) M.E.Jones; Poa glaucifolia Scribn. & T.A.Williams; Poa overi Rydb.; Poa planifolia Scribn. & T.A.Williams; Poa plattensis Rydb.; Poa pratensiformis Rydb.; Poa pratensis var. pseudopratensis M.E.Jones; Poa pratericola Rydb. & Nash; Poa pseudopratensis Scribn. & Rydb.; Poa sheldonii Vasey

= Poa arida =

Species of grass

Poa arida is a species of grass known by the common names plains bluegrass and prairie speargrass. It is native to North America, where it occurs throughout western and central Canada and the central United States. It is most common east of the Continental Divide; specimens west are often misidentifications.

This perennial grass grows up to 80 centimeters tall. The inflorescence is usually compact, its spikelets containing 3 to 7 flowers each. The grass sometimes has rhizomes. It grows in tufts or clumps or sometimes solitary. It reproduces by seed and by rhizome.

The grass grows in many types of habitat in the Rocky Mountains, the Colorado Plateau, the Great Plains, and other adjacent regions. It can be found in grassland, sagebrush, shrubsteppe, and prairie. It can be found in alpine climates and saltgrass plant communities. The northern limit of its distribution is in northern Alberta.
