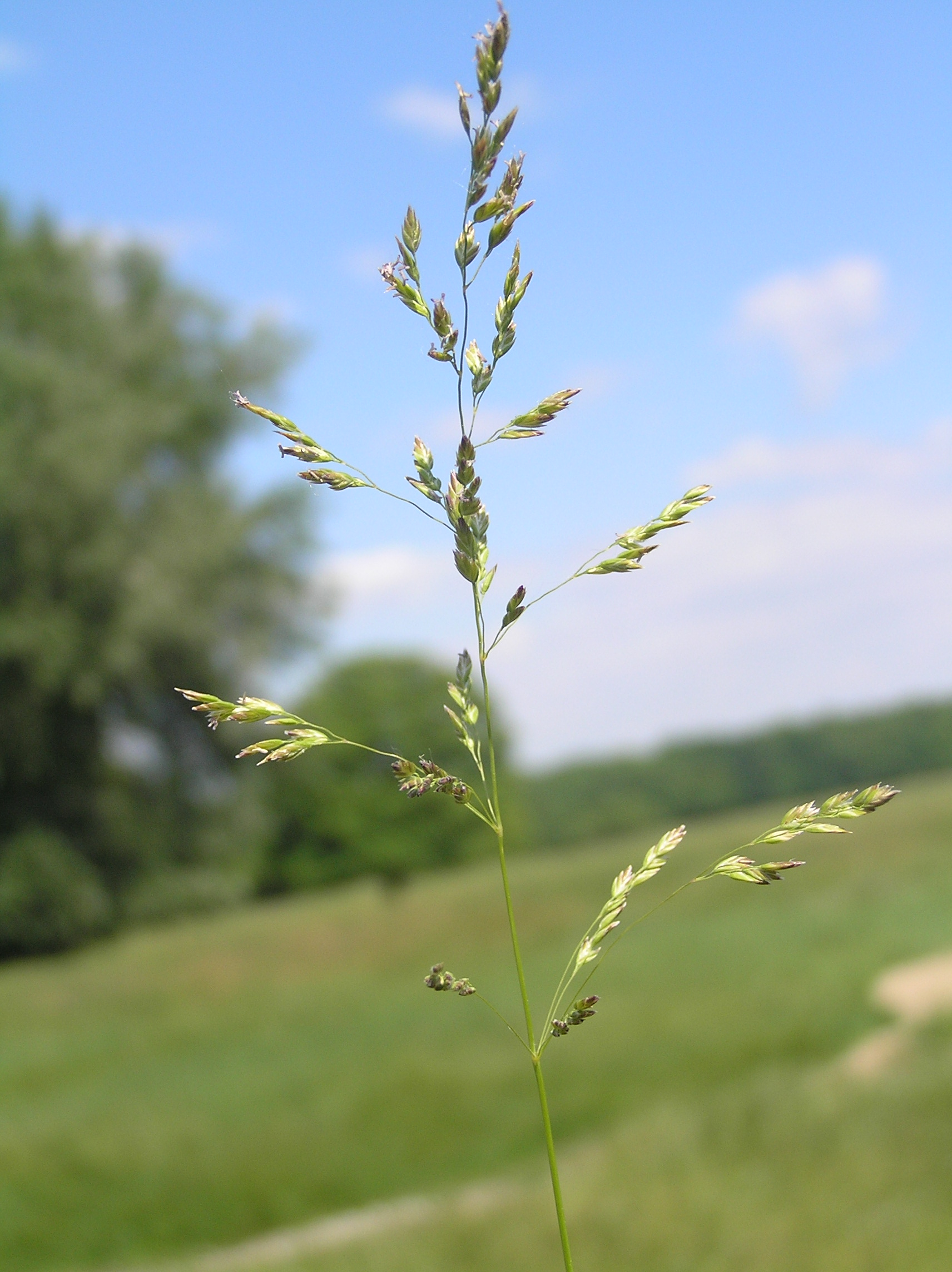

Conservation status
- Least Concern (IUCN 3.1)

Scientific classification
- Kingdom: Plantae
- Clade: Tracheophytes
- Clade: Angiosperms
- Clade: Monocots
- Clade: Commelinids
- Order: Poales
- Family: Poaceae
- Subfamily: Pooideae
- Genus: Poa
- Species: P. angustifolia

Binomial name
- Poa angustifolia L.

Synonyms
- Poa pratensis var. angustifolia (L.) Sm.; Poa pratensis f. angustifolia (L.) Döll; Poa pratensis subsp. angustifolia (L.) Dumort.; Poa pratensis var. collina Schur; Poa angustifolia subsp. brizoides K.Richt.; Poa hamhungensis I.C.Chung; Poa nymanii Tineo; Poa setacea Hoffm.

= Poa angustifolia =

Species of grass

Poa angustifolia L., commonly known as narrow‑leaf meadow‑grass, is a species of grass in the family Poaceae.

Its native range is Azores, Morocco and temperate Eurasia.

== Taxonomy ==
Poa angustifolia was first described by Carl Linnaeus in Species Plantarum (1753: 67).

=== Type specimen ===
The name is typified by material in Linnaeus’s herbarium (UPS). A lectotype has been designated from Linnaean collections.

=== Timeline of taxonomic treatments ===
- 1753 — Linnaeus described P. angustifolia as a distinct species in Species Plantarum.
- 1831 — Du Mortier listed P. angustifolia with its own diagnosis, but within his framework he subordinated it under Poa pratensis as a subspecies.
- 1890s — Rouy treated the P. angustifolia as P. pratensis proles angustifolia, reflecting its close affinity with the P. pratensis complex. In his Flore de France, he distinguished two forms: the “common” or typical form, and the "bristle-like form.
- Early 20th century — Numerous forms (forma) were described by Soó, Podpěra, Domin, and others, emphasizing morphological variation in leaf width and panicle structure.
- Mid 20th century — Some floras considered it conspecific with P. pratensis, while others retained it as a narrow‑leaved segregate.
- Present — Modern databases accept P. angustifolia L. as a distinct species, though many regional floras still treat it as a subspecies or variety of P. pratensis.

=== Historical references ===
In the protologue, Linnaeus cited several earlier works that described similar grasses:

- Bauhin, Pinax Theatri Botanici (1623), vol. 2, proar. 5 — an early systematic compilation of plant names.
- Scheuchzer, Agrostographia (1719) — one of the first dedicated grass monographs. Scheuchzer gave a full morphological account of the narrow‑leaved meadow‑grass. His description was later echoed by Linnaeus in separating P. angustifolia from the broader‑leaved P. pratensis.
- Flora Lapponica (1737) — Linnaeus’s Lapland flora, where he described awl‑leaved forms and noted their abundance across Lapland, intermixed with related species.
- Flora Svecica (1745) — Linnaeus’s own account of Swedish flora. Linnaeus did not name P. angustifoolia in the description but emphasized the narrow leaves and the open panicle, distinguishing it from P. pratensis (Kentucky bluegrass or common meadow-grass), which has broader leaves and a denser panicle.
- Flora Parisiensis (1749) — was a regional flora of the Paris basin that incorporated diagnostic notes on grasses. In this section, the author Dalibard, described a meadow‑grass with ovate‑oblong spikelets and awl‑shaped leaves. This narrow‑leaved form corresponds to what Linnaeus later formalized as P. angustifolia in Species Plantarum (1753). Linnaeus cited Dalibard’s wording directly in the protologue, using it as corroborating evidence to separate the taxon from the broader‑leaved complex of P. pratensis.

These references demonstrate how Linnaeus anchored his new species concept in the broader European botanical tradition.

== Synonyms ==
P. angustifolia has an extensive synonymy, reflecting its variable morphology and shifting taxonomic concepts. The following names have been published as synonyms of P. angustifolia L.

Synonym	Rank	Author
Poa pratensis var. angustifolia	variety	(L.) Sm.
Poa pratensis f. angustifolia	form	(L.) Döll
Poa pratensis subsp. angustifolia	subspecies	(L.) Dumort.
Poa pratensis proles angustifolia	proles	(L.) Rouy
Poa pratensis var. collina	variety	Schur
Poa pratensis var. convolutifolia	variety	Schltdl.
Poa pratensis var. filiformis	variety	Zapał.
Poa pratensis var. strigosa	variety	(Hoffm.) Gaudich.
Poa pratensis var. hirtula	variety	Asch. & Graebn.
Poa pratensis var. obornyana	variety	Podp.
Poa pratensis var. praesignis	variety	Domin
Poa pratensis var. straminea	variety	Rother
Poa pratensis subsp. atlantis	subspecies	Maire
Poa angustifolia subsp. brizoides	subspecies	K.Richt.
Poa angustifolia subsp. nymanii	subspecies	(Tineo) K.Richt.
Poa angustifolia var. minor	variety	C.C.Gmel.
Poa angustifolia var. strigosa	variety	(Hoffm.) DC.
Poa angustifolia var. violacea	variety	Popov
Poa angustifolia f. collina	form	(Schur) Soó
Poa angustifolia f. decipiens	form	Lindm.
Poa angustifolia f. filiformis	form	(Zapał.) Soó
Poa angustifolia f. glauca	form	(Zapał.) Soó
Poa angustifolia f. hirtula	form	(Asch. & Graebn.) Soó
Poa angustifolia f. longifolia	form	(Podp.) Soó
Poa angustifolia f. longiglumis	form	Lindm.
Poa angustifolia f. praesignis	form	(Domin) Soó
Poa angustifolia f. puberula	form	(Beck) Soó
Poa angustifolia f. pyramidalis	form	(Nyár.) Soó
Poa angustifolia f. setacea	form	Holmb.
Poa angustifolia f. straminea	form	(Rother) Soó
Poa brizoides	illegitimate name	Vill.
Poa hamhungensis	species	I.C.Chung
Poa nymanii	species	Tineo
Poa setacea	illegitimate name	Hoffm.
Poa strigosa	species	Hoffm.
Poa villarsii	species	J.F.Gmel.
Poa viridula	species	Palib.
