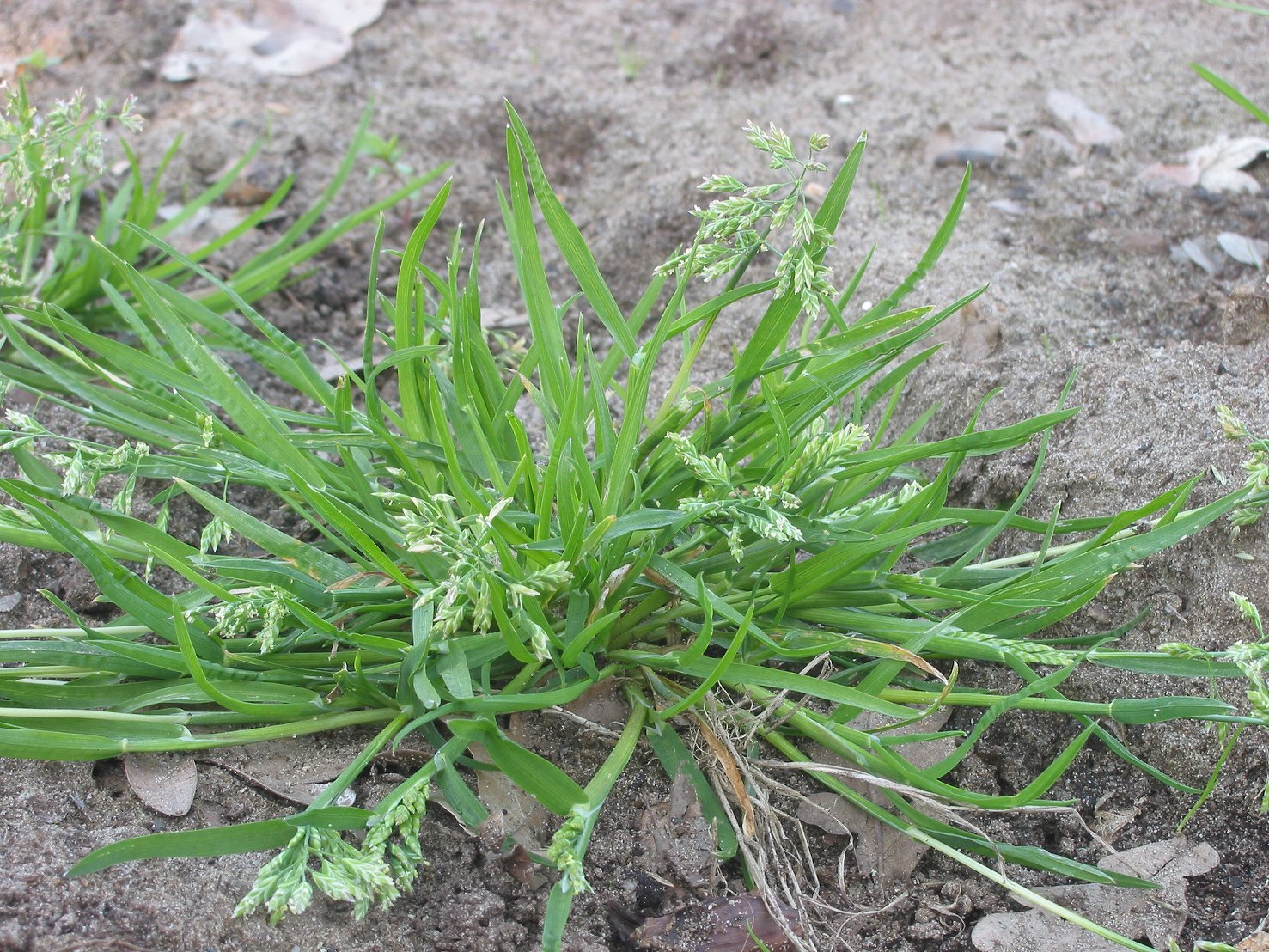
- Poa annua (annual meadow-grass)

Scientific classification
- Kingdom: Plantae
- Clade: Tracheophytes
- Clade: Angiosperms
- Clade: Monocots
- Clade: Commelinids
- Order: Poales
- Family: Poaceae
- Subfamily: Pooideae
- Supertribe: Poodae
- Tribe: Poeae
- Subtribe: Poinae; Dumort.
- Genus: Poa; L. (1753)

Synonyms
- Synonymy: Anthochloa Nees & Meyen; Aphanelytrum Hack.; Austrofestuca (Tzvelev) E.B.Alexeev; Dasypoa Pilg.; Dissanthelium Trin.; Eremopoa Roshev.; Graminastrum E.H.L.Krause; Libyella Pamp.; Lindbergella Bor; Lindbergia Bor, nom. illeg.; Neuropoa Clayton; Ochlopoa (Asch. & Graebn.) H.Scholz; Paneion Lunell, nom. superfl.; Panicularia Heist. ex Fabr., nom. superfl.; Parodiochloa C.E.Hubb.; Phalaridium Nees & Meyen; Poagris Raf., nom. superfl.; Stenochloa Nutt.; Tovarochloa T.D.Macfarl. & But; Tzvelevia E.B.Alexeev

= Poa =

Genus of flowering plants in the grass family

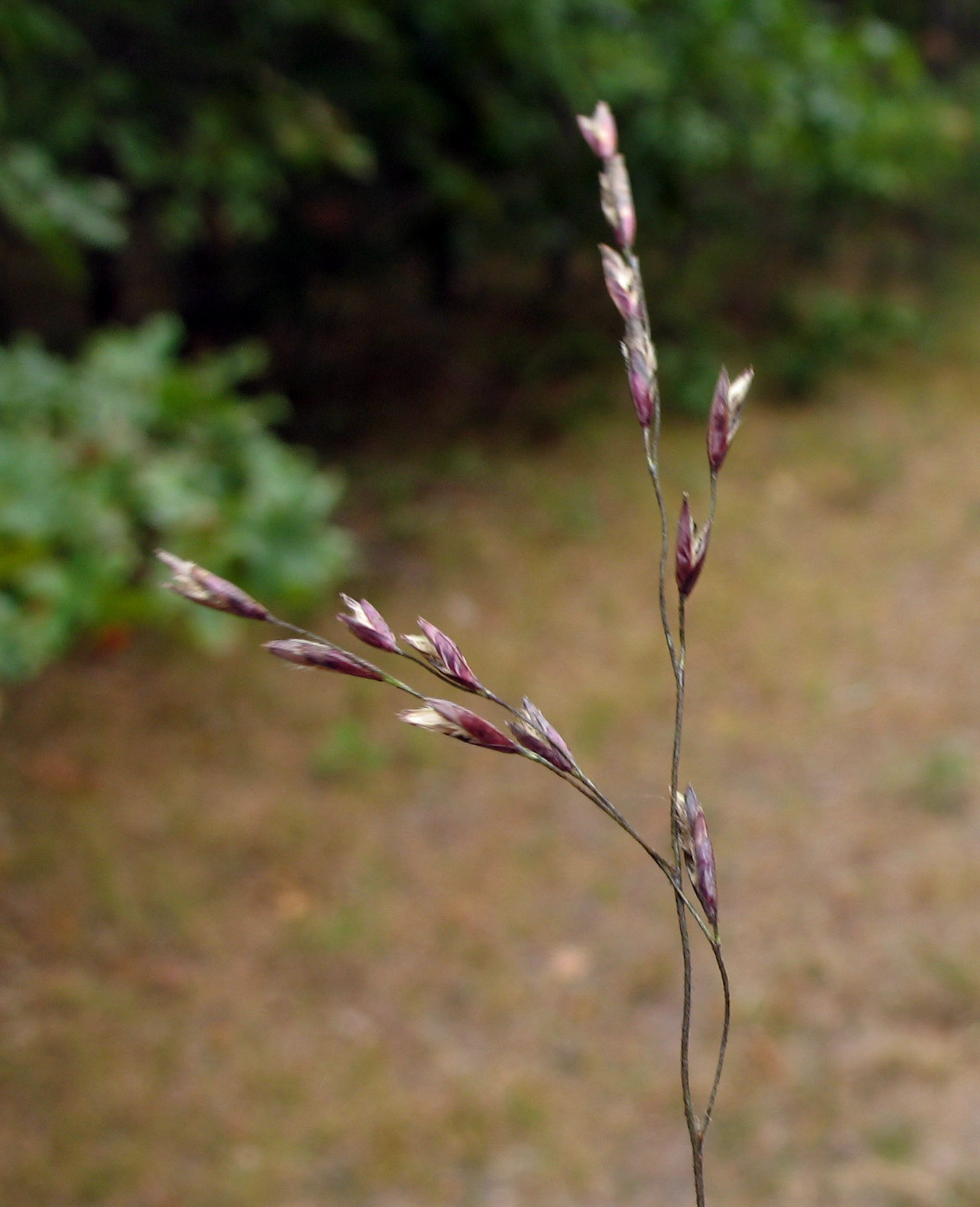
"Bluegrass": The seed pods go from green to purplish blue to brown. During the purplish blue phase the seed stems have a navy-blue coating.

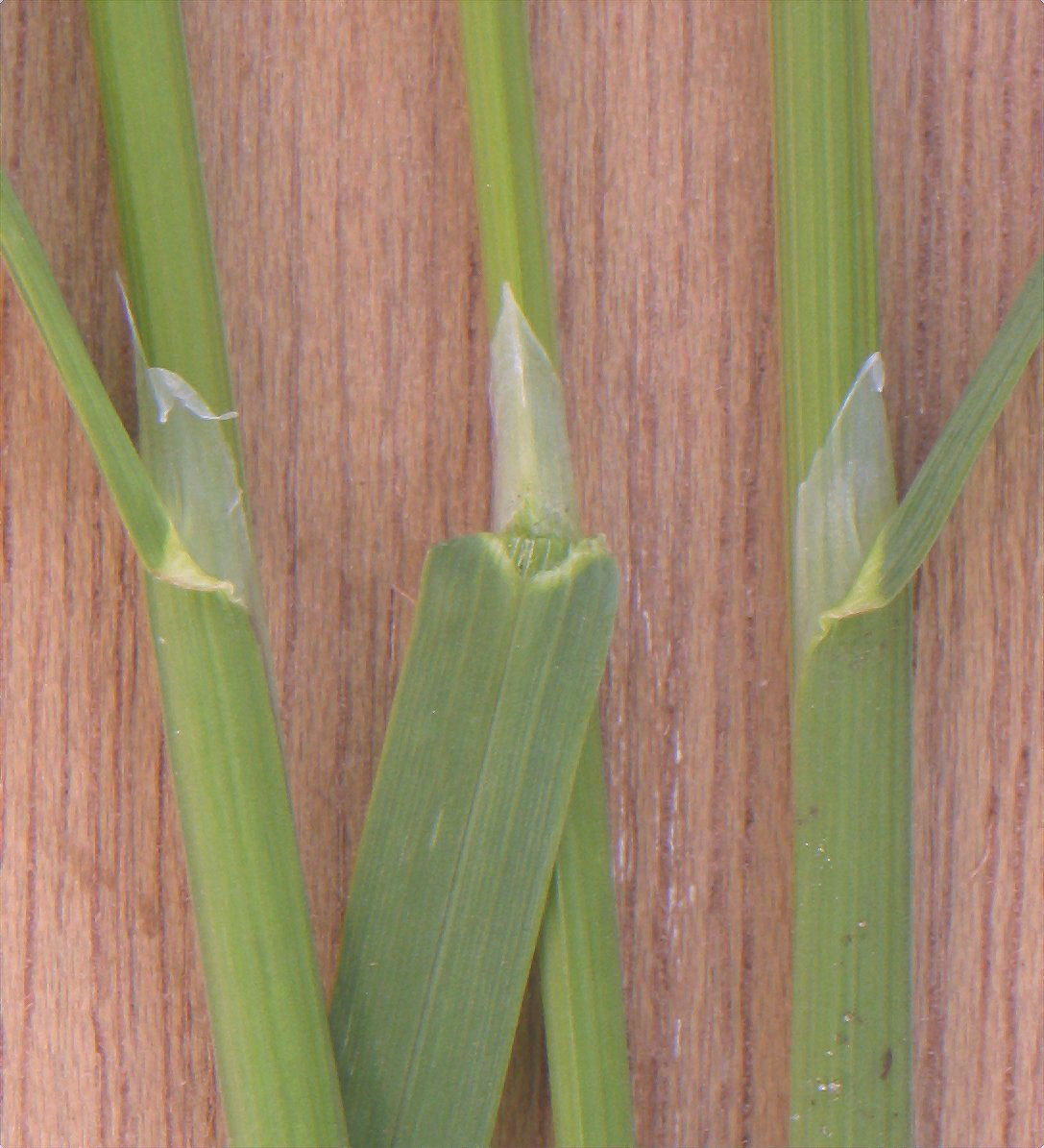
Poa trivialis (rough meadow-grass), showing the ligule structure

Poa is a genus of about 570 species of grasses, native to the temperate regions of both hemispheres. Common names include meadow-grass (mainly in Europe and Asia), bluegrass (mainly in North America), tussock (some New Zealand species), and speargrass. Poa (πόα) is Greek for 'fodder'. Poa are members of the subfamily Pooideae of the family Poaceae.

Bluegrass, which has green leaves, derives its name from the seed heads, which are blue when the plant is allowed to grow to its natural height of two to three feet (0.6 to 0.9 meters).

The genus Poa includes both annual and perennial species. Most are monoecious, but a few are dioecious (separate male and female plants). The leaves are narrow, folded or flat, sometimes bristled, and with the basal sheath flattened or sometimes thickened, with a blunt or hooded apex and membranaceous ligule.

== Selected species ==
- Poa abbreviata – short bluegrass
- Poa affinis
- Poa alpigena – northern meadow-grass
- Poa alpina – alpine meadow-grass
- Poa alsodes – grove bluegrass
- Poa ammophila – sand bluegrass
- Poa angustifolia – narrow-leaved meadow-grass
- Poa annua – annual meadow-grass, annual bluegrass
- Poa arachnifera – Texas bluegrass
- Poa arctica – Arctic meadow-grass
- Poa arida
- Poa atropurpurea – San Bernardino bluegrass
- Poa badensis
- Poa balfourii
- Poa bigelovii
- Poa bolanderi
- Poa bulbosa – bulbous meadow-grass
- Poa chaixii – broad-leaved meadow-grass
- Poa chathamica
- Poa cita – silver tussock
- Poa clivicola - fine-leaved snow grass
- Poa colensoi – blue tussock
- Poa compressa – flattened meadow-grass
- Poa confinis
- Poa cookii – Cook's tussock
- Poa costiniana – bog snow-grass
- Poa curtifolia
- Poa cusickii
- Poa cuspidata
- Poa diaboli – Diablo Canyon bluegrass
- Poa douglasii – Douglas bluegrass
- Poa drummondiana
- Poa dura
- Poa ensiformis – sword tussock-grass, purple-sheathed tussock-grass
- Poa fawcettiae – horny snow-grass
- Poa fendleriana
- Poa flabellata
- Poa flexuosa – wavy meadow-grass
- Poa foliosa – muttonbird poa
- Poa glauca – glaucous meadow-grass
- Poa gunnii
- Poa hiemata – soft snow-grass
- Poa howellii
- Poa humilis – spreading meadow grass
- Poa infirma – early meadow-grass
- Poa iridifolia
- Poa kelloggii
- Poa kerguelensis
- Poa kunthii
- Poa labillardierei – common tussock-grass
- Poa leioclada
- Poa leptocoma
- Poa litorosa
- Poa macrantha
- Poa mannii
- Poa meionectes
- Poa mireniana
- Poa morrisii – soft tussock-grass
- Poa napensis – Napa bluegrass
- Poa nemoralis – wood meadow-grass
- Poa novarae
- Poa paludigena – bog bluegrass
- Poa palustris – swamp meadow-grass
- Poa paramoensis
- Poa poiformis – coast tussock-grass, blue tussock-grass
- Poa pratensis – smooth meadow-grass, Kentucky bluegrass
- Poa rodwayi
- Poa sandvicensis
- Poa secunda – alkali bluegrass, big bluegrass, Nevada bluegrass, pine bluegrass, Sandberg bluegrass, wild bluegrass
- Poa sieberiana – grey tussock-grass
- Poa siphonoglossa
- Poa subcaerulea – spreading meadow-grass
- Poa supina – creeping meadow-grass
- Poa trivialis – rough meadow-grass
- Poa unilateralis

== Cultivation and uses ==
Many of the species are important pasture plants, used extensively by grazing livestock. Kentucky bluegrass (Poa pratensis) is the most extensively used cool-season grass used in lawns, sports fields, and golf courses in the United States. Annual bluegrass (Poa annua) can sometimes be considered a weed.

According to second-century physician Galen, the roots of certain species are good for treating fresh wounds and bleeding. In the sixteenth century, Poa grasses were used to treat inflammation of the kidney.

Some of the Poa species are popular for gardens and for landscaping in New Zealand.

== Insect foodplant ==
Lepidoptera whose caterpillars feed on Poa include:

- Agriphila inquinatella
- Cercyonis pegala (common wood-nymph)
- Poanes hobomok (Hobomok skipper)
- Poanes zabulon (Zabulon skipper)
