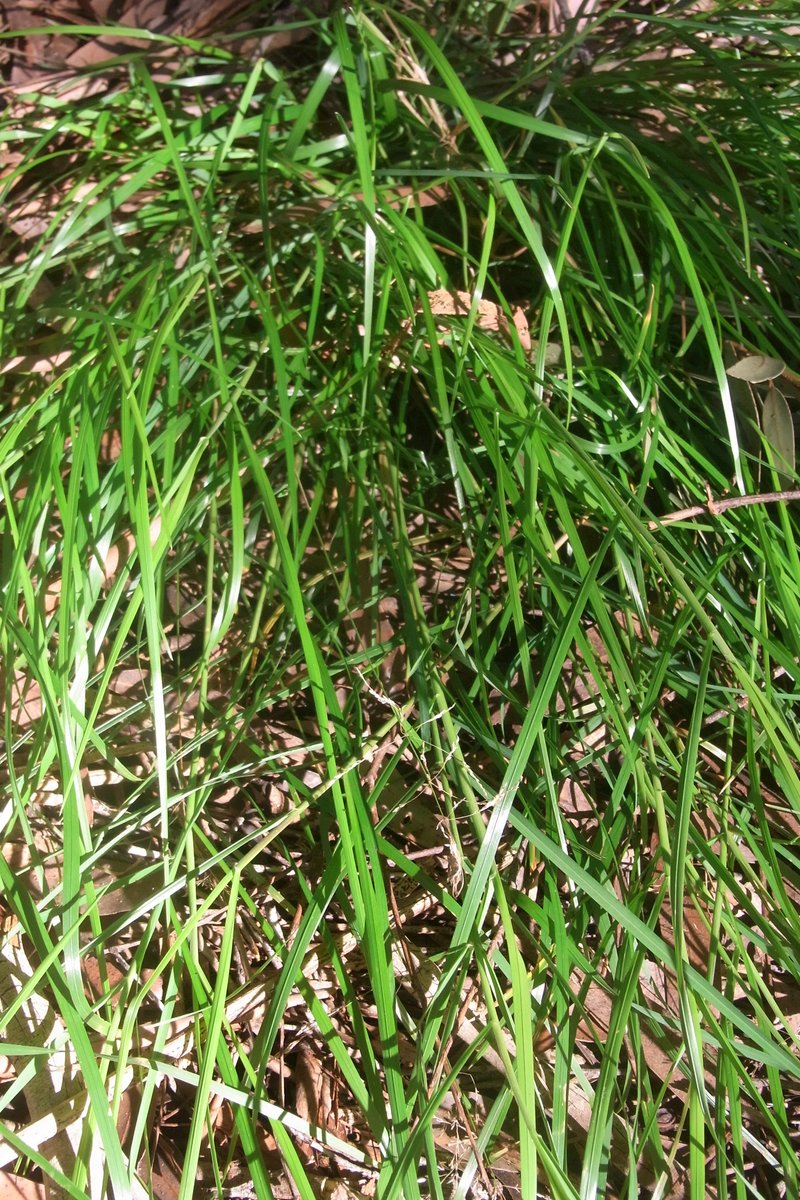
- Chatswood West, Australia

Scientific classification
- Kingdom: Plantae
- Clade: Tracheophytes
- Clade: Angiosperms
- Clade: Monocots
- Clade: Commelinids
- Order: Poales
- Family: Poaceae
- Subfamily: Pooideae
- Genus: Poa
- Species: P. affinis

Binomial name
- Poa affinis R.Br.

= Poa affinis =

Species of grass

Poa affinis is a tussock grass, found near Sydney and the Blue Mountains in Australia. A moderately common plant found growing on soils based on sandstone. It first appeared in scientific literature in 1810, in Prodromus Florae Novae Hollandiae, authored by the prolific Scottish botanist, Robert Brown. The specific epithet affinis means "similar to others".
