= Poa gunnii =

Scientific classification
- Kingdom: Plantae
- Clade: Tracheophytes
- Clade: Angiosperms
- Clade: Monocots
- Clade: Commelinids
- Order: Poales
- Family: Poaceae
- Subfamily: Pooideae
- Genus: Poa
- Species: P. gunnii

Binomial name
- Poa gunnii Vickery

Synonyms
- Poa Australis var. monticola Hook.f.; Poa caespitosa var. alpina F.Muell. ex Benth.

Species of grass

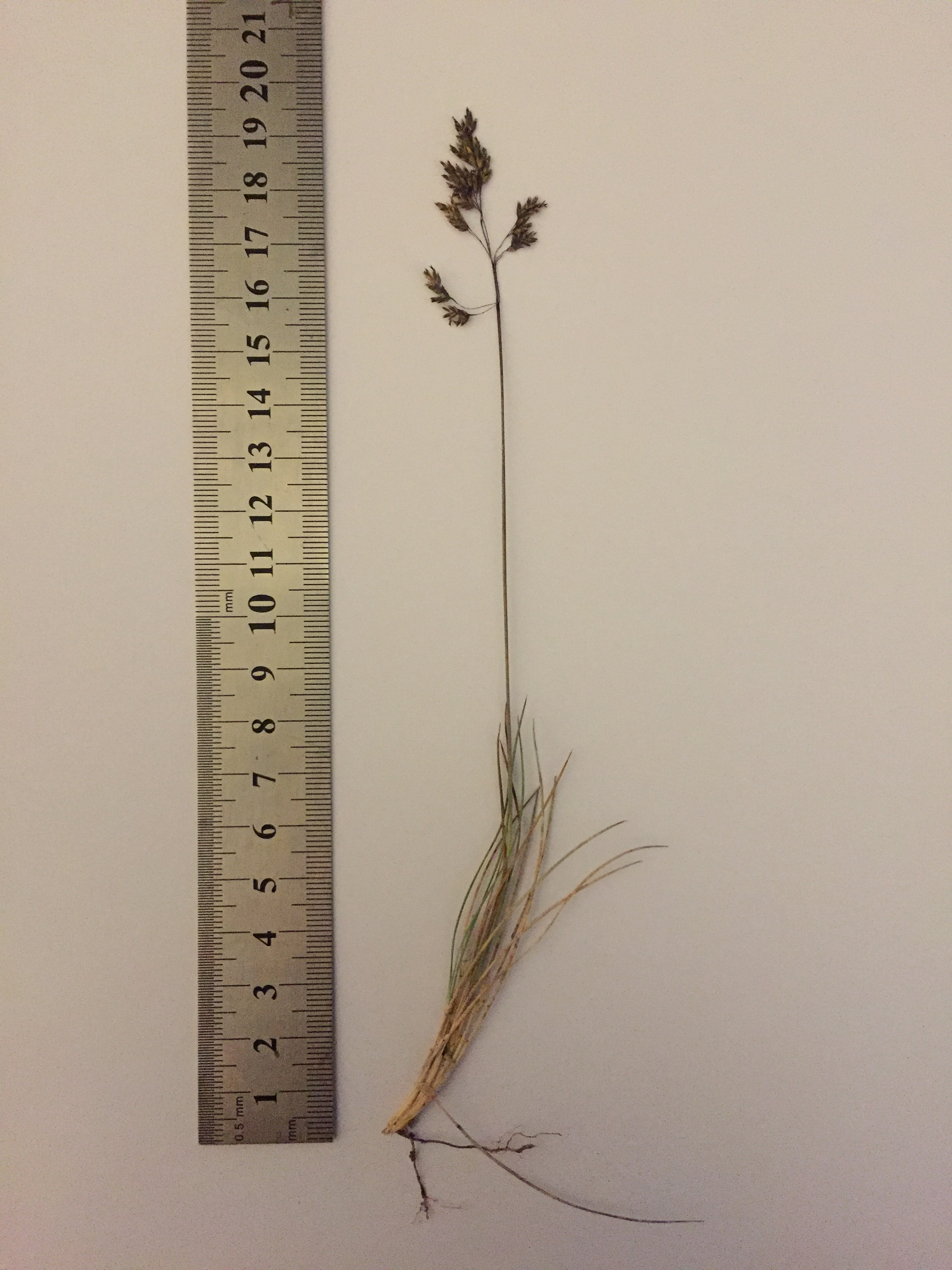
P. gunnii specimen collected from Mt. Field at an altitude of 1200 m. Photo: Frank Bird

Poa gunnii is a Tasmanian endemic tussock grass considered one of the most abundant and common in alpine and subalpine environments from about 800 m to above 1400 m. However it can be found to near sea level in the south of the island state where a cooler climate is prevalent. The genus Poa belongs to the family Poaceae. Tasmania has 16 native and 6 introduced species of Poa.

== Description ==
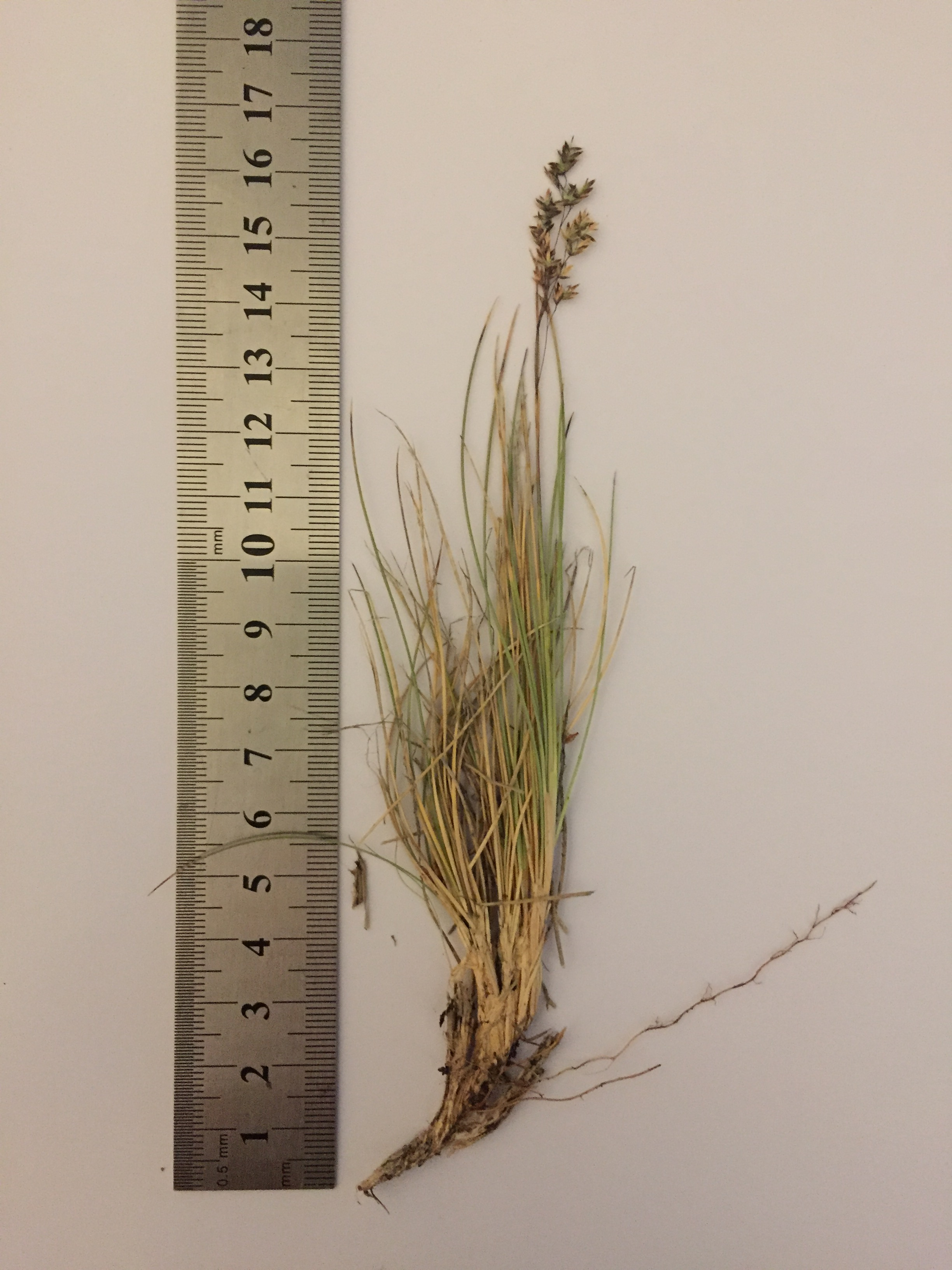
P. gunnii specimen collected from Mt. Field at an altitude of 1200 m. Photo: Frank Bird

Poa gunnii is a very variable species. The most common subalpine and alpine form is stunted but grows up to 20 cm high while forms of P. gunnii at lower altitudes towards sea level are usually taller to 70 cm high and with longer leaves. Leaf sheaths, green or purplish; leaves less than 1mm in diameter, hard, usually round in cross-section. Blades up to 30 cm long, inrolled or folded. Ligules up to 2mm long, firm with tiny hairs on their margins and backs. Flowering spikelets are broadly ovate to lanceolate, 2–6 flowered, green or purplish, often viviparous. P. constantina and P. fawcettiae can be identified from P. gunnii due to the features of the lemma and the prickliness of the leaves.

== Etymology ==
P. gunnii (GUNN-ee-i) after prominent Tasmanian plant collector Ronald Campbell Gunn (1808–1881) who collected the type specimen from "summit of Mt. Wellington (Kunanyi)" in 1841.
