= Lapiș Forest =

Nature reserve in Romania

- Pădurea Lapiș
- IUCN category IV (habitat/species management area)
- Location within Romania
- Location: Romania; Sălaj County
- Nearest city: Șimleu Silvaniei
- Coordinates: 47°15′47″N 22°45′14″E
- Area: 430.40 hectares (1,063.5 acres)
- Established: 2005

Lapiș Forest (Romanian: Pădurea Lapiș) nature reserve IUCN category IV, is located in northwestern Romania, in the west of Sălaj County, near the village of Nușfalău, which is about 9 km from Șimleu Silvaniei.

== Description ==
The Forest Lapiș with an area of 430,40 ha was declared natural protected area by the Government Decision No.2151 in 2004 (published in Romanian Official Paper Number 152 on April 12, 2005) and is a relict of a much bigger cluster of ancient forests Codrii Silvaniei.

== Flora and fauna ==
=== Flora ===
==== Vegetation of forest ====
Pedunculate oak (Quercus pedunculiflora), sessile oak (Quercus petraea), small-leaved lime (Tilia cordata),

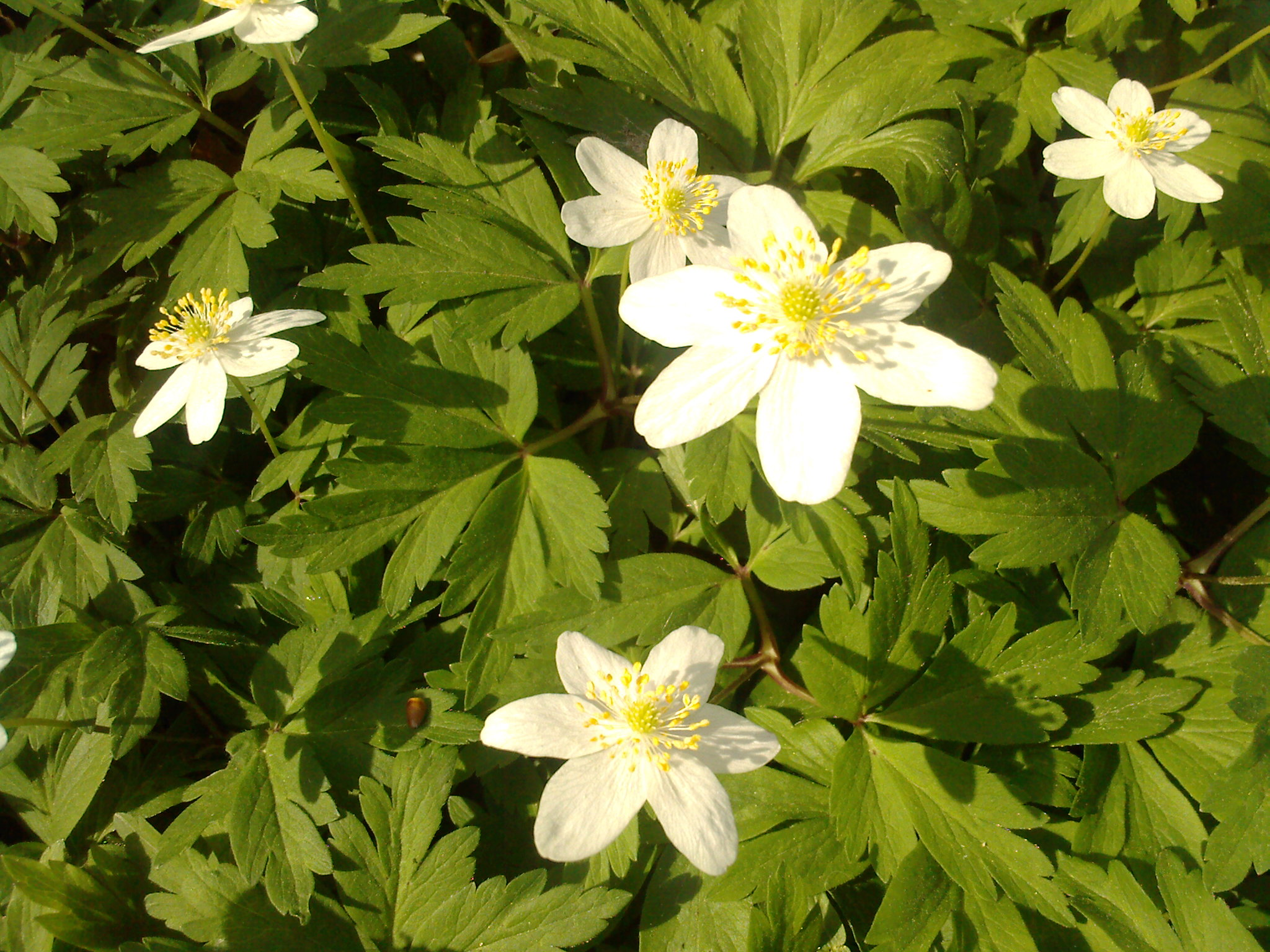
Windflower (Anemone nemorosa)

English oak (Quercus robur), Hungarian oak (Quercus frainetto), European ash (Fraxinus excelsior), Turkey oak (Quercus cerris), European black pine, (Pinus nigra), Scots pine (Pinus sylvestris), black locust (Robinia pseudoacacia), wild cherry (Prunus avium);

==== Species of grass ====
Lungwort (Pulmonaria officinalis), wild arum (Arum maculatum), windflower (Anemone nemorosa), yellow wood anemone (Anemone ranunculoides), smooth meadow-grass (Poa pratensis), red fescue (Festuca rubra).

=== Fauna ===
==== Mammals ====
Fallow deer (Dama dama), red deer (Cervus elaphus), roe deer (Capreolus capreolus), red fox (Vulpes vulpes), wild boar (Sus scrofa), European pine marten (Marten marten), European hamster (Cricetus cricetus), wildcat (Felis silvestris);

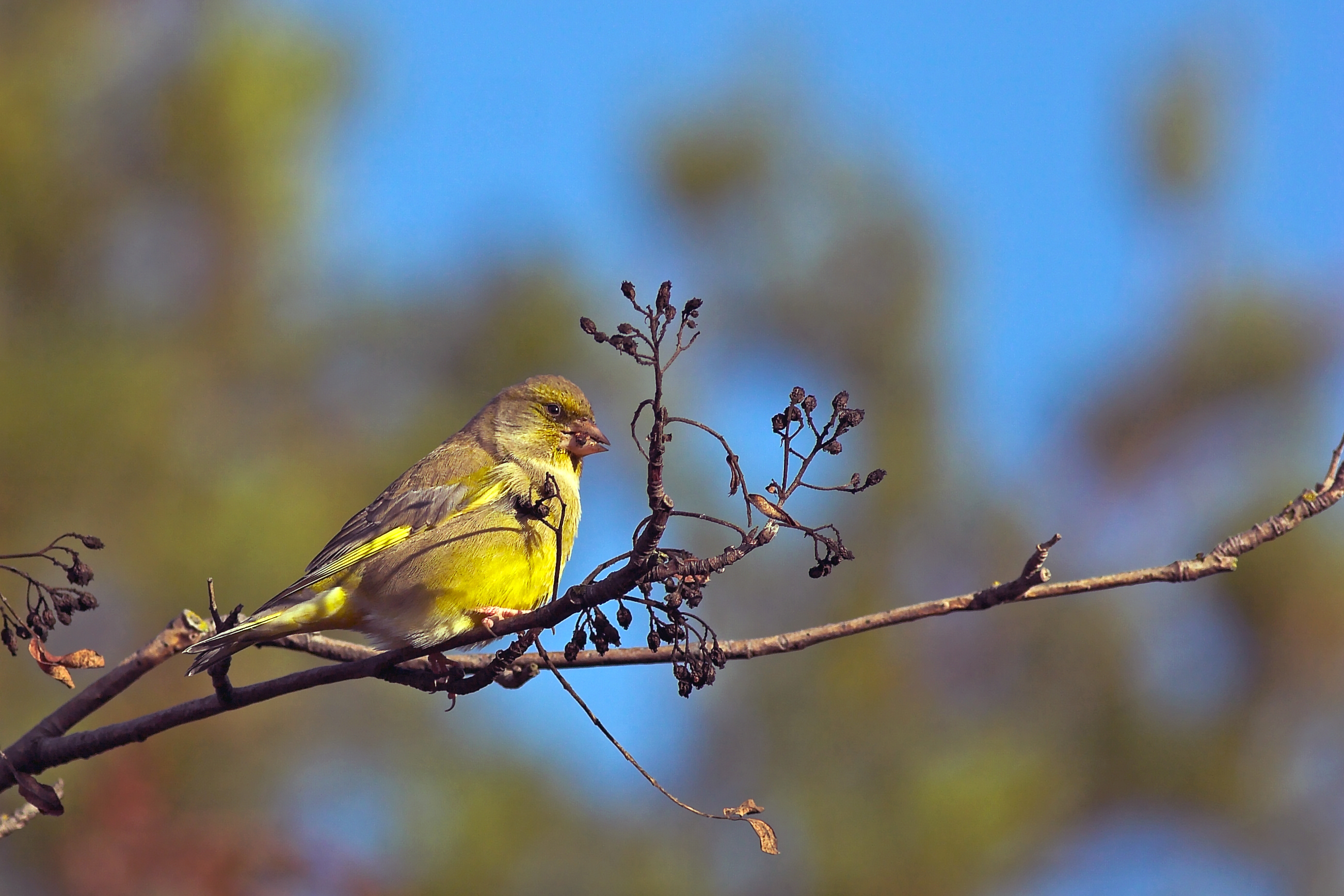
European greenfinch (Carduelis chloris)

==== Birds ====
Avifauna include the lesser spotted woodpecker (Dendrocopos minor), tree pipit (Anthus trivalis), Eurasian scops owl (Otus scops), European greenfinch (Carduelis chloris), southern fiscal (Lanius collaris), Eurasian hobby (Falca subbuteo), blue tit (Parus caeruleus), common raven (Corvus corax), yellowhammer (Emberiza citrinella) and middle spotted woodpecker (Dendrocopos medius).

== Image gallery ==
=== Species of flora ===
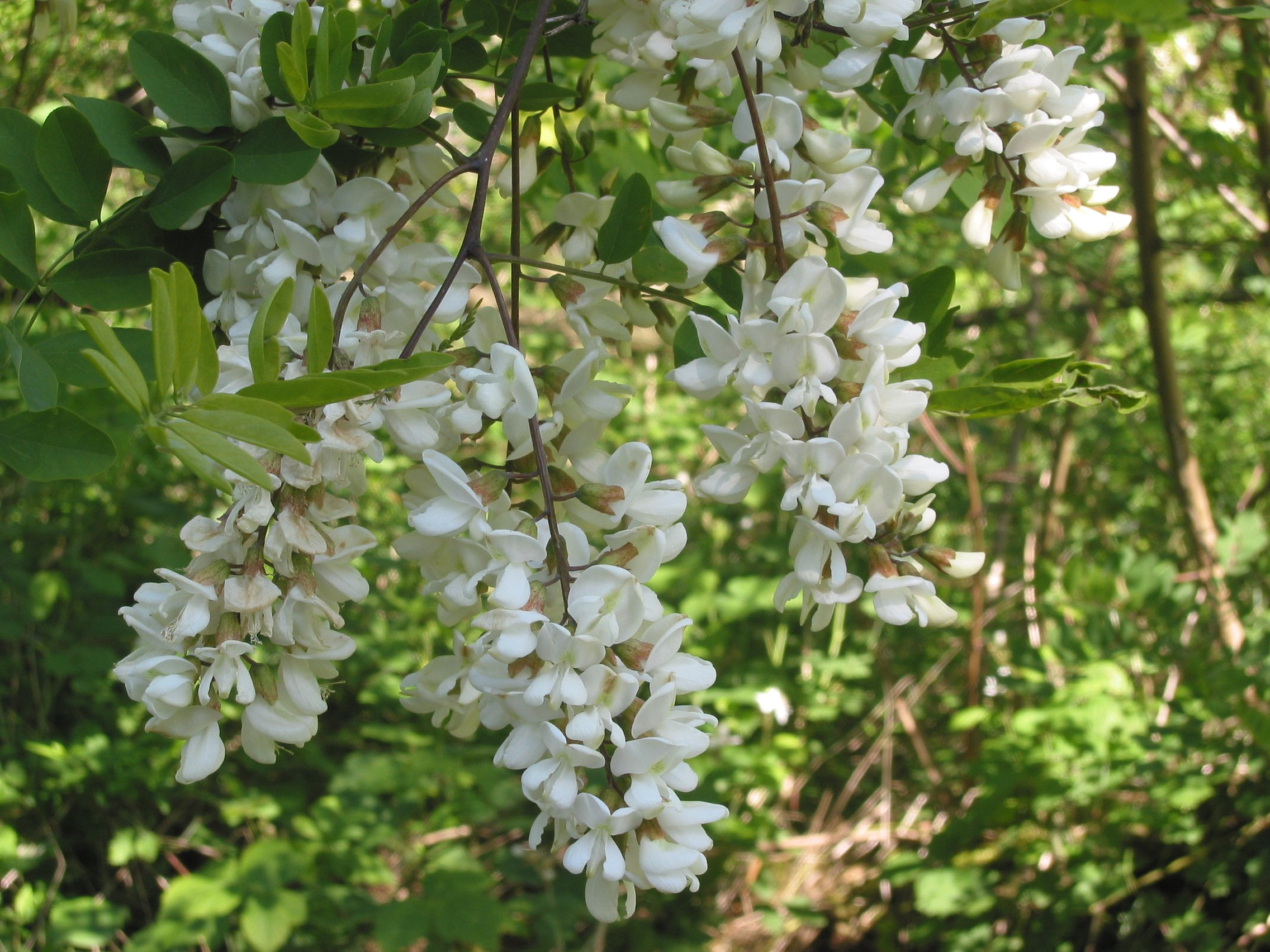
Robinia pseudoacacia

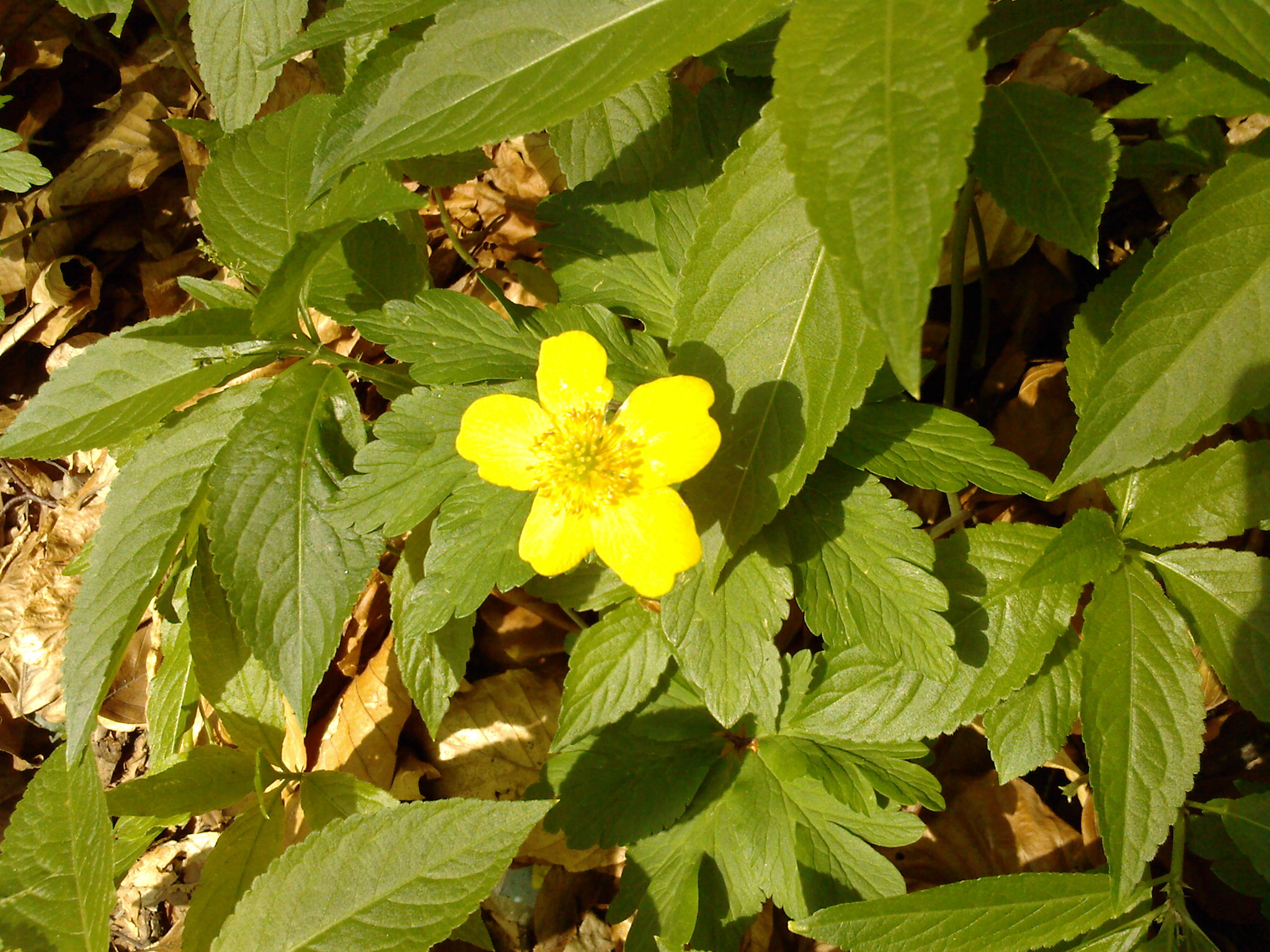
Anemone ranunculoides

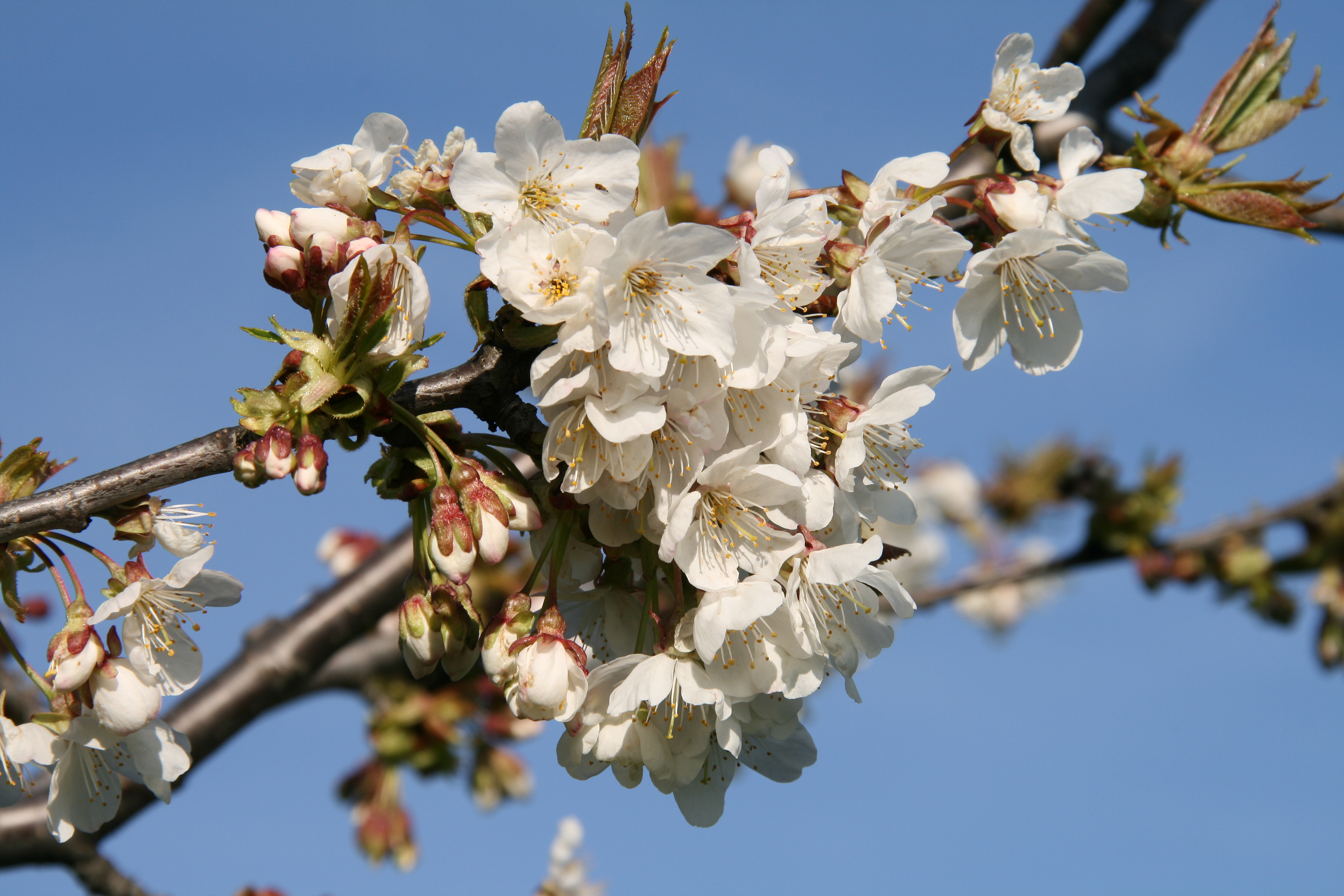
Prunus avium (flowers)

=== Species of fauna ===
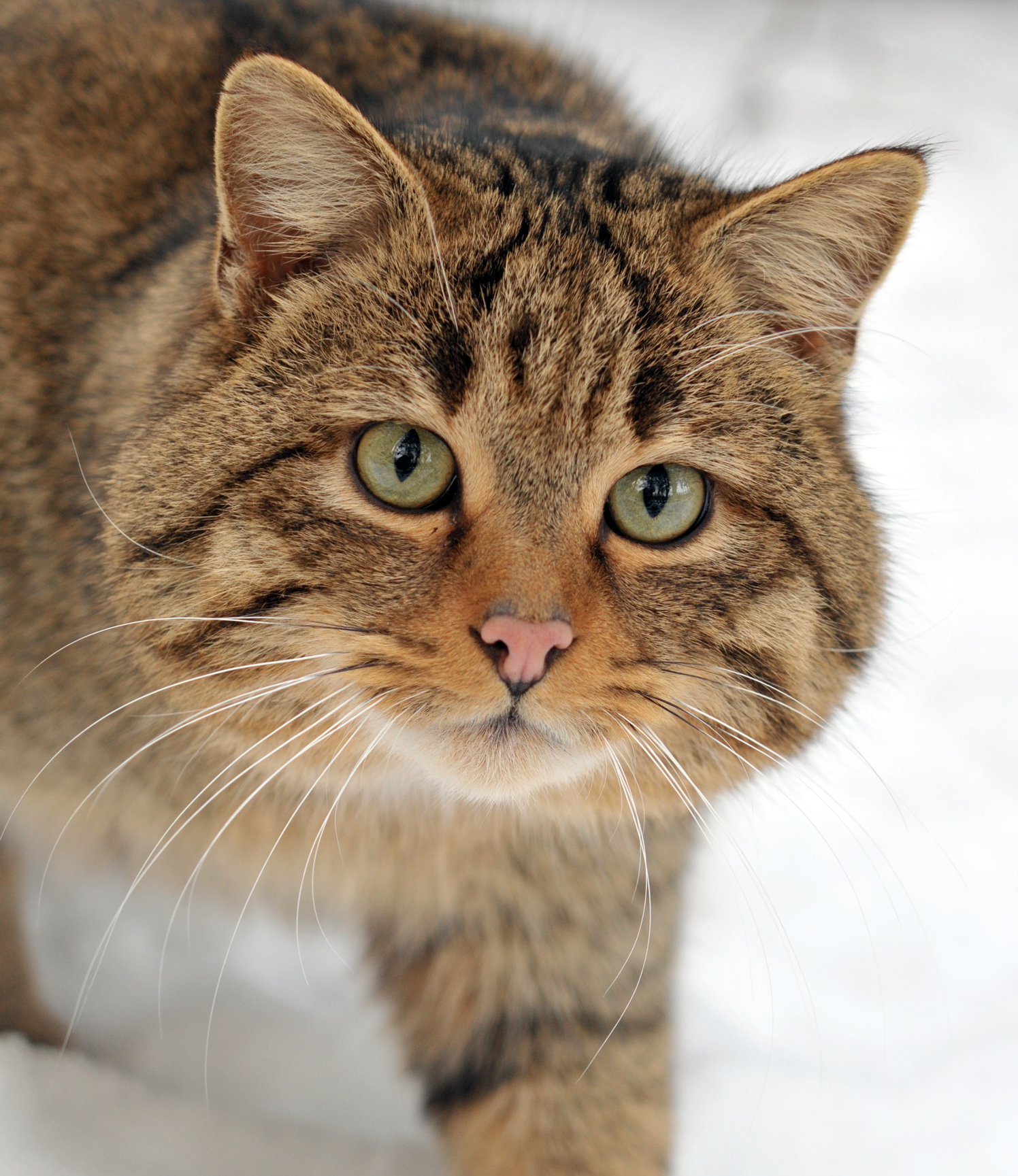
Felis silvestris

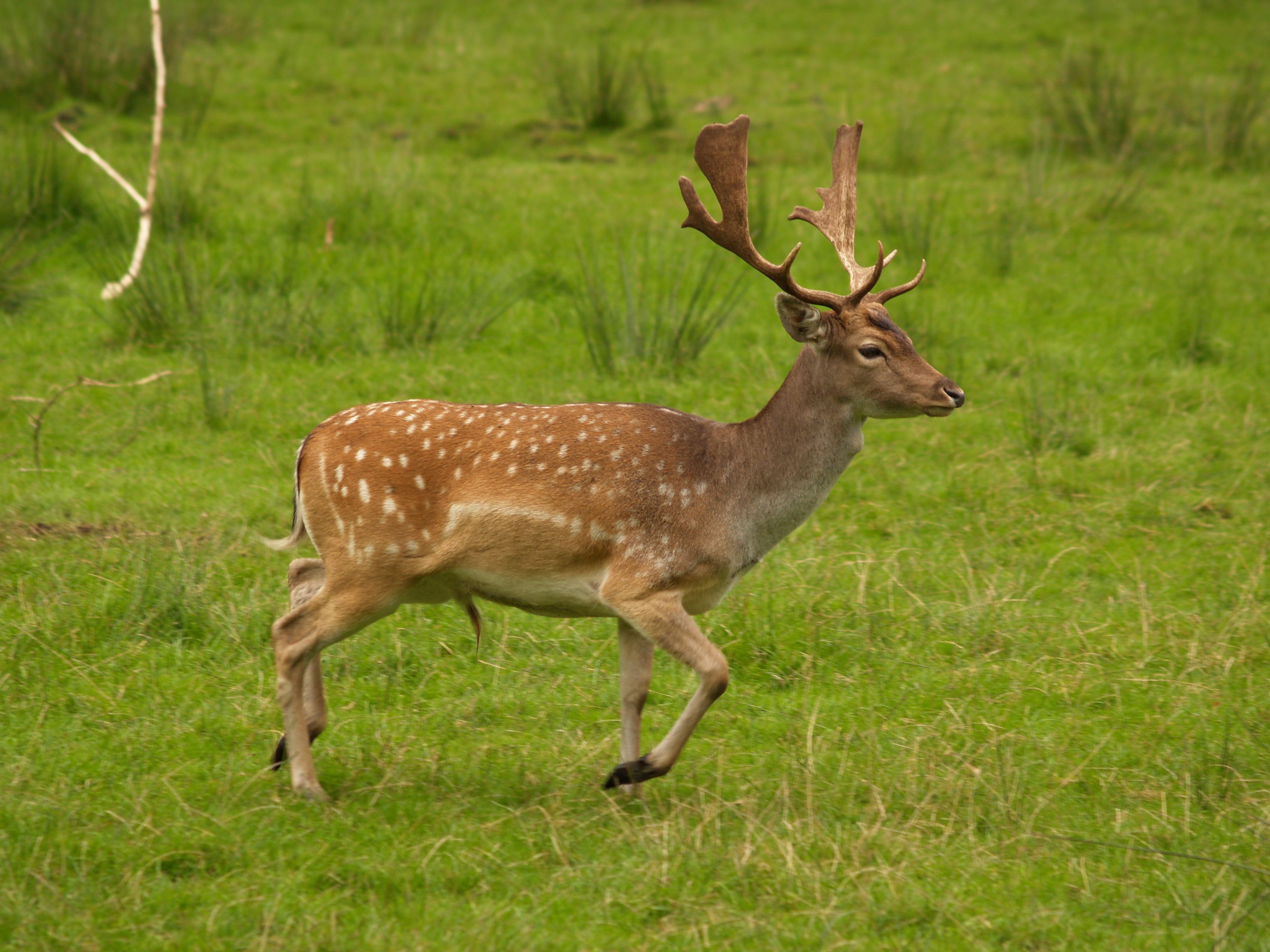
Dama dama

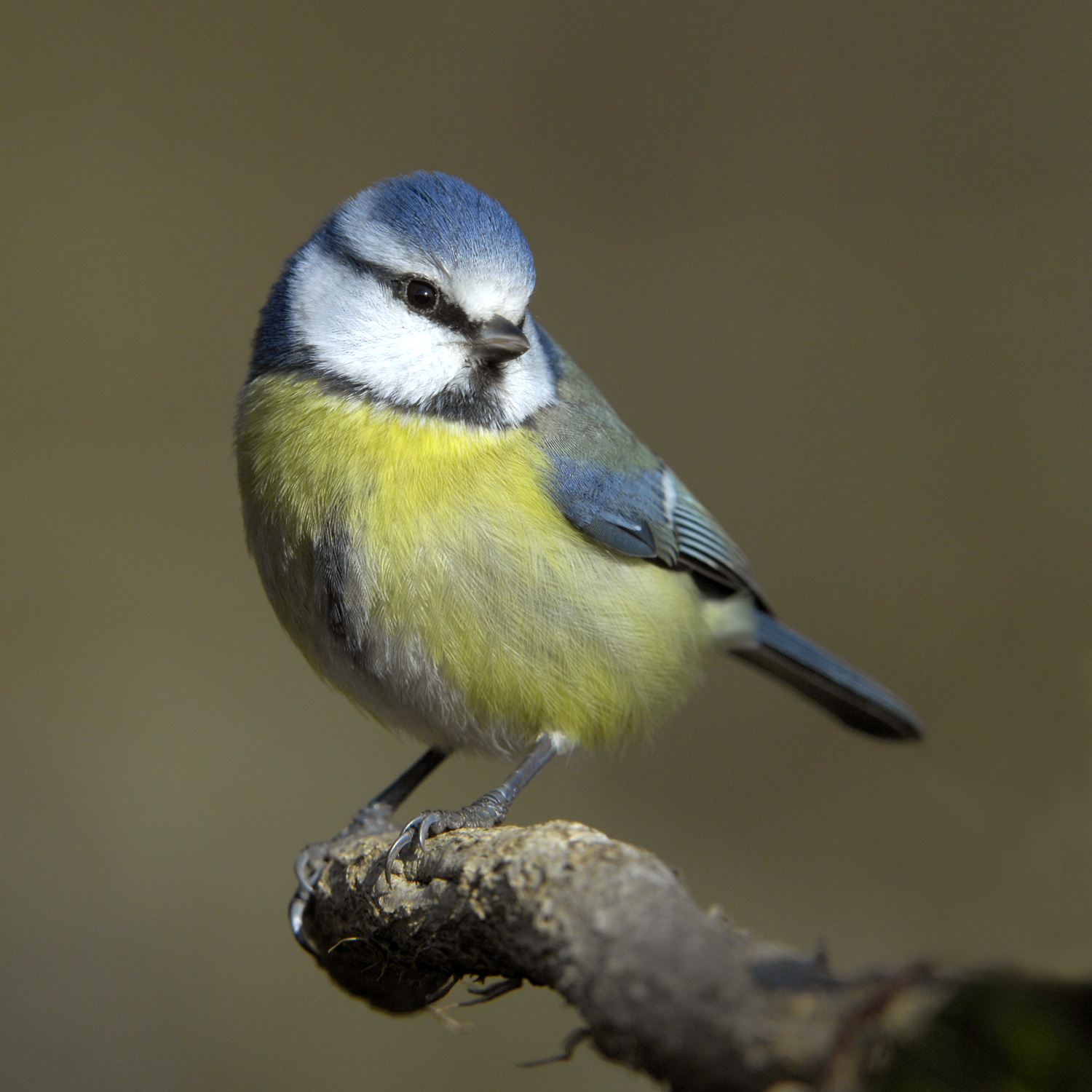
Parus caeruleus

== See also ==
- Cehei Pond
