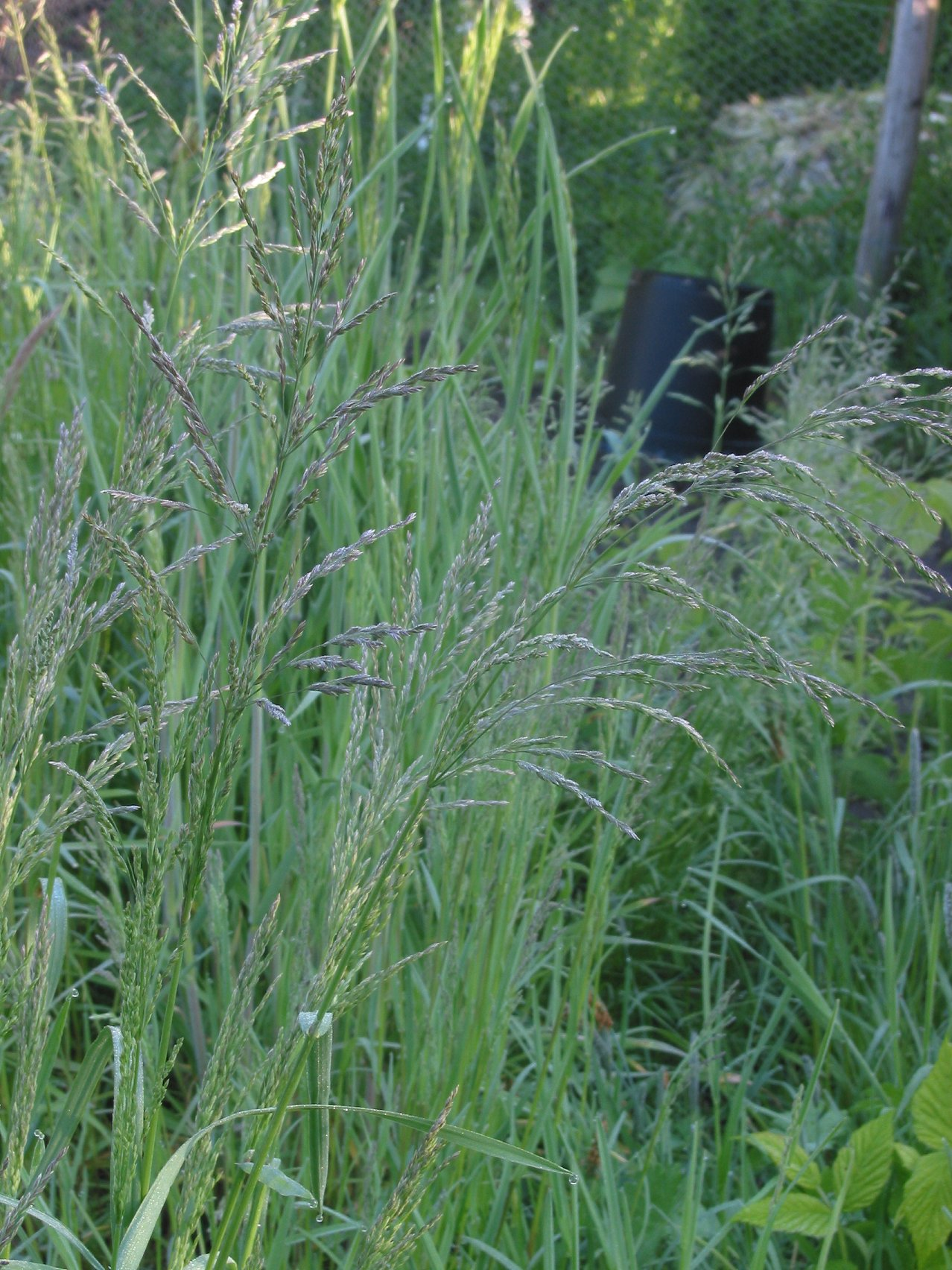

Scientific classification
- Kingdom: Plantae
- Clade: Embryophytes
- Clade: Tracheophytes
- Clade: Spermatophytes
- Clade: Angiosperms
- Clade: Monocots
- Clade: Commelinids
- Order: Poales
- Family: Poaceae
- Subfamily: Pooideae
- Genus: Poa
- Species: P. trivialis

Binomial name
- Poa trivialis L.

= Poa trivialis =

Species of grass

Poa trivialis (rough bluegrass; UK: rough-stalked meadow-grass or rough meadow-grass), is a perennial plant regarded in the US as an ornamental plant. It is part of the grass family.

== Description ==
It is very common in meadows and pastures throughout Britain. Its preferred habitat is moist, sheltered places. Its herbage is plentiful and fairly nutritious, though not as much as Poa annua or Poa pratensis. It is useful for grazing on heavy and damp soil. It also copes well with the polluted atmosphere of towns and cities. It is in flower from June onwards throughout the summer.

It is often considered a weed of golf courses. It is an invasive species in the Great Lakes region and was first sighted in 1843.

It has short stolons. The leaves are broad and tapering, and the sheathes are very rough. It has shiny leaves like Lolium perenne and crested dog's-tail.

They have pointed ligules 4–10 mm (3/16 – 3/8 in.) long. Compare to annual meadow grass Poa annua which is silvery and pointed, and common meadow grass Poa pratensis which is short and blunt.

The roughish, slender stem grows 30 to 60 cm (1 to 2 ft.) high. Compare with smooth meadow grass Poa annua which has a smooth stem. The panicle is green and 15 cm (6 in.) long. The spikelets are egg-shaped.

It has a loose, whorled green panicle, much branched, 15 cm (6 in.) long.

It is also called Orcheston grass, after a village on Salisbury Plain.

== Wildlife value ==
The food plant of the caterpillars of small heath (Coenonympha pamphilus), meadow brown (Maniola jurtina), gatekeeper (Pyronia tithonus) butterflies; common sun beetle (Amara aenea) – adults feed on the developing seeds, Eupelix cuspidata of the leafhopper family, and Myrmus miriformis a grassbug – feeds on young blades and developing seeds.

It is parasitised by the grass powdery mildew species Blumeria graminicola, which causes a white, powdery mildew on it.

== Photos ==
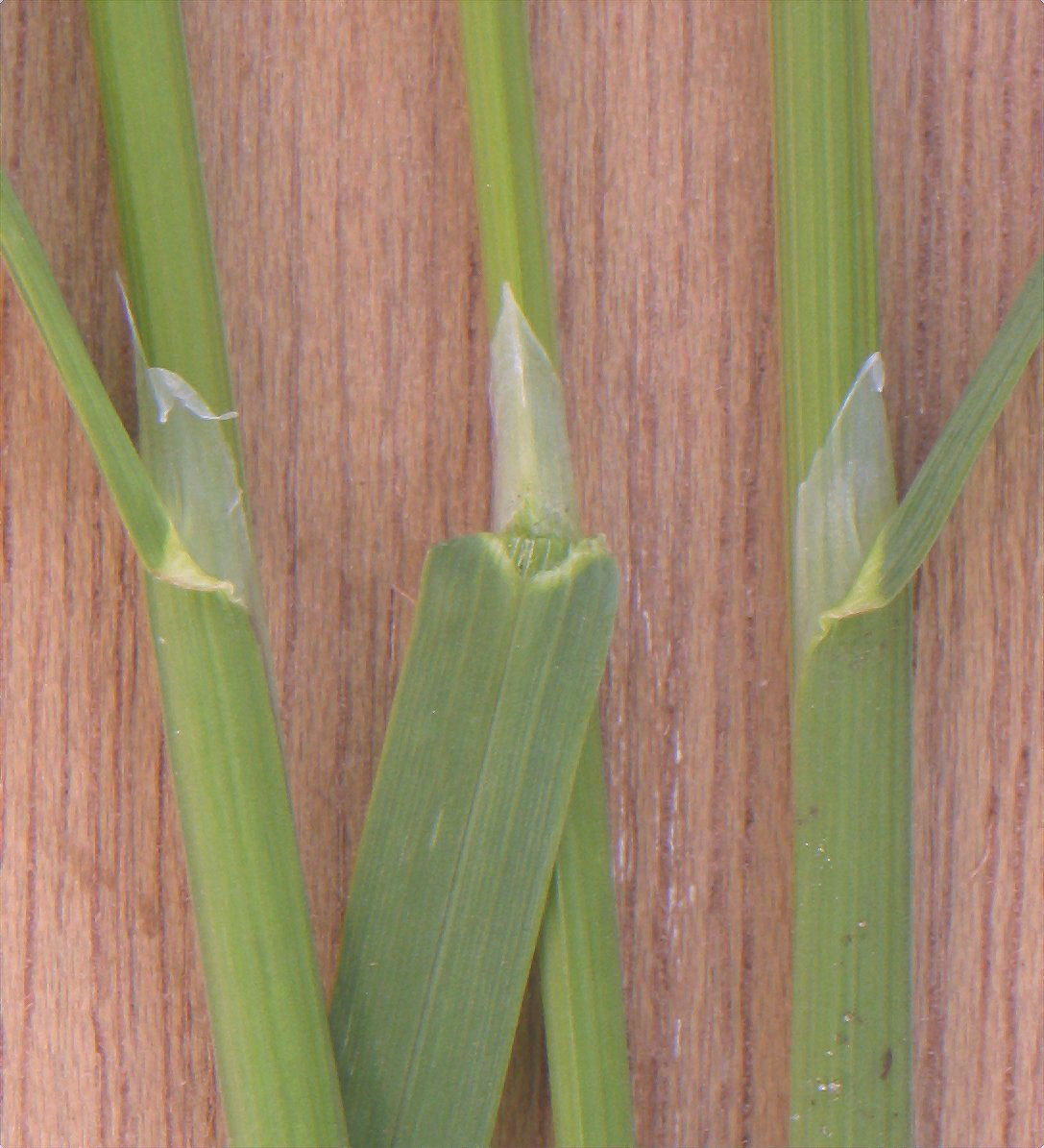
Pointed ligules 4–10 mm (0.2–0.4 in.) long

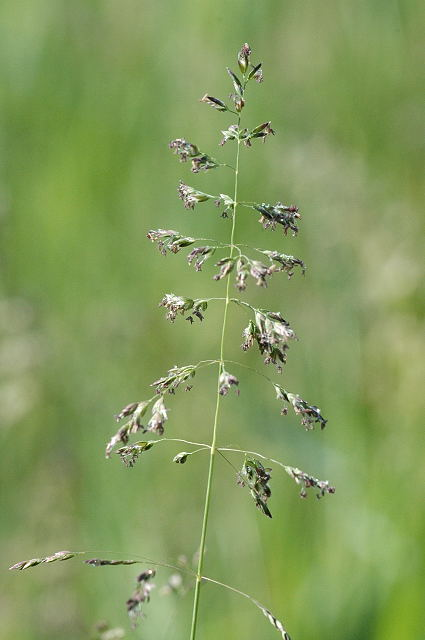
Loose, whorled green panicle, much branched, 15 cm (6 in.) long
