= Central Kentucky Blue Grass Seed Company Building =

- Central Kentucky Blue Grass Seed Co.
- U.S. National Register of Historic Places
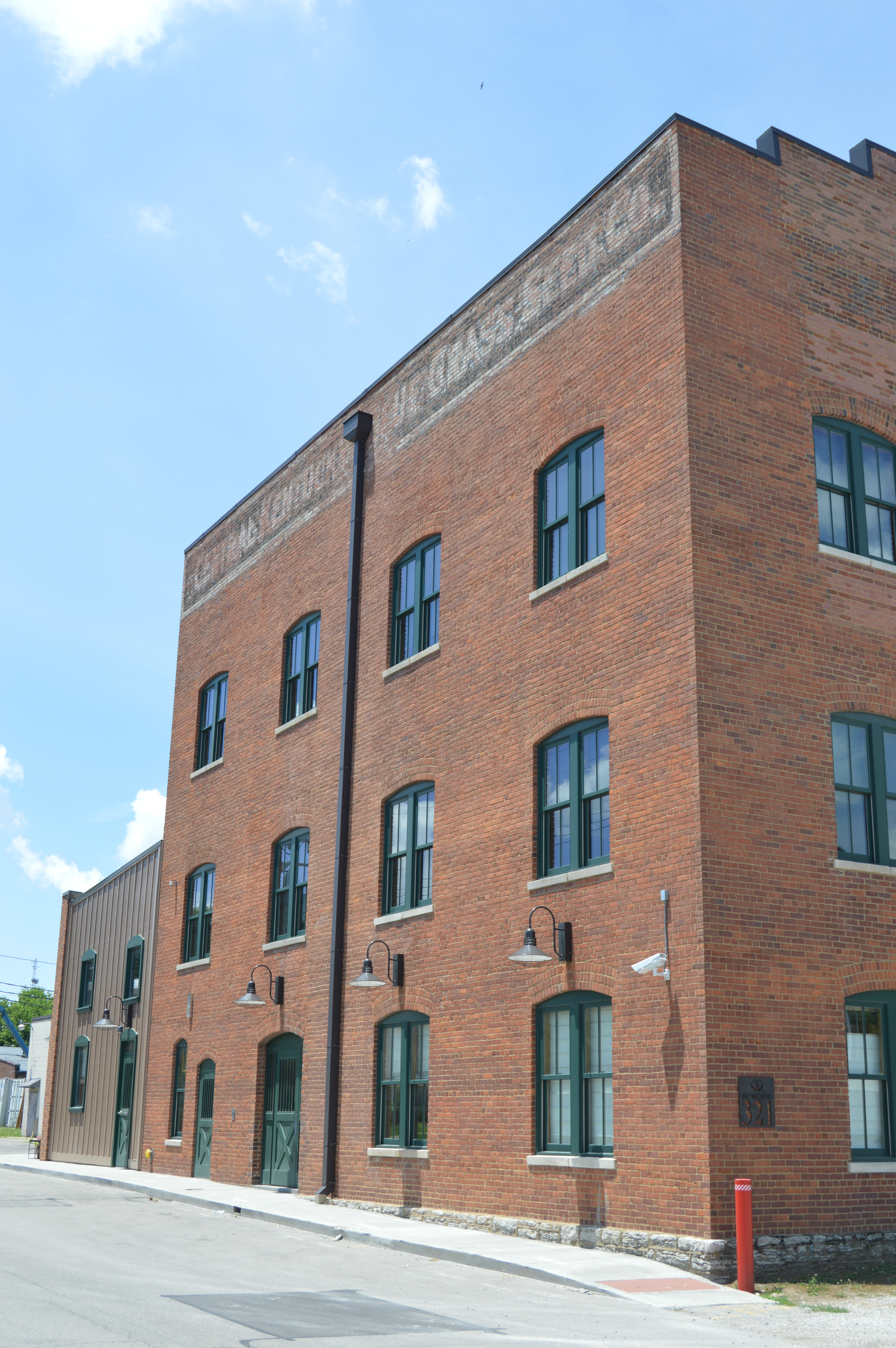
- Front

- Location within Kentucky Location within the United States
- Location: 321 Henry St., Lexington, Kentucky
- Coordinates: 38°3′29″N 84°30′2″W
- Area: less than one acre
- Architectural style: Early Commercial
- NRHP reference No.: 05000790
- Added to NRHP: August 3, 2005

The Central Kentucky Blue Grass Seed Co. is an Early Commercial building located at 321 Henry Street in Lexington, Kentucky. The company sold Kentucky blue grass seed. The building was listed on the National Register of Historic Places in 2005.

Its renovation earned a 2014 Historic Preservation Award from the Blue Grass Trust.

An identifier number, "FA-NS-1404", is associated with the property.
