= Nușfalău =

Nușfalău Szilágynagyfalu
- Commune
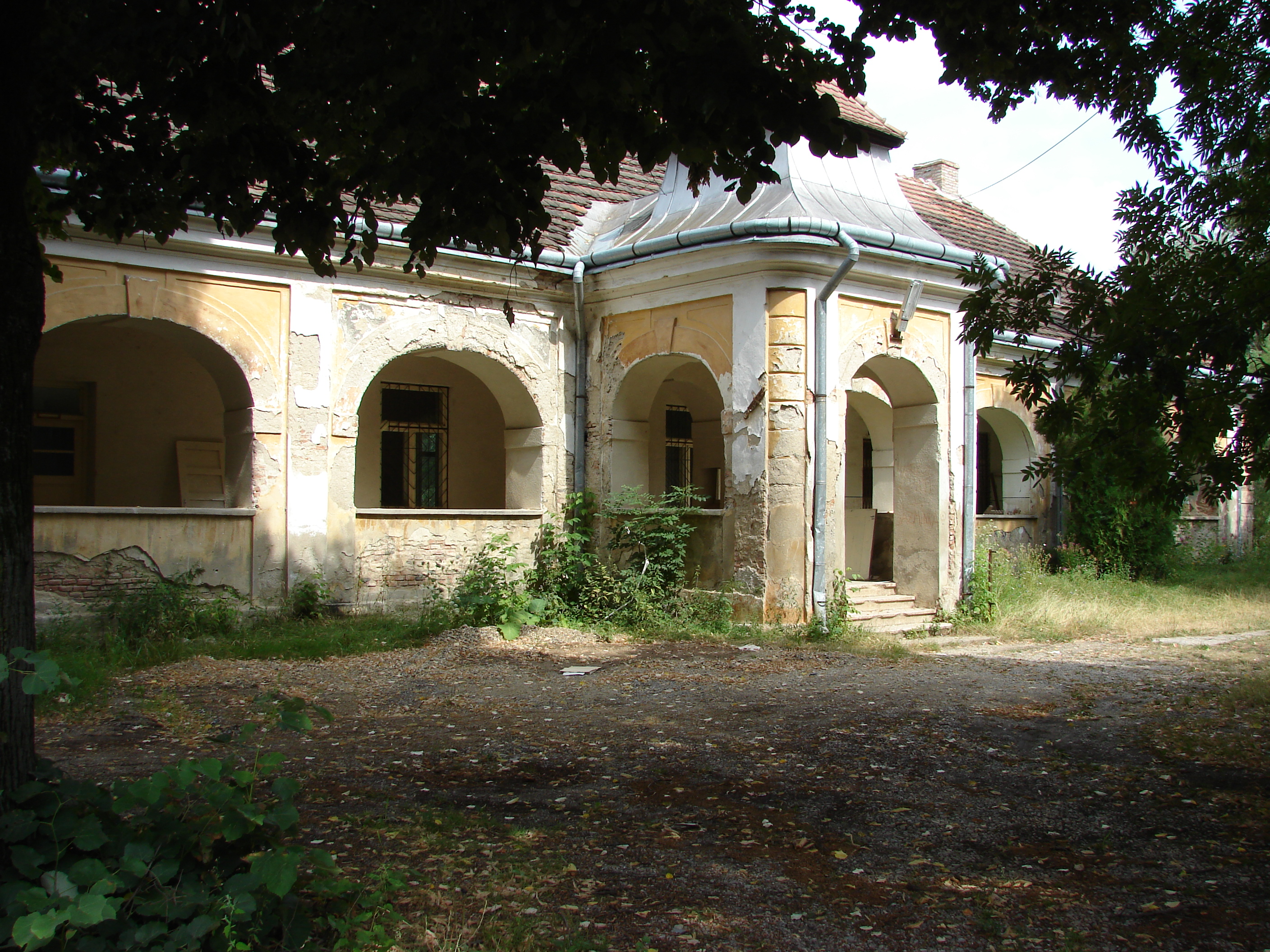
- Banffy Castle

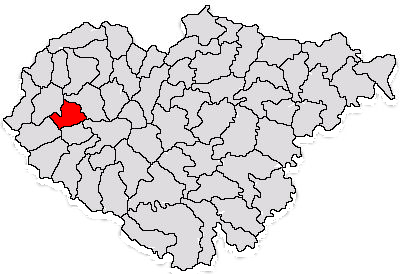
- Location in Sălaj County

- Location in Romania
- Coordinates: 47°11′58″N 22°42′28″E
- Country: Romania
- County: Sălaj

Government
  - Mayor (2020–2024): Radu Mate (Ind.)
- Area: 36.7 km^{2} (14.2 sq mi)
- Elevation: 215 m (705 ft)
- Population (2021-12-01): 3,772
  - Density: 103/km^{2} (266/sq mi)
- Time zone: UTC+02:00 (EET)
  - Summer (DST): UTC+03:00 (EEST)
- Postal code: 457260
- Area code: +(40) 0260
- Vehicle reg.: SJ
- Website: nusfalau.ro

Nușfalău (Hungarian: Szilágynagyfalu or Nagyfalu) is a commune located in Sălaj County, Crișana, Romania. It is composed of two villages, Bilghez (Bürgezd) and Nușfalău; Boghiș and Bozieș split off in 2005 to form Boghiș commune.

The commune is located in the western part of county, on the upper course of the Barcău River, about 35 kilometres (22 mi) from the county seat, Zalău.

== Sights ==
- Reformed Church in Nușfalău, built in the 15th century (1450), historic monument
- Banffy Castle in Nușfalău, built in the 18th century, historic monument
- Lapiș Forest Nature reserve, 430.40 ha (1,063.5 acres)

== See also ==
- Lapiș Forest
- Nușfalău massacre
