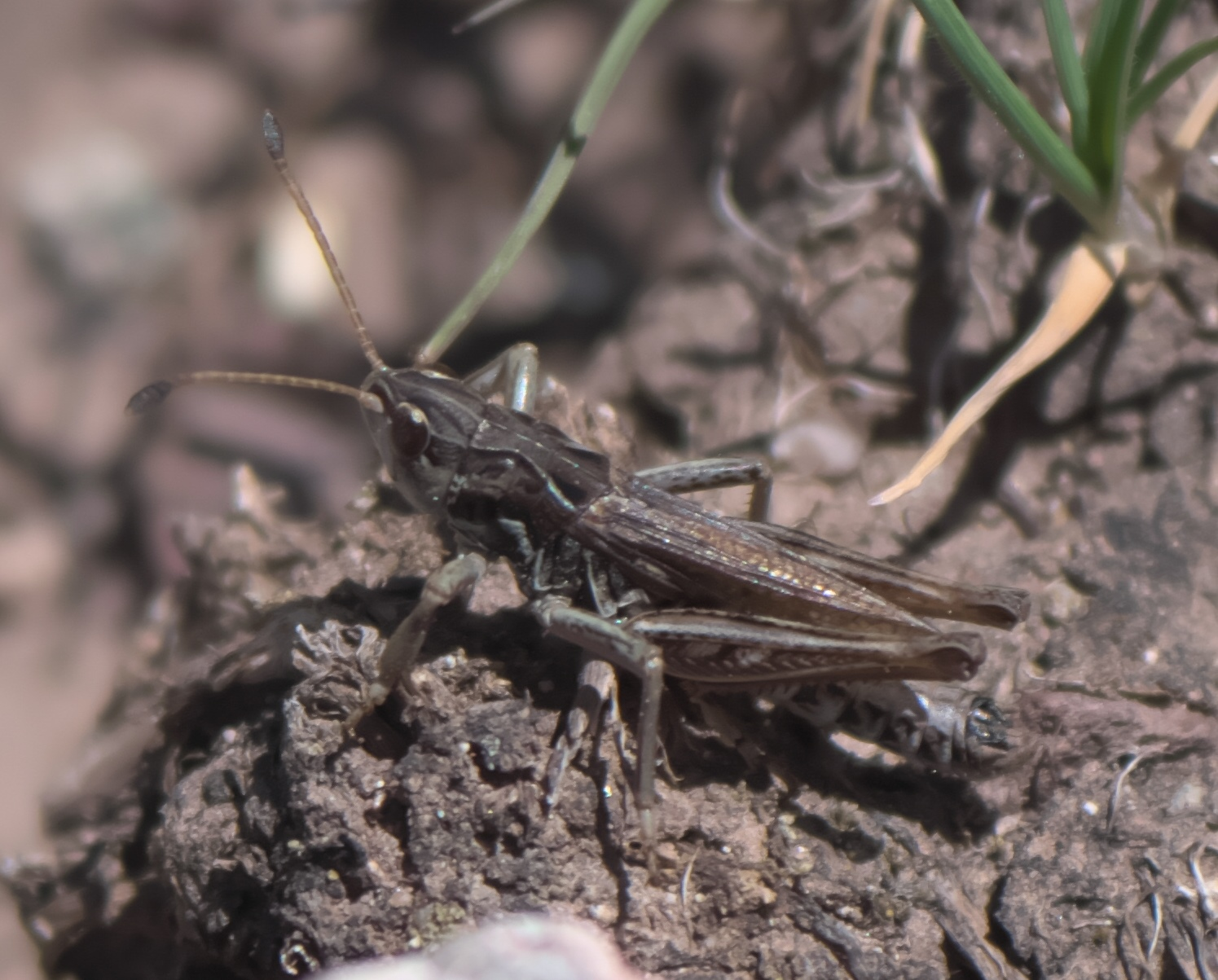

Scientific classification
- Domain: Eukaryota
- Kingdom: Animalia
- Phylum: Arthropoda
- Class: Insecta
- Order: Orthoptera
- Suborder: Caelifera
- Family: Acrididae
- Subfamily: Gomphocerinae
- Genus: Aeropedellus
- Species: A. clavatus

Binomial name
- Aeropedellus clavatus (Thomas, 1873)

= Aeropedellus clavatus =

Species of grasshopper

Aeropedellus clavatus, the club-horned grasshopper, is a species of slant-faced grasshopper in the family Acrididae. It is found in North America, from western Canada to the southwestern United States. It hatches in early spring.

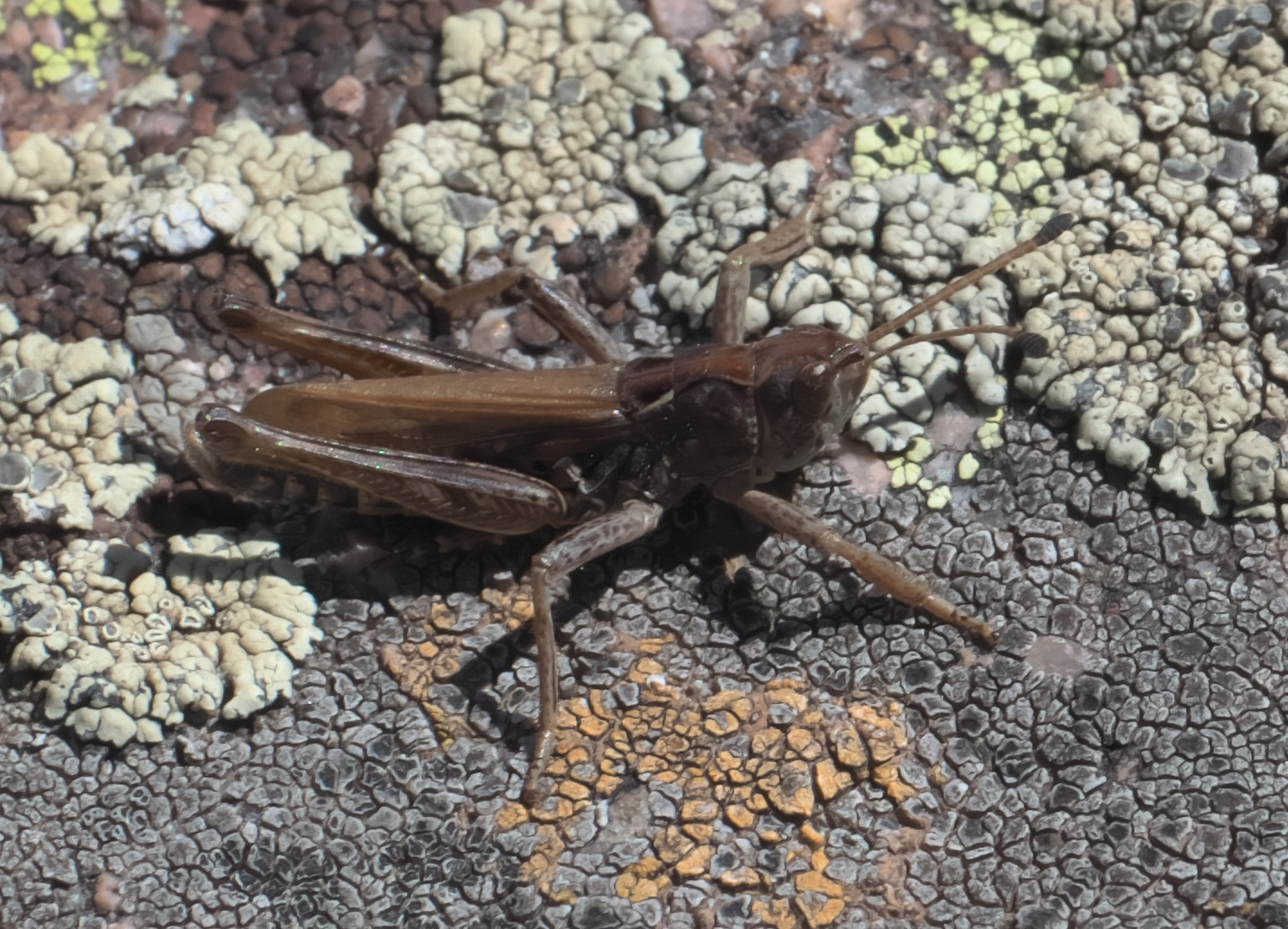
Club-horned grasshopper, Aeropedellus clavatus

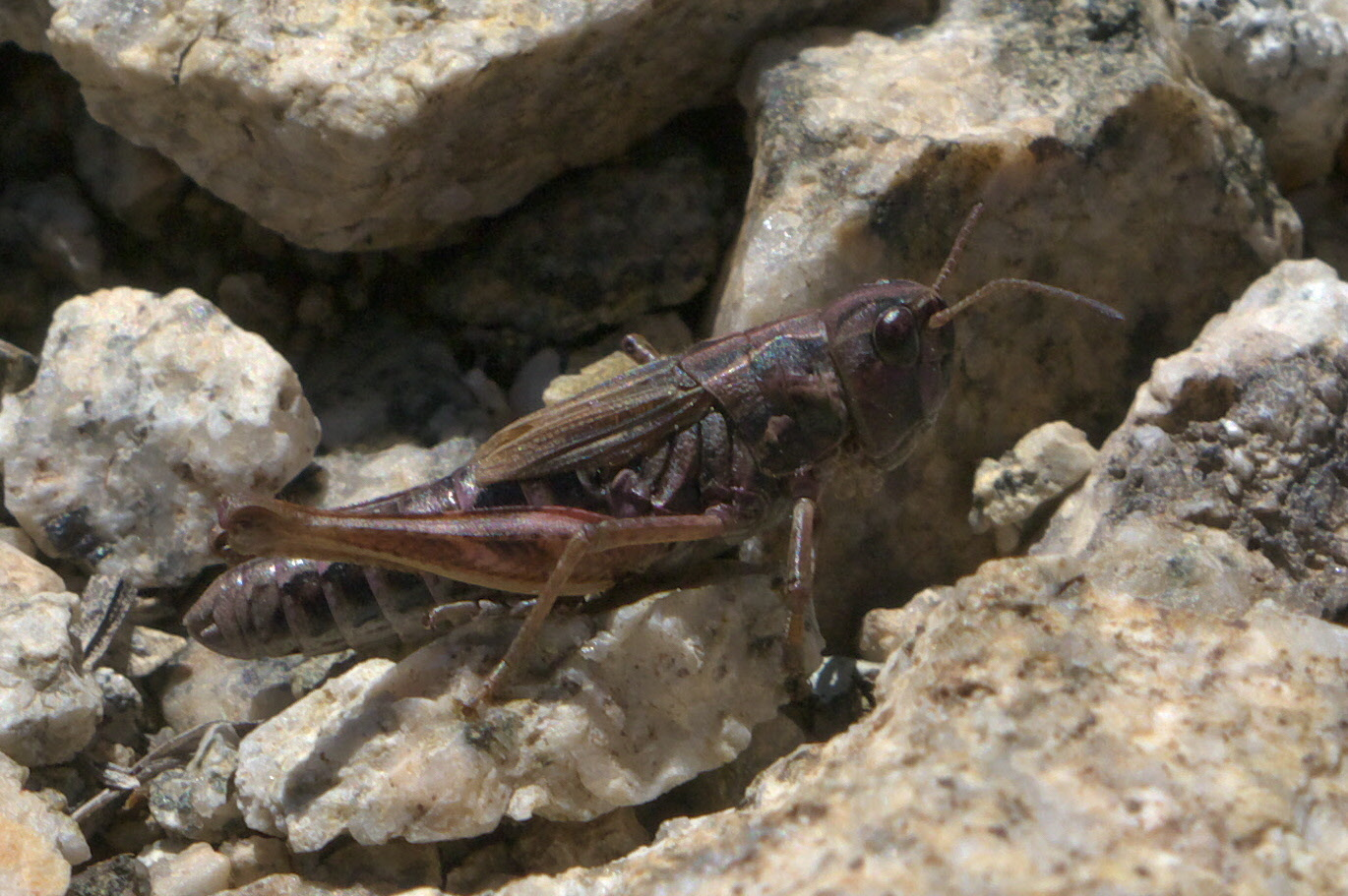
Club-horned grasshopper, Aeropedellus clavatus

== Description ==
=== Appearance ===
Adult club-horned grasshoppers are light brown, grey, or green, with black or silver markings. The species is named for their clavate (club-shaped) antennae, whose last six segments are larger and darker than the rest. A dark streak runs from the bottom of the compound eye to the base of the mandible, accompanied by a cream or light tan stream further forward. There is often a pale diagonal mark on the vertical sides of pronotum. There are median and lateral carinae (ridges) on the pronotum, cut by a groove behind the middle. The lateral carinae constrict near the middle of the prozona (the forewing-covering section of the pronotum), forming an hourglass-shaped marking, which is common among slant-faced grasshoppers. There are two oblong lateral fovolae (indentations) on the top of the head. The hind wing is clear, and the hind tibia is light brown.

The adult female has short wings that do not reach the middle of her abdomen, and cannot fly. She has white marks on her genae and is 19–22 mm (0.75–0.87 in) long. The adult male is 16–18 mm (0.63–0.71 in) long, and has either short wings or long wings; long-winged males fly. They tend to be significantly smaller at higher elevations than at lower elevations.

Club-horned grasshopper nymphs progress through four instars. All instars have strongly slanted faces, oblong lateral fovolae on their heads, a narrow light stripe above a thick dark stripe from behind the middle of the compound eye to the abdomen, a constriction in the lateral carinae near the middle of the pronotum (forming an hourglass shape), and hind femurs whose medial areas are entirely grey and whose lower marginal areas are pale grey. Female instars have flat antennae with little variation in width, but male instars' antennae become noticeably clavate beginning at the second instar.

=== Behavior ===
Adult club-horned grasshoppers generally stay in the same areas they hatched and developed. Long-winged adult males frequently fly for short times and distances; they might migrate between Adult males spend more time crawling on the ground than adult females, which are slower and spend long periods of time still on the ground. Adult females hop away from predators, while males hop away and then "prance", taking small hops without progressing further. Adult males stridulate, possibly for courtship, making a loud scratching sound. There is some evidence that long-winged males may migrate.

== Life cycle ==
An adult female lays pods of 5–8 eggs in soil among the roots of grasses or sedges. The eggs begin rapid embryonic development, until apparently ready to hatch, then enter diapause for the winter. There is one generation per year in plains habitats, while eggs in alpine habitats remain in diapause for two or three winters before hatching. The eggs hatch in very early spring, within a three-to-four–week period, significantly earlier than most other grasshopper species in the same regions, and quickly progress through all instars, becoming adults in about 30–42 days. They have better access to plants to eat than later-hatching species, but have less protection in numbers from predators. They primarily eat grasses and sedges, and their seeds and glumes. The most favored food plant when present is Kentucky bluegrass (Poa pratensis).

== Distribution and habitat ==
The club-horned grasshopper is found from the grasslands of western Canada and the northern United States to the mountains of Arizona and New Mexico, commonly in northern mixed-grass prairies, mountain meadows, and forested foothills. It is the most common and widely distributed grassland grasshopper species in the Canadian prairies.

== Economic effects ==
The club-horned grasshopper is not generally an economically important pest, but it may occasionally become dense in favorable conditions. Dense populations have been known to cause severe damage to forage grasses and cereal grains.
