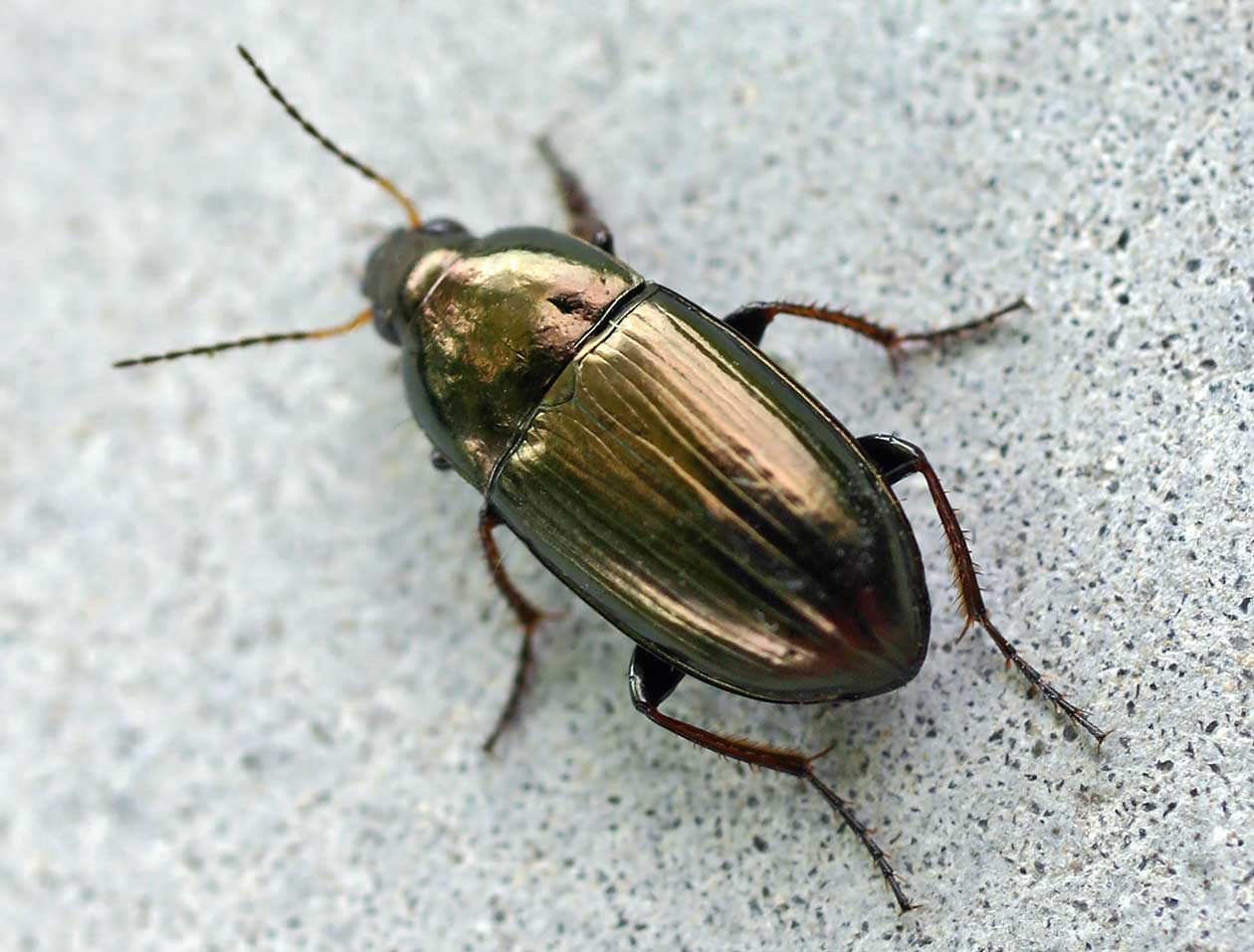

Scientific classification
- Kingdom: Animalia
- Phylum: Arthropoda
- Class: Insecta
- Order: Coleoptera
- Suborder: Adephaga
- Family: Carabidae
- Genus: Amara
- Species: A. aenea

Binomial name
- Amara aenea (De Geer, 1774)

Synonyms
- Amara devincta Casey, 1918; Carabus aeneus DeGeer, 1774

= Amara aenea =

Species of beetle

Amara aenea is a ground beetle common in almost the whole of Europe and Northern Asia. Its range covers also parts of Northern Africa. It is known as the common sun beetle.

A. aenea adults are predators that eat other insects, such as the apple maggot and soybean aphid, which are considered pests by the agriculture industry. As such, this beetle is under study for use in integrated pest management. Larvae are omnivorous.

The adults feed on the developing seed of Poa trivialis and smooth meadow grass Poa pratensis.
