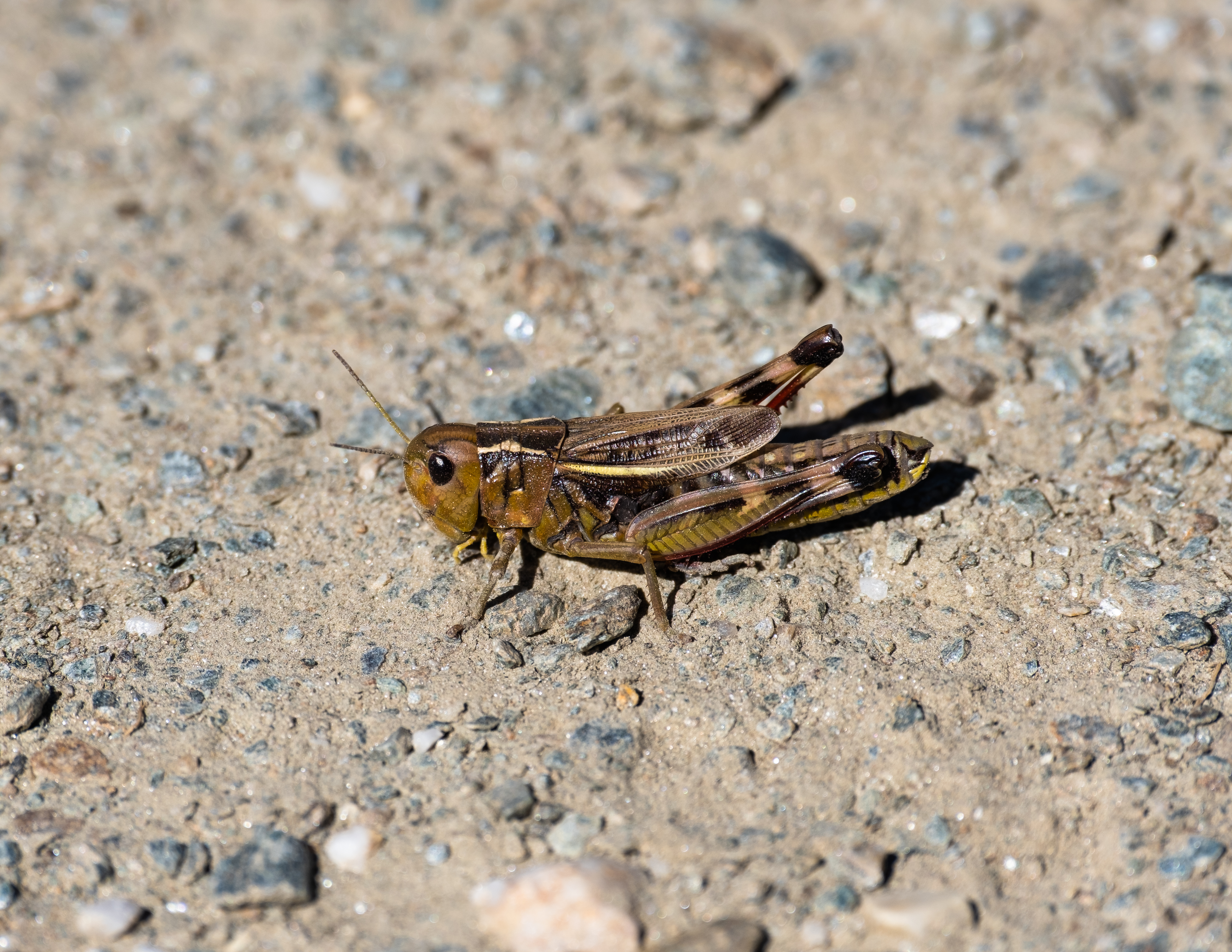
- Aeropedellus variegatus in Saint-Luc, Switzerland

Scientific classification
- Kingdom: Animalia
- Phylum: Arthropoda
- Clade: Pancrustacea
- Class: Insecta
- Order: Orthoptera
- Suborder: Caelifera
- Superfamily: Acridoidea
- Family: Acrididae
- Subfamily: Gomphocerinae
- Genus: Aeropedellus
- Species: A. variegatus

Binomial name
- Aeropedellus variegatus (Fischer von Waldheim, 1846)

= Aeropedellus variegatus =

Species of grasshopper

Aeropedellus variegatus is a species of Palearctic grasshoppers in the tribe Gomphocerini.

== Subspecies ==
The Orthoptera Species File includes:

- A. variegatus fasciatus Mistshenko, 1951
- A. variegatus borealis Mistshenko, 1951
- A. variegatus gelidus Mistshenko, 1951
- A. variegatus minutus Mistshenko, 1951
- A. variegatus variegatus (Fischer von Waldheim, 1846): extends into mainland western Europe, where it may be called Le Gomphocère des moraines (Fr) or Alpen-Keulenschrecke (De).

Close-up of Aeropedellus variegatus
