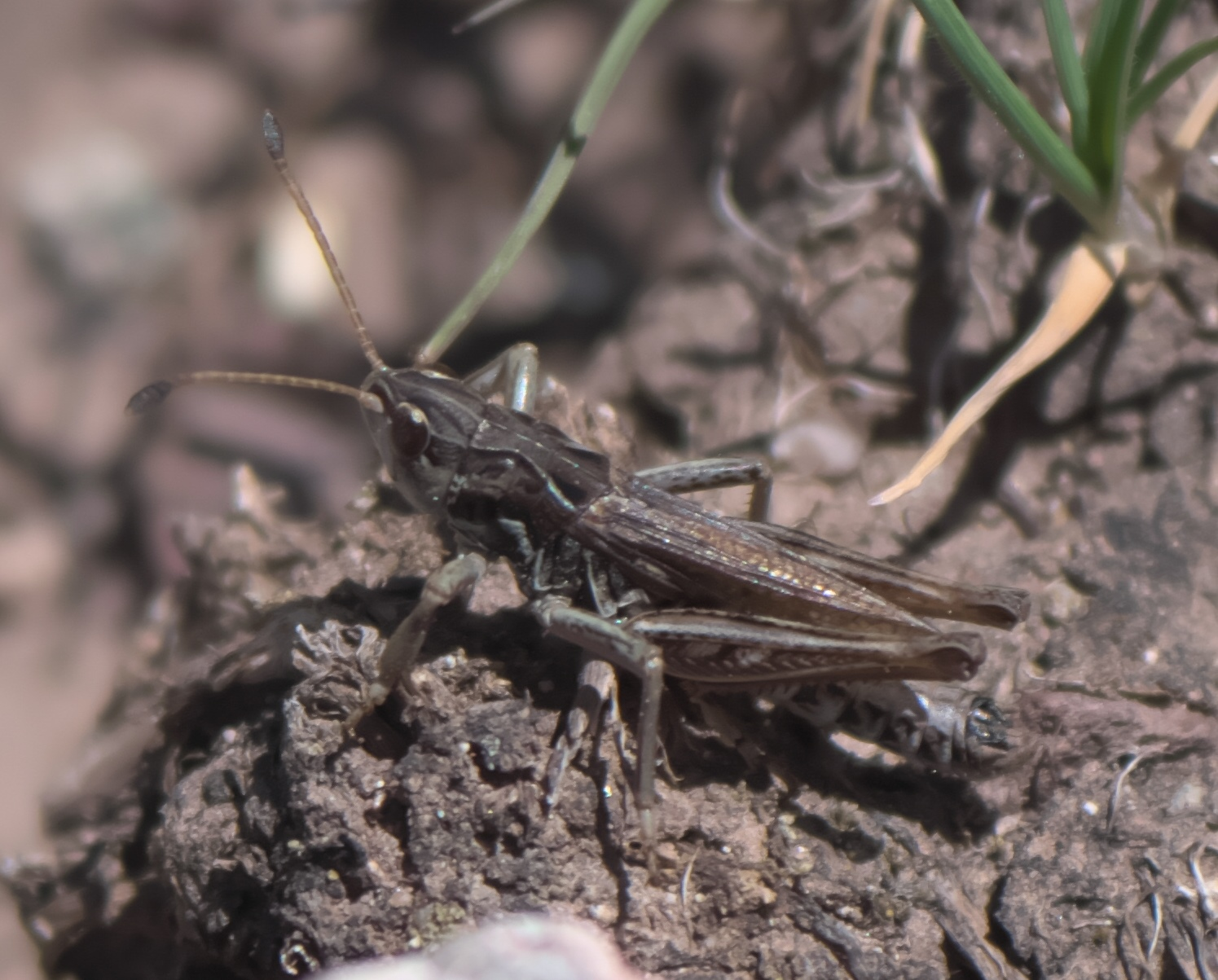
- Aeropedellus clavatus

Scientific classification
- Domain: Eukaryota
- Kingdom: Animalia
- Phylum: Arthropoda
- Class: Insecta
- Order: Orthoptera
- Suborder: Caelifera
- Family: Acrididae
- Subfamily: Gomphocerinae
- Genus: Aeropedellus; Hebard, 1935

= Aeropedellus =

Genus of grasshoppers

Aeropedellus is a genus of slant-faced grasshoppers in the family Acrididae. There are more than 20 described species in Aeropedellus.

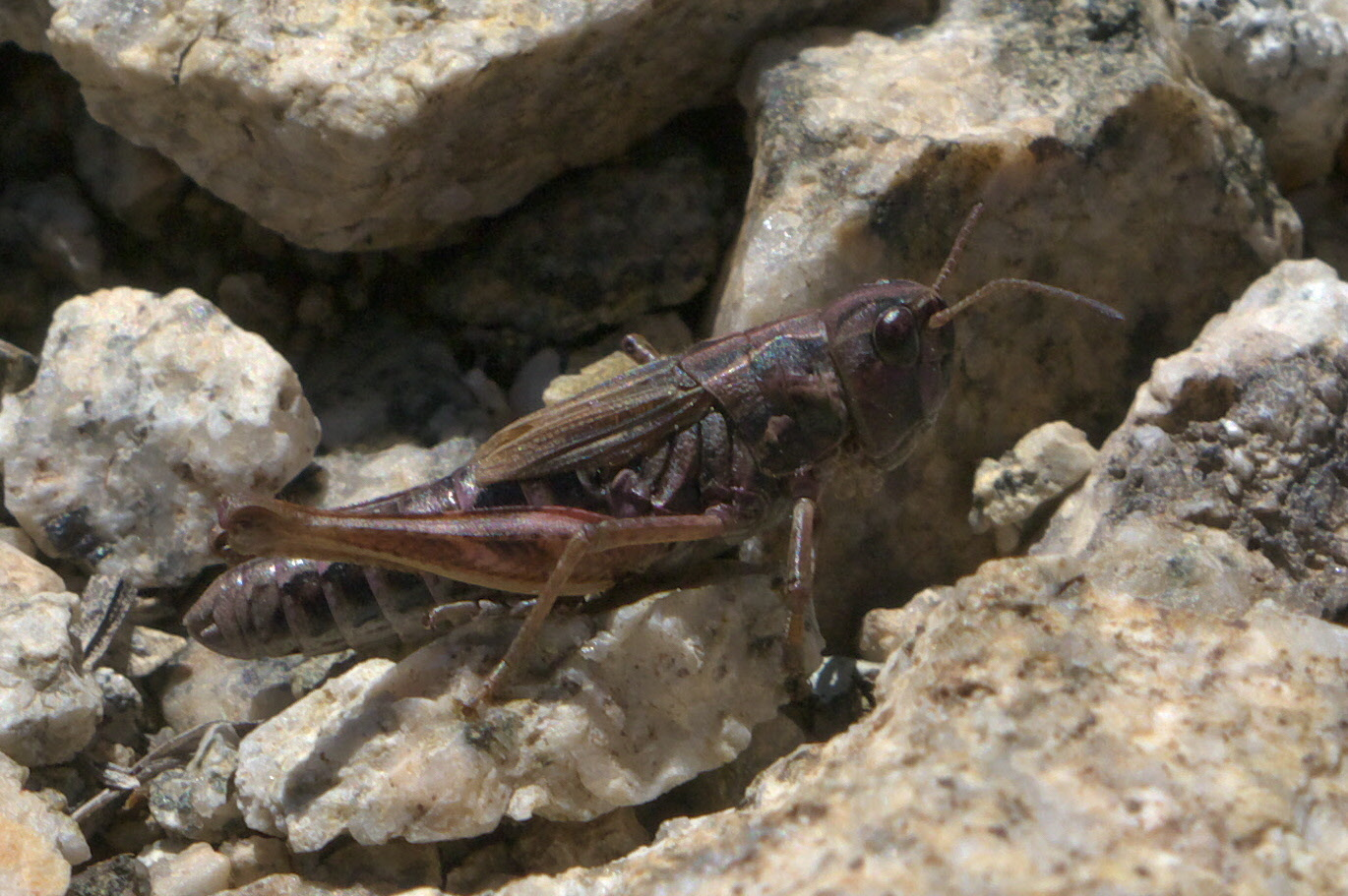
Aeropedellus clavatus

== Species ==
These 22 species belong to the genus Aeropedellus:

- Aeropedellus albilineatus Zheng, Li & Ding, 1995
- Aeropedellus ampliseptus Liang & Jia, 1992
- Aeropedellus arcticus Hebard, 1935
- Aeropedellus baliolus Mistshenko, 1951
- Aeropedellus chogsomjavi Altanchimeg, Chen & Nonnaitzb, 2014
- Aeropedellus clavatus (Thomas, 1873) (club-horned grasshopper) - type species (as Gomphocerus clavatus Thomas)
- Aeropedellus gaolanshanensis Zheng, 1984
- Aeropedellus helanshanensis Zheng, 1992
- Aeropedellus liupanshanensis Zheng, 1981
- Aeropedellus longdensis Zheng & He, 1994
- Aeropedellus longipennis Zheng, 1992
- Aeropedellus mahuangshanensis Zheng, 1992
- Aeropedellus nigrepiproctus Kang & Chen, 1990
- Aeropedellus nigrilineatus Zheng & Ma, 1995
- Aeropedellus ningxiaensis Zheng, 1993
- Aeropedellus prominemarginis Zheng, 1981
- Aeropedellus reuteri (Miram, 1907)
- Aeropedellus turcicus Karabag, 1959
- Aeropedellus variegatus (Fischer von Waldheim, 1846)
- Aeropedellus volgensis (Predtechenskii, 1928)
- Aeropedellus xilinensis Liu & Xi, 1986
- Aeropedellus zhengi Yang, 1994
