= Cehei Pond =

Nature Reserve situated in north-western Romania

- Balta Cehei
- IUCN category IV (habitat/species management area)
- Location within Romania
- Location: Romania; Sălaj County
- Nearest city: Șimleu Silvaniei
- Coordinates: 47.267°N 22.755°E
- Area: 18.20 hectares (45.0 acres)
- Established: 2000

Cehei Pond Nature Reserve (Romanian: Balta Cehei) is situated in north-western Romania, in Crasna river floodplain, in Sălaj County and is a protected area with aquatic vegetation and fauna specific to such area.

== Fauna ==
Birds: little bittern (Ixobrychus minutus), mallard (Anas platyrhinchos), great reed warbler (Acrocephalus arundinaceus), white stork (Ciconia ciconia), common moorhen (Gallinula chloropus);

Frogs: yellow-bellied toad (Bombina veriegata), European fire-bellied toad (Bombina bomina);

Reptiles: European green lizard (Lacerta viridis)

== Flora ==
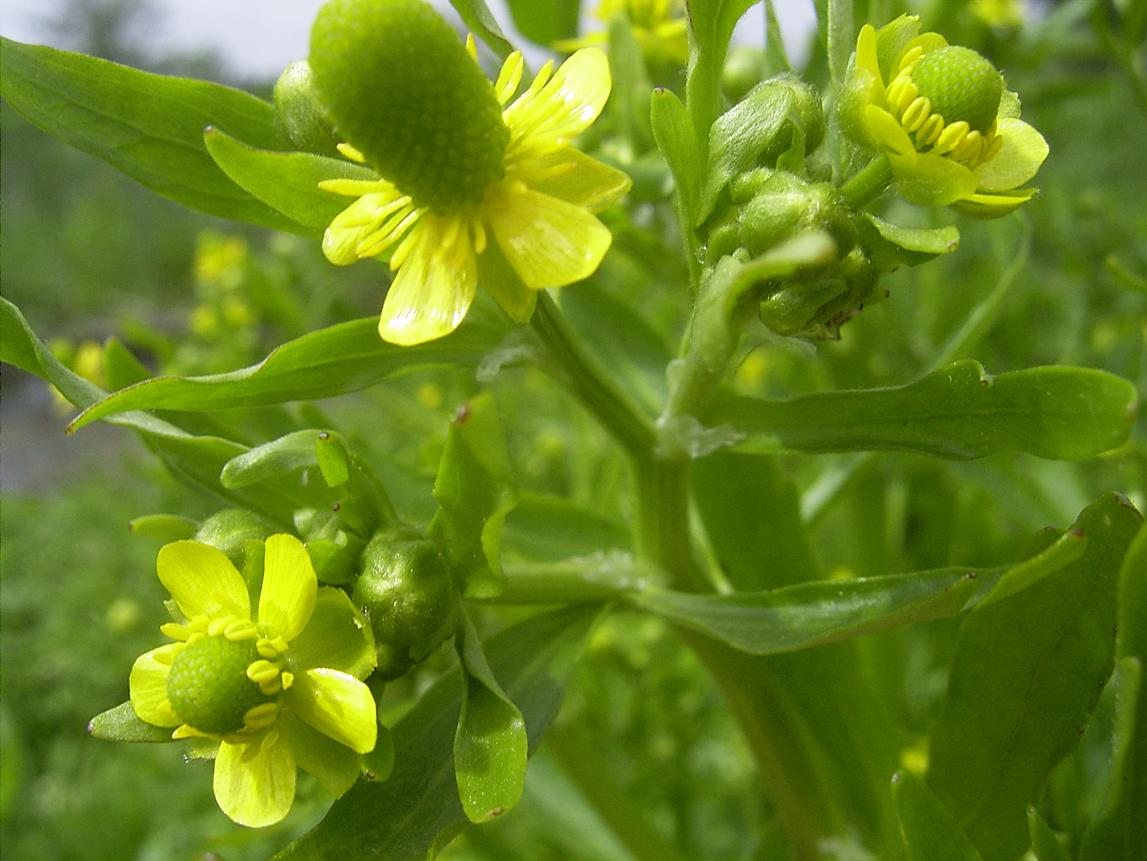
Ranunculus sceleratus (flowers)

The Cehei Pond represents a very favorable place for the development of highly diverse flora, with numerous rare species.

Tree species: grey willow (Salix cinerea), black alder (Alnus glutinosa), goat willow (Salix caprea);

Species of grass: Hydrocharis (Hydrocharis morsus-ranae), Scutellaria galericulata (Scutellaria galericulata var. epilobiifolia), Ranunculus sceleratus (Ranunculus sceleratus L.), Utricularia vulgaris (Utricularia vulgaris L.), Phragmites (Phragmites australis), Typha (Typha latifolia), Utricularia vulgaris (Utricularia vulgaris L.).

== See also ==
- Lapiș Forest

== Image gallery ==
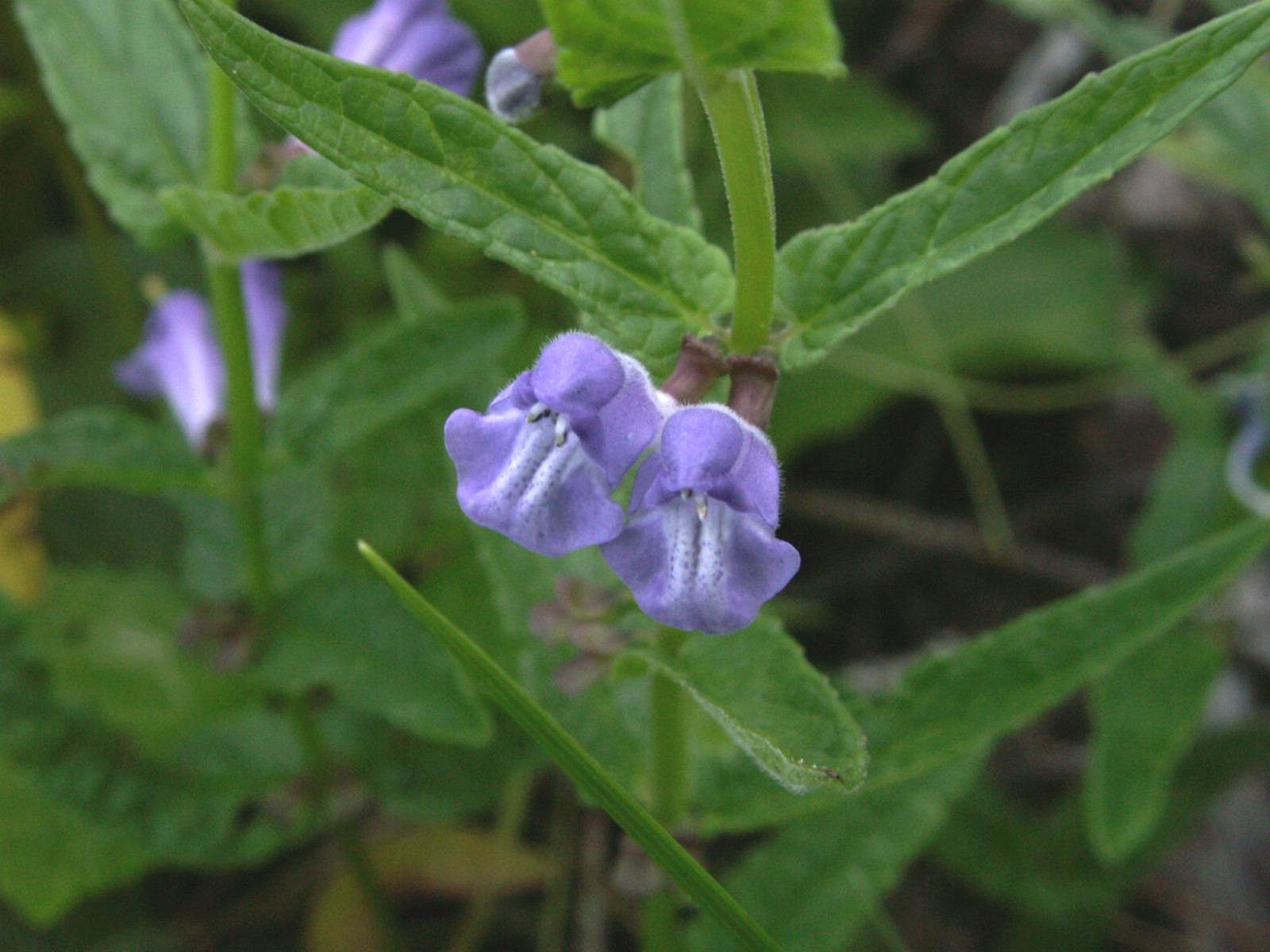
Scutellaria galericulata

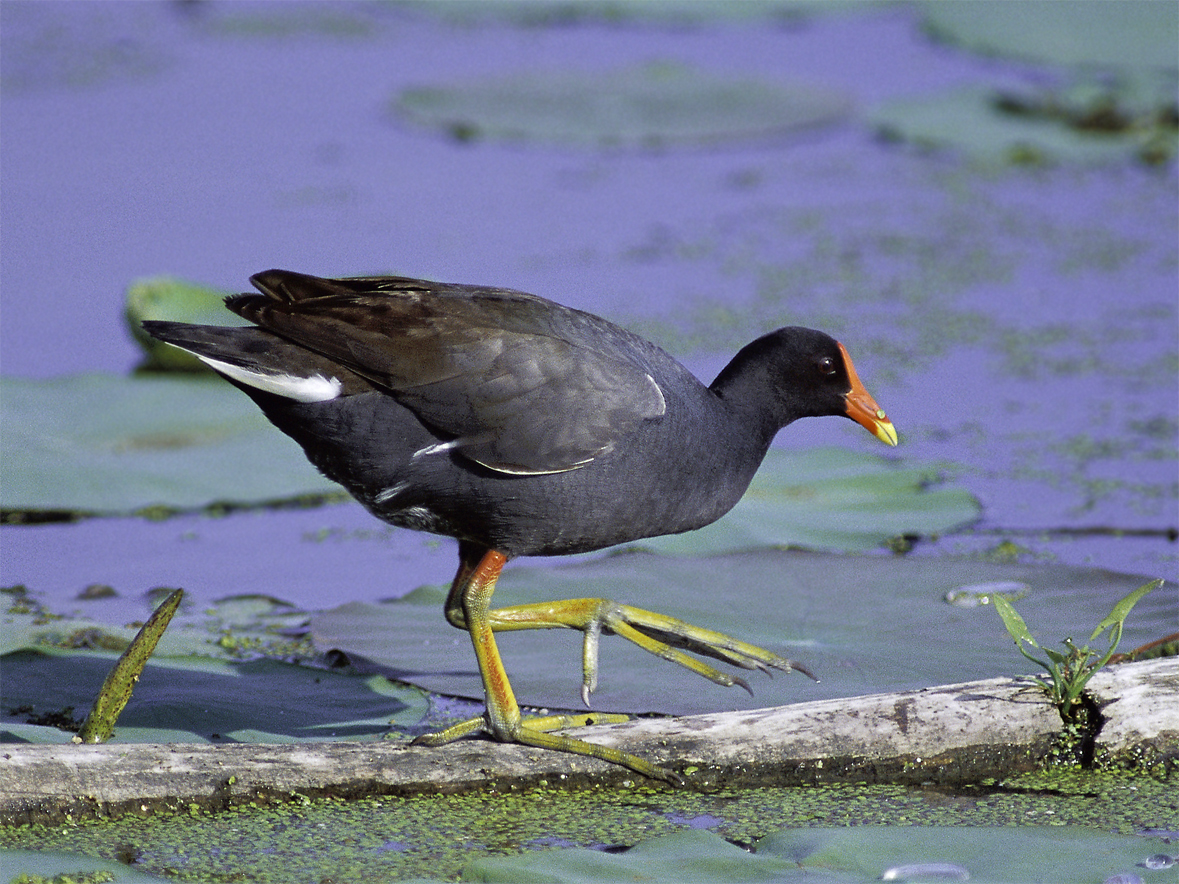
Common moorhen

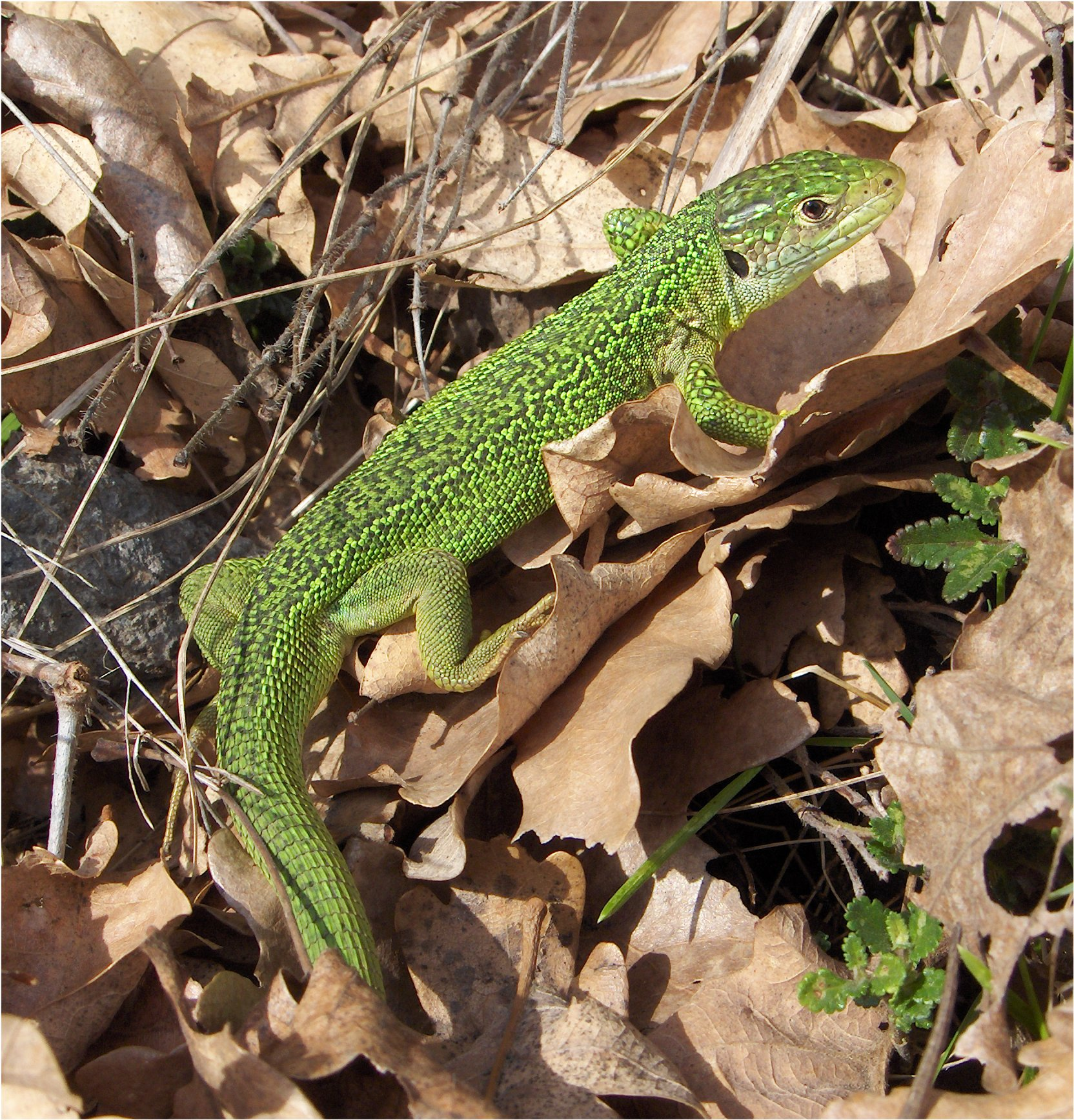
European green lizard
