= Eupelix =

Scientific classification
- Domain: Eukaryota
- Kingdom: Animalia
- Phylum: Arthropoda
- Class: Insecta
- Order: Hemiptera
- Suborder: Auchenorrhyncha
- Family: Cicadellidae
- Subfamily: Deltocephalinae
- Tribe: Eupelicini
- Genus: Eupelix; Germar, 1821

Genus of true bugs

Eupelix is a genus of true bug belonging to the family Cicadellidae.

The genus was first described by Germar in 1821.

The species of this genus are found in Europe.

Species:

- Eupelix cuspidata (Fabricius, 1775)
