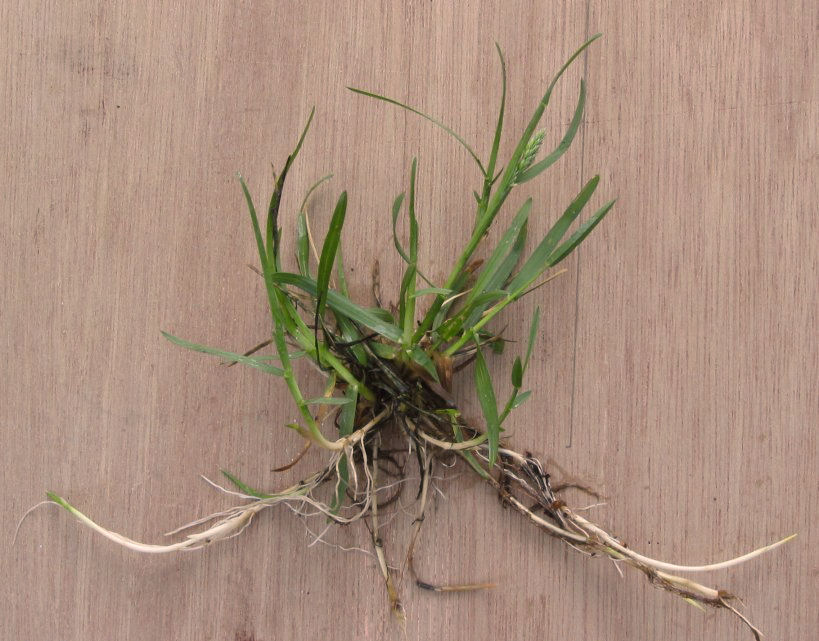

Conservation status
- Least Concern (IUCN 3.1)

- Secure (NatureServe)

Scientific classification
- Kingdom: Plantae
- Clade: Tracheophytes
- Clade: Angiosperms
- Clade: Monocots
- Clade: Commelinids
- Order: Poales
- Family: Poaceae
- Subfamily: Pooideae
- Genus: Poa
- Species: P. pratensis

Binomial name
- Poa pratensis L.

= Poa pratensis =

Species of plant

Poa pratensis, commonly known as Kentucky bluegrass (or blue grass), smooth meadow-grass, or common meadow-grass, is a perennial species of grass native to practically all of Europe, North Asia and the mountains of Algeria, Morocco, and Tunisia. There is disagreement about its native status in North America, with some sources considering it native and others stating the Spanish Empire brought the seeds of Kentucky bluegrass to the New World in mixtures with other grasses. It is a very popular lawn grass in North America with the species being spread over all of the cool, humid parts of the United States. In its native range, Poa pratensis forms a valuable pasture plant, characteristic of well-drained, fertile soil. It is also used for making lawns in parks and gardens and has established itself as a common invasive weed across cool moist temperate climates like the Pacific Northwest and the Northeastern United States. When found on native grasslands in Canada, for example, it is considered an unwelcome exotic plant, and is indicative of a disturbed and degraded landscape.

== Taxonomy ==
Poa pratensis was one of the many species described by Carl Linnaeus in his landmark work Species Plantarum in 1753. Poa is Greek for fodder and pratensis is derived from pratum, Latin for meadow. The name Kentucky bluegrass derives from its flower heads, which are blue when the plant is allowed to grow to its natural height of 60 to 90 cm (2 to 3 feet).

Poa pratensis is the type species of the grass family Poaceae.

Five subspecies are accepted.

- Poa pratensis subsp. dolichophylla (Hack.) Portal – Corsica
- Poa pratensis subsp. jordanii Portal – eastern France
- Poa pratensis subsp. oligantha Charit. – western Siberia
- Poa pratensis subsp. pratensis – temperate North America and Eurasia; Yemen, the Philippines, Java, and New Guinea
- Poa pratensis subsp. turfosa (Litv.) Vorosch. – Baltic States and northern and Central European Russia

== Description ==
Poa pratensis is a herbaceous perennial plant 30–70 centimetres (12–28 in) tall. The leaves have boat-shaped tips, narrowly linear, up to 20 centimetres (8 in) long and 3–5 millimetres (0.12–0.20 in) broad, smooth or slightly roughened, with a rounded to truncate ligule 1–2 millimetres (0.039–0.079 in) long. The conical panicle is 5–20 centimetres (2–8 in) long, with 3 to 5 branches in the basal whorls; the oval spikelets are 3–6 millimetres (0.12–0.24 in) long with 2 to 5 florets, and are purplish-green or grey. They are in flower from May to July, compared to annual meadowgrass (Poa annua) which is in flower for eight months of the year. Poa pratensis has a fairly prominent mid-vein (center of the blade).

The ligule is extremely short and square-ended, making a contrast with annual meadowgrass (Poa annua) and rough meadowgrass (Poa trivialis) in which it is silvery and pointed. The Kentucky bluegrass is a dark green/blue compared to the apple-green color of Poa annua and Poa trivialis.

The rootstock is creeping, with runners (rhizomes). The broad, blunt leaves tend to spread at the base, forming close mats.

== Ecology ==
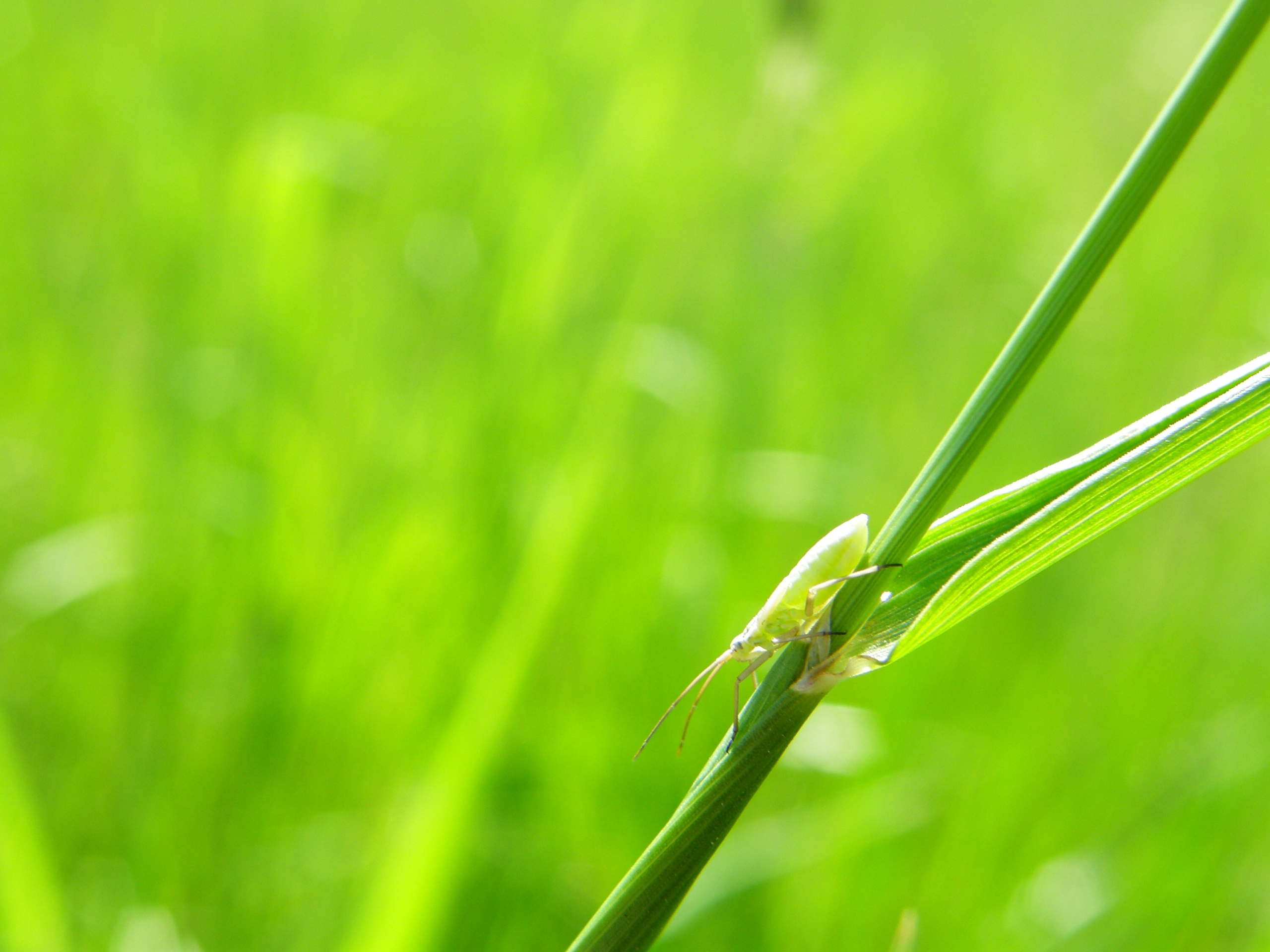
Myrmus miriformis in Přerov, Czech Republic

Poa pratensis is among the food plants of the caterpillars of the meadow brown (Maniola jurtina), gatekeeper (Pyronia tithonus), and pepper-and-salt skipper butterflies; the common sun beetle (Amara aenea) (adults feed on the developing seeds), the leafhopper Eupelix cuspidata, the grassbug Myrmus miriformis (feeds on young blades and developing seeds), and the club-horned grasshopper (Aeropedellus clavatus) (feeds on the blades, seeds, and glumes).

Poa pratensis is host to a number of fungi, including Claviceps purpurea, which causes ergotism when consumed, Drechslera poae, Epichloë typhina, Phaeoseptoria poae, Puccinia brachypodii var. poae-nemoralis, Stagonospora montagnei, Stagonospora nodorum and Wojnowicia hirta.

== Cultivation and production ==
The Central Kentucky Blue Grass Seed Company Building is on the National Register of Historic Places. Since the 1950s and early 1960s, 90% of Kentucky bluegrass seed in the United States has been produced on specialist farms in Idaho, Oregon and Washington.

During the 1990s, botanists began experimenting with hybrids of Poa pratensis and Texas bluegrass (P. arachnifera), with the goal of creating a drought and heat-resistant lawn grass. In warm climates, such hybrids may remain green year-round.

Bella Bluegrass is a brand-named dwarf variant of Poa pratentis developed by the University of Nebraska–Lincoln. It has relatively deep roots and propagates relatively rapidly horizontally from its root system but grows to only 2–5 inches (5–13 cm) in above-ground height, basically eliminating the need for mowing lawns that use it. It cannot be reproduced by seed and thus depends on sod plugs or sprigging for its production.

== NFL playing surfaces ==
- Huntington Bank Field in Cleveland, Ohio
- Empower Field at Mile High in Denver, Colorado
- New Highmark Stadium in Orchard Park, New York
- Acrisure Stadium in Pittsburgh, Pennsylvania

== MLB playing surfaces ==
- Yankee Stadium in Bronx, New York
- Oriole Park at Camden Yards in Baltimore, Maryland
- Progressive Field in Cleveland, Ohio
- Angel Stadium in Anaheim, California
- Busch Stadium in St. Louis, Missouri
- Citizens Bank Park in Philadelphia, Pennsylvania
- American Family Field in Milwaukee, Wisconsin
- Nationals Park in Washington, D.C.
- Citi Field in Queens, New York
- Comerica Park in Detroit, Michigan
- Guaranteed Rate Field in Chicago, Illinois
- Target Field in Minneapolis, Minnesota
- PNC Park in Pittsburgh, Pennsylvania
- Fenway Park in Boston, Massachusetts
- Oakland Coliseum in Oakland, California
- Coors Field in Denver, Colorado (Kentucky Bluegrass/Perennial Ryegrass Blend)
- T-Mobile Park in Seattle, Washington (Kentucky Bluegrass/Perennial Ryegrass Blend)
- Great American Ball Park in Cincinnati, Ohio (Kentucky Bluegrass Blend)
- Wrigley Field in Chicago, Illinois (Kentucky Bluegrass/Clover Blend)
- Kauffman Stadium in Kansas City, Missouri (Kentucky Bluegrass/Perennial Ryegrass Blend)

== Gallery ==
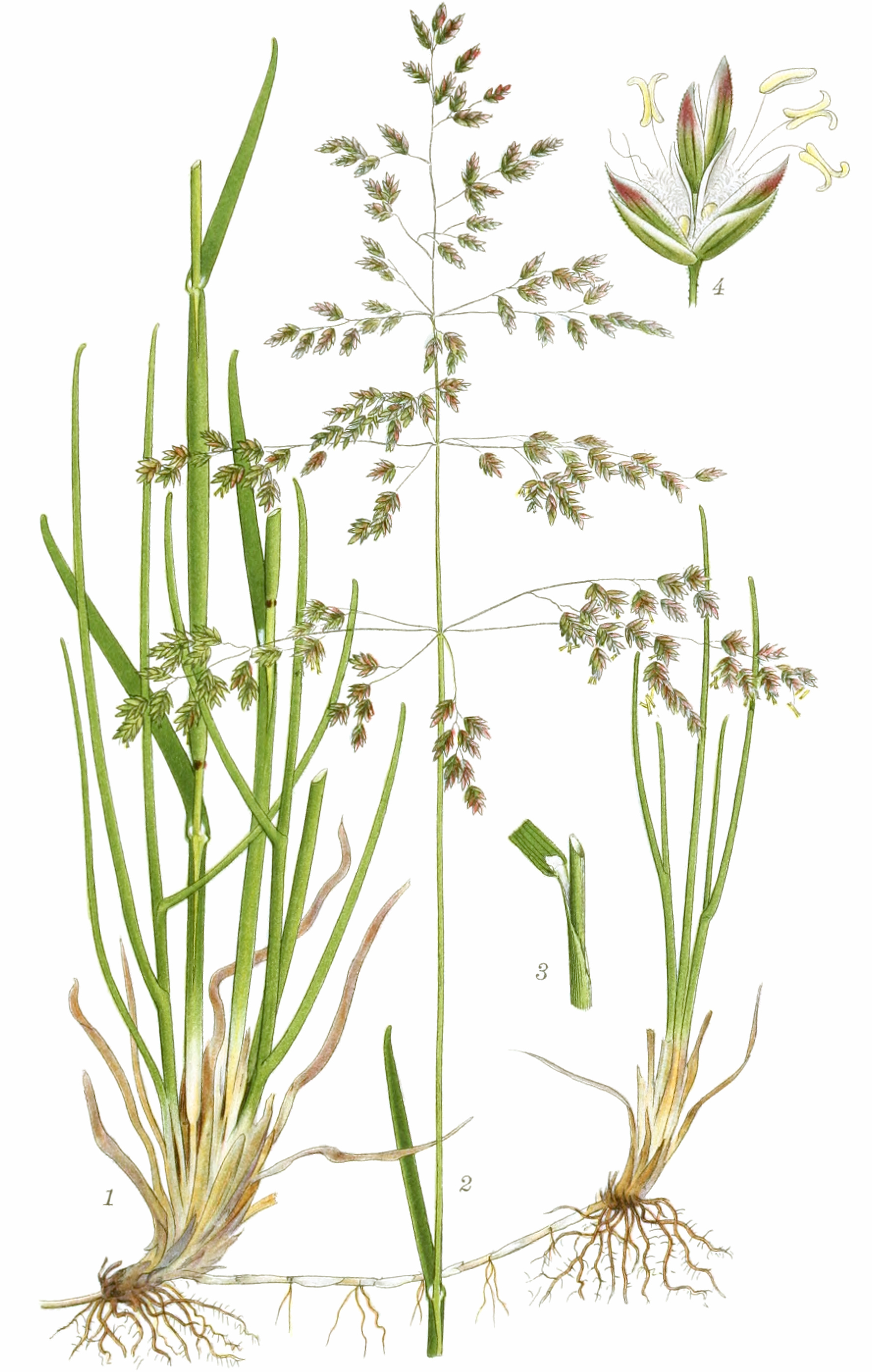

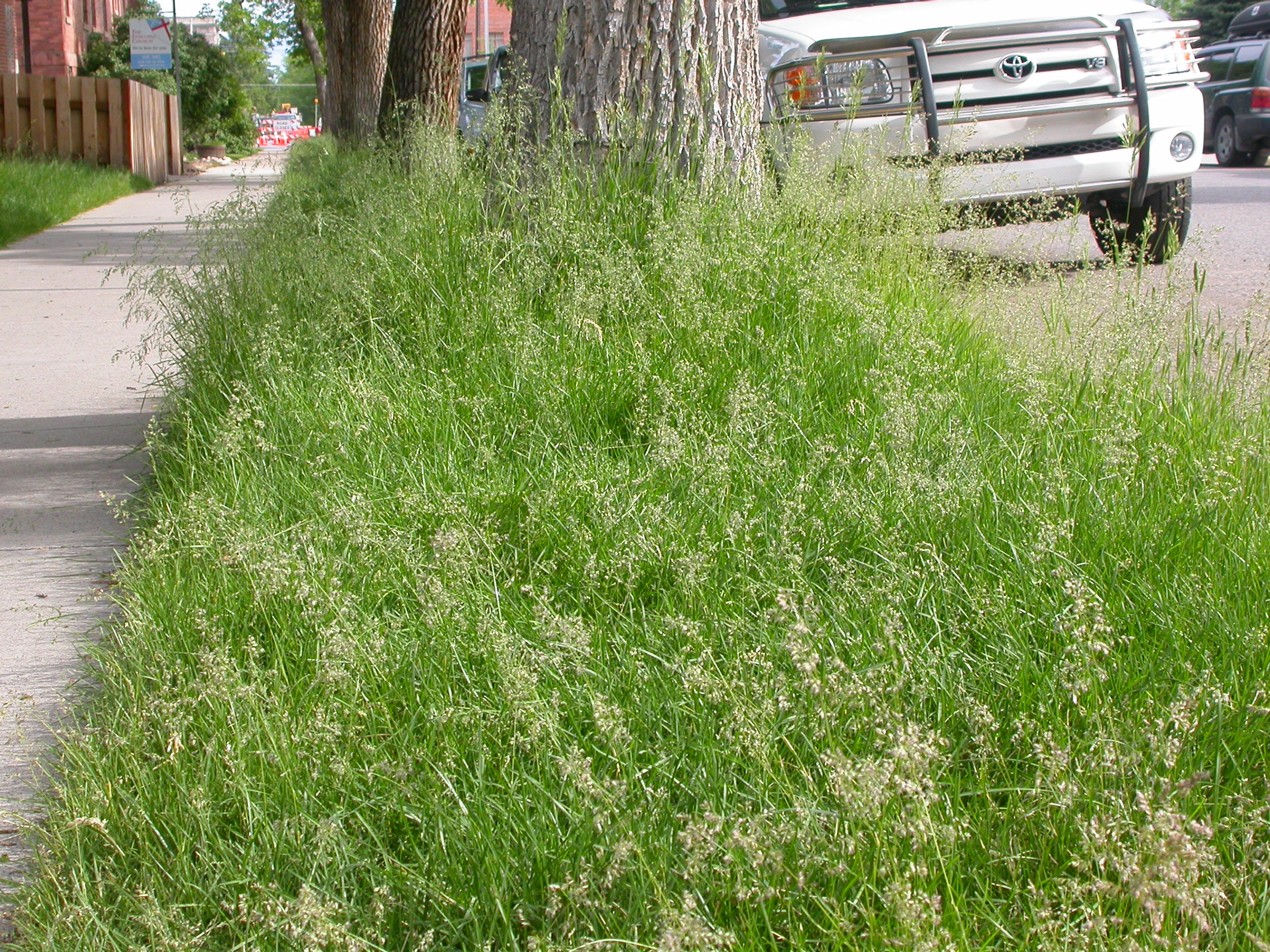

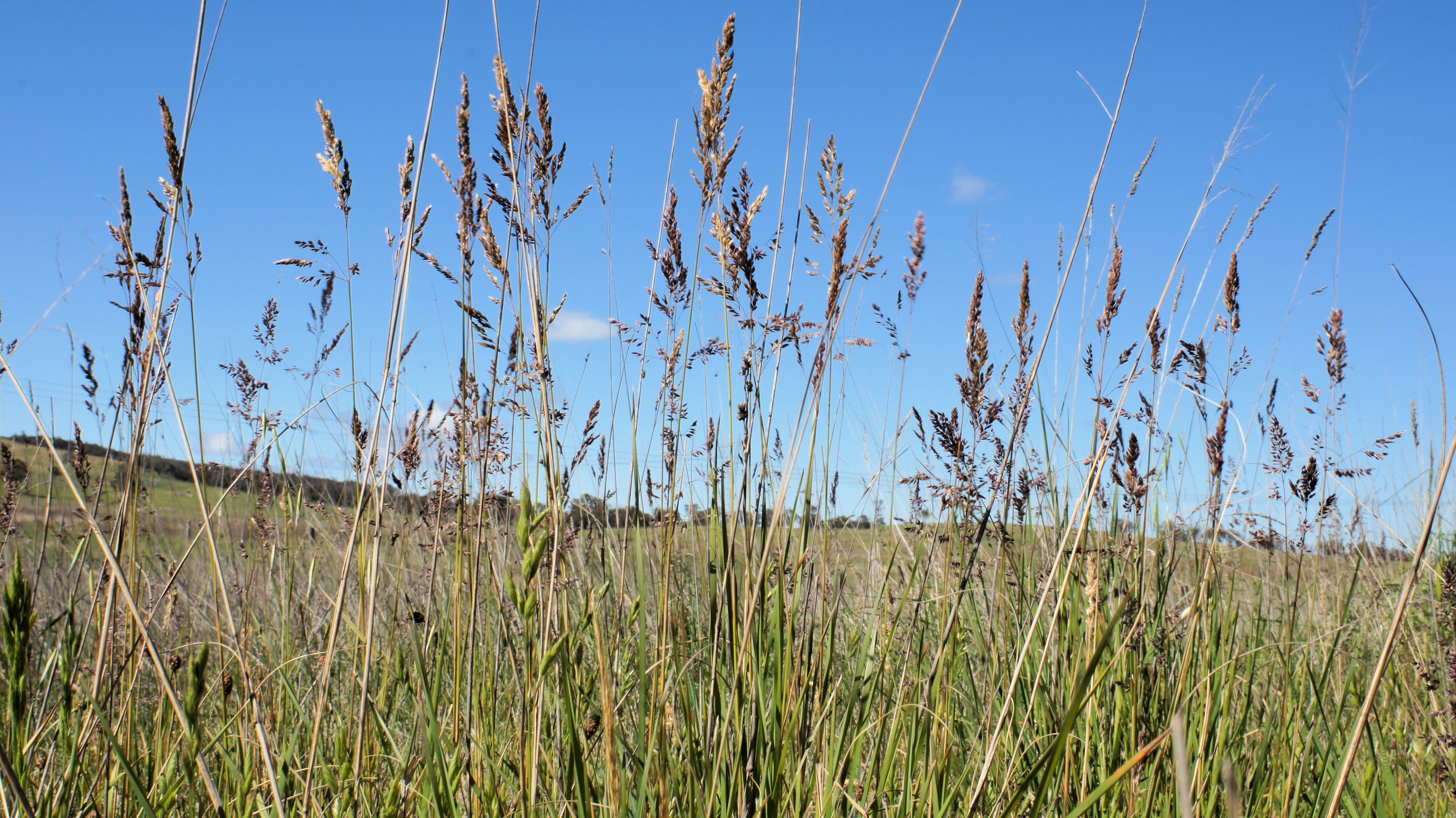

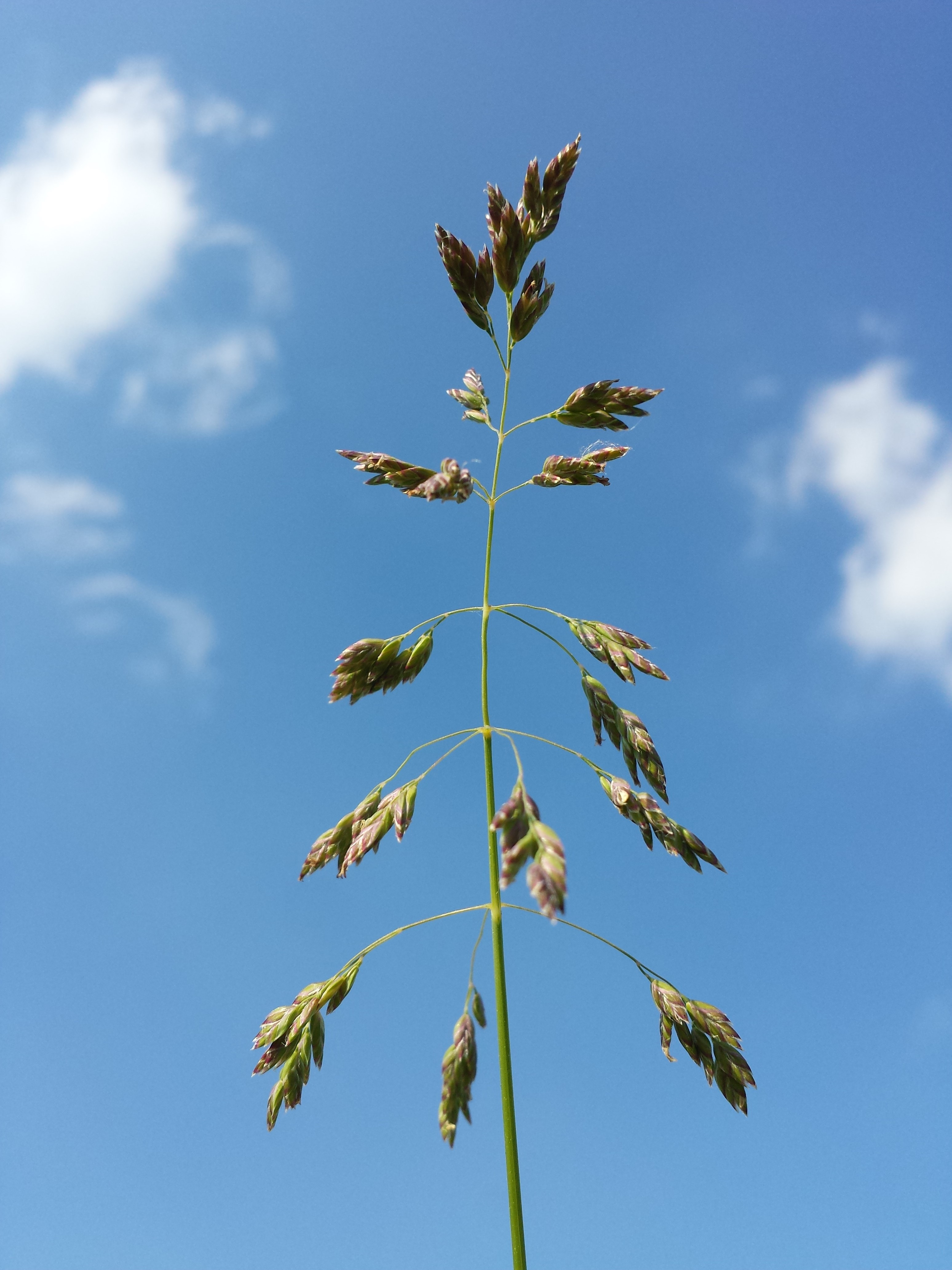

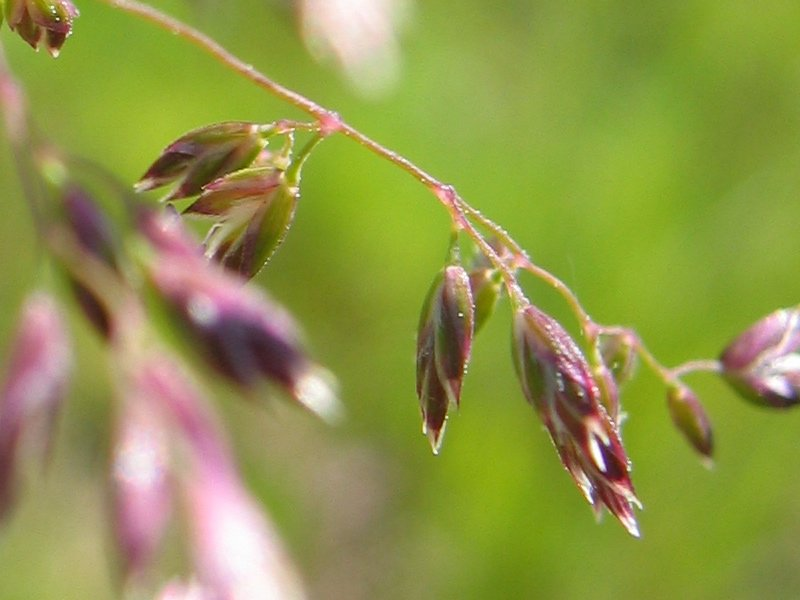
Closeup of flowers

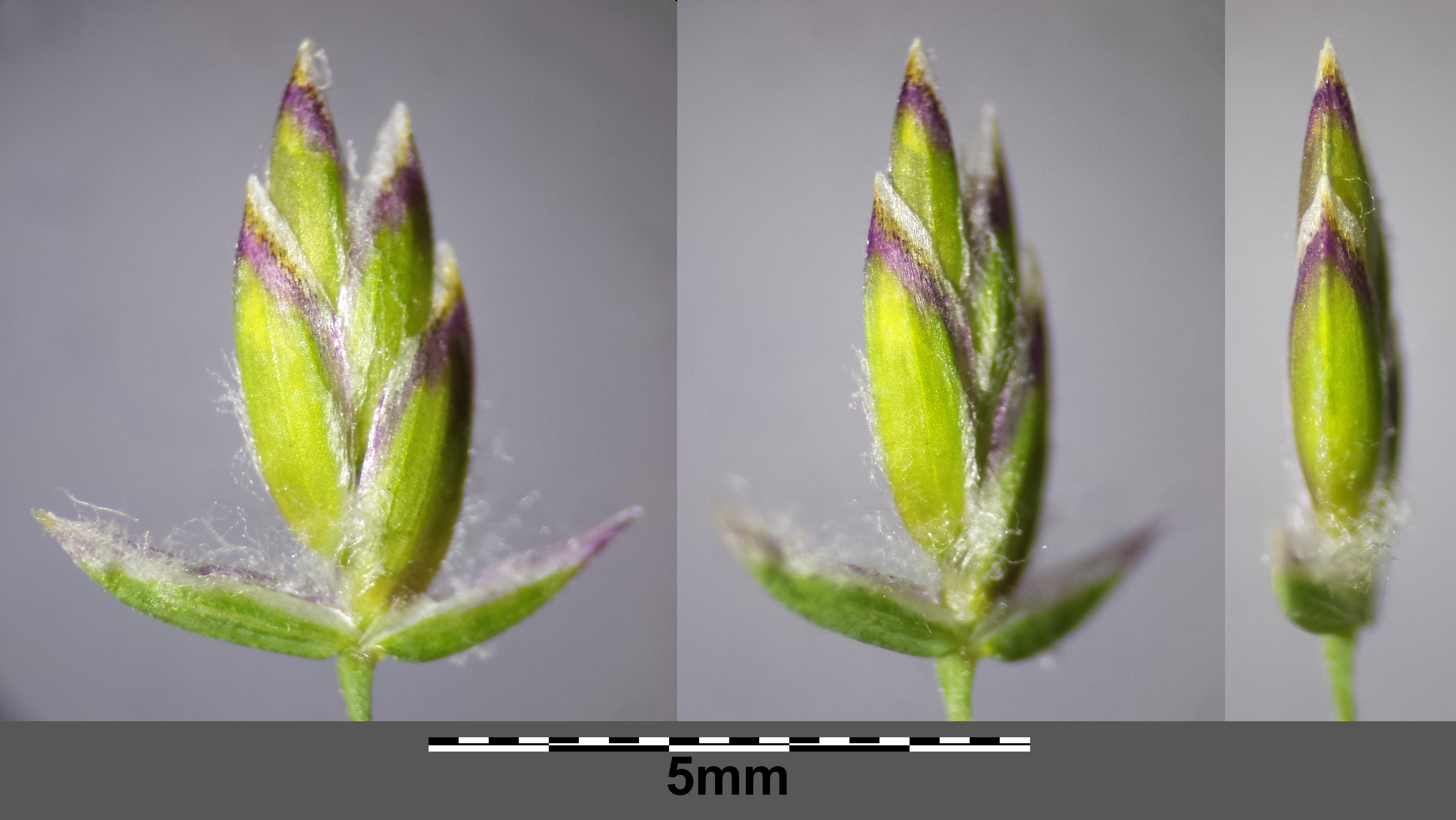

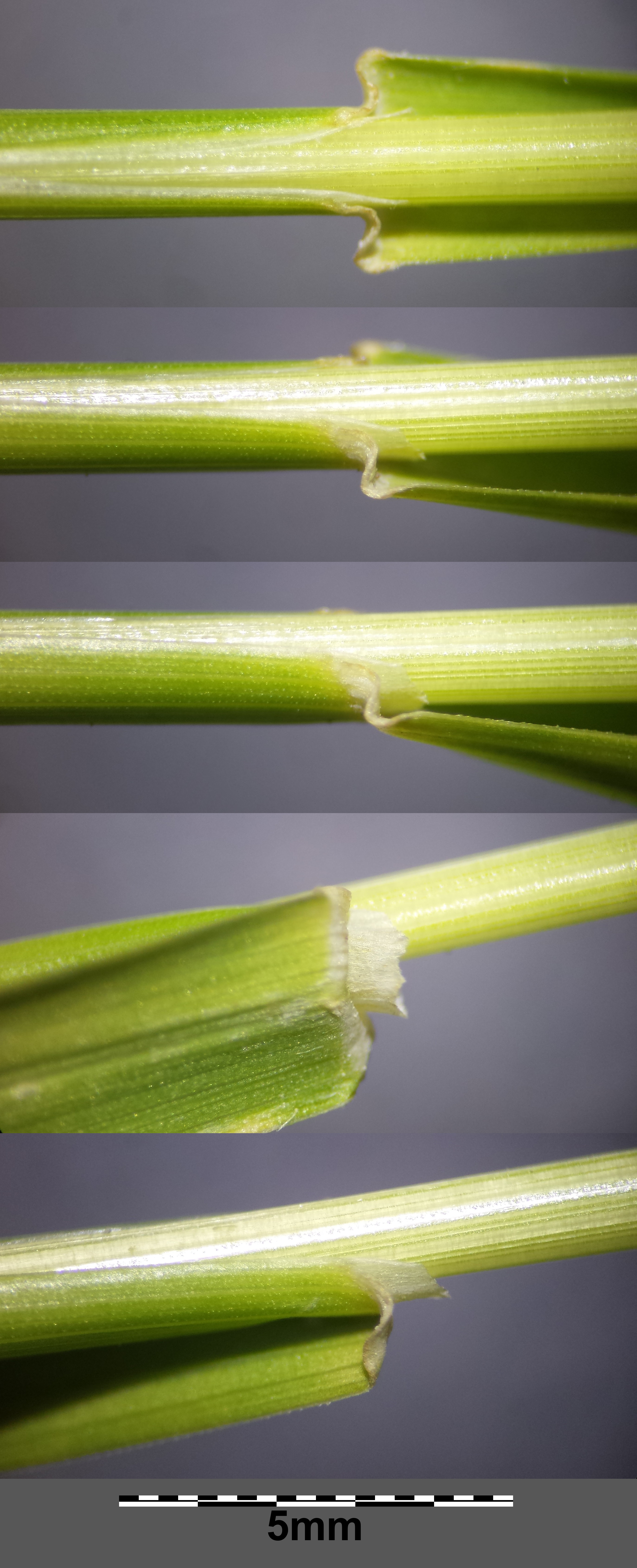

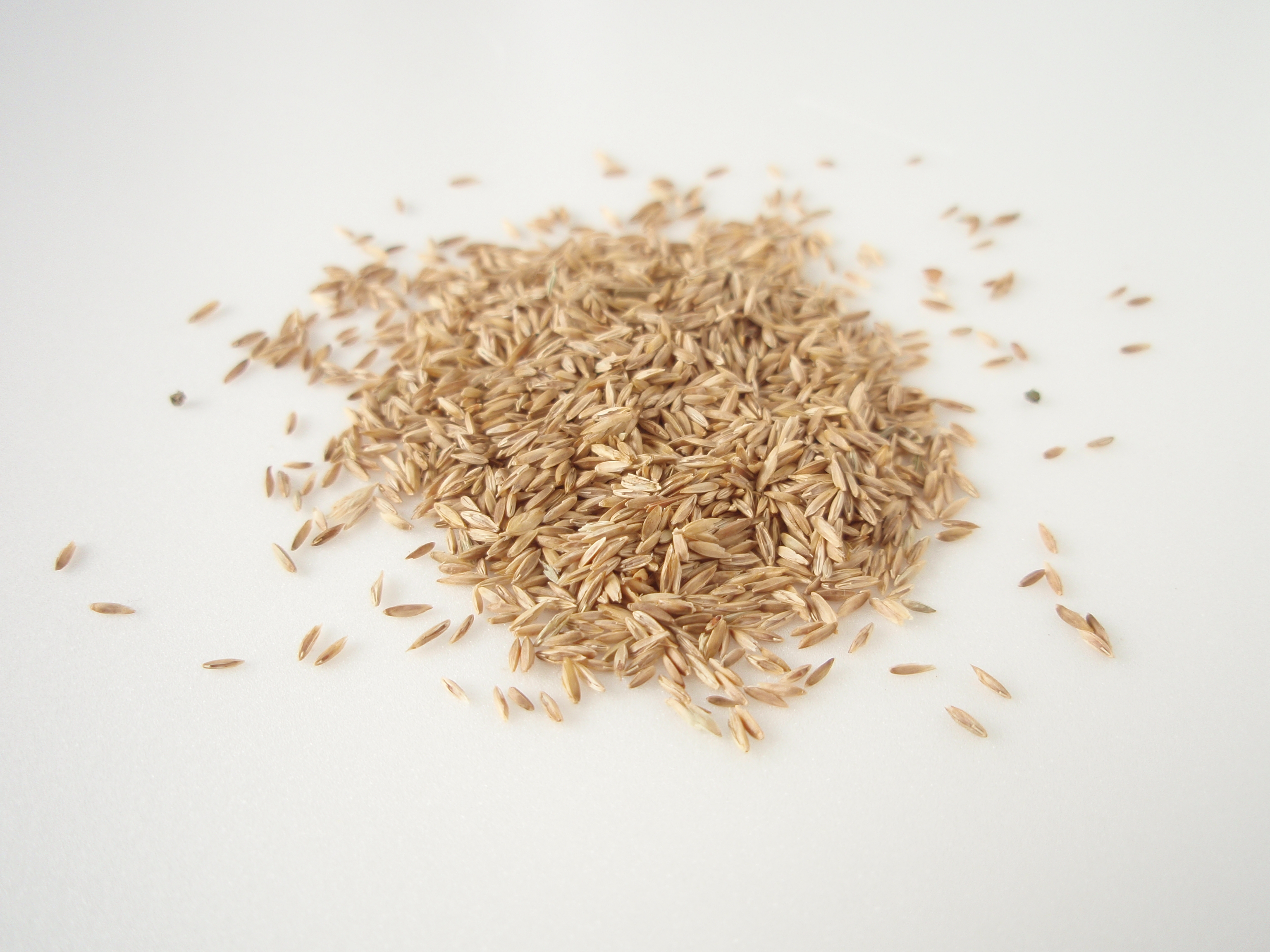
