= Poa arachnifera =

Texas bluegrass

Scientific classification
- Kingdom: Plantae
- Clade: Tracheophytes
- Clade: Angiosperms
- Clade: Monocots
- Clade: Commelinids
- Order: Poales
- Family: Poaceae
- Subfamily: Pooideae
- Genus: Poa
- Species: P. arachnifera

Binomial name
- Poa arachnifera L.

Species of grass

Poa arachnifera, the Texas bluegrass, is a species of grass. It is a dioecious perennial plant, native to the southern Great Plains of the United States.

== Hybridization with Kentucky bluegrass ==
During the 1990s, botanists began experimenting with producing hybrids of Texas bluegrass and Kentucky bluegrass (Poa pratensis) for use as wintering foraging plant for grazing livestock and as a drought-resistant lawn grass. The hybrids appear similar to Kentucky bluegrass, but maintain their green color in higher temperatures. Seed manufacturers began marketing the first of these hybrids, often termed "heat-tolerant bluegrasses", in the first decade of the 21st century.
