= Reformed Church, Nușfalău =

Church building in Nușfalău, Romania

Reformed Church in Nușfalău _{Református templom}
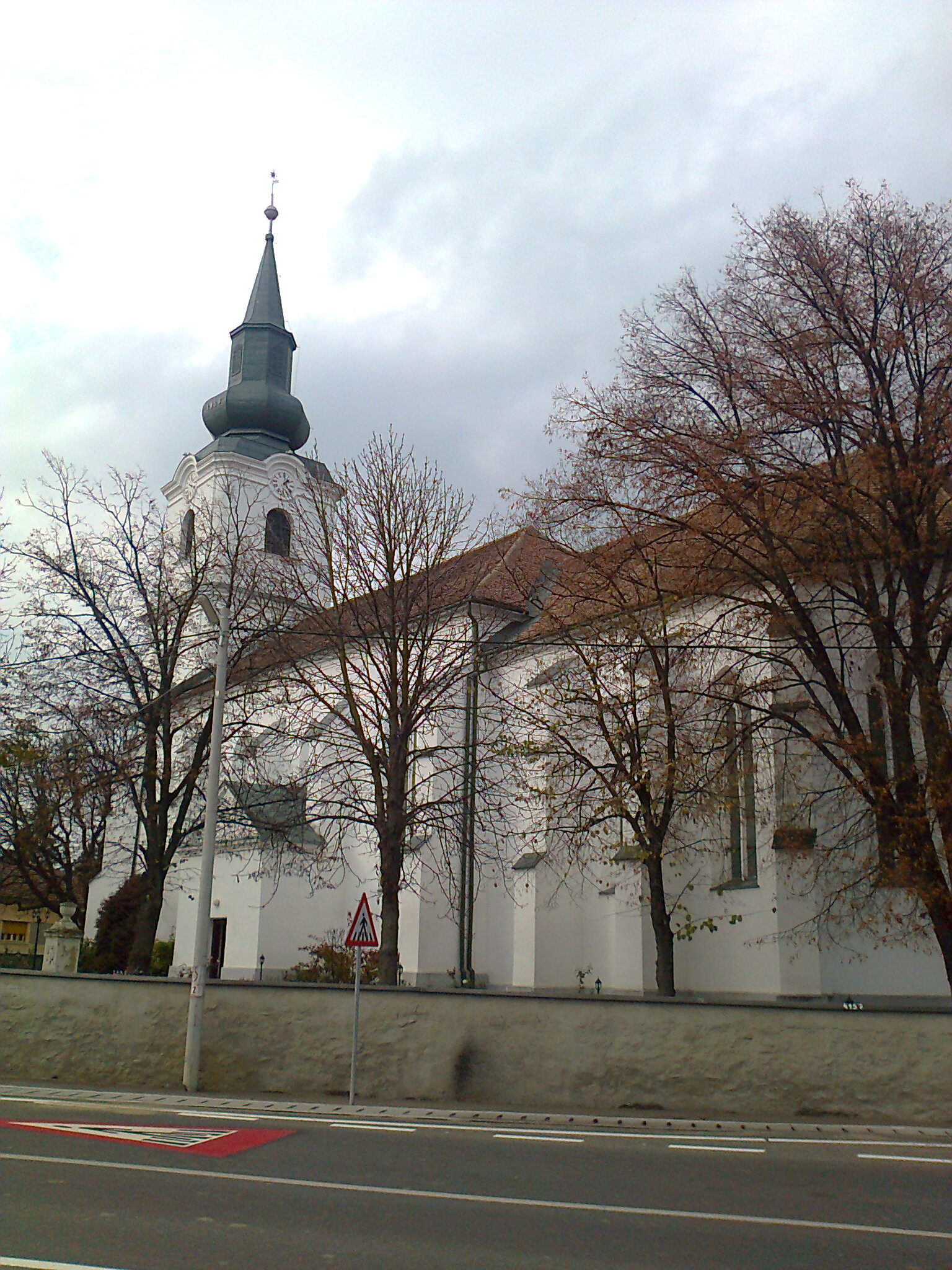

- Romania

Religion
- Affiliation: Reformed Church in Romania
- Region: Sălaj County
- Ecclesiastical or organizational status: parish church
- Year consecrated: 15th century

Location
- Location: Nuşfalău
- Municipality: Nuşfalău
- State: Romania
- Interactive map of Reformed Church in Nușfalău _{Református templom}
- Coordinates: 47.20768°N 22.91447°E

The Reformed Church (Romanian: Biserica Reformată; Hungarian: Református templom) is a church in Nuşfalău, Romania, built in the 15th century.

It is listed as a historic monument.
