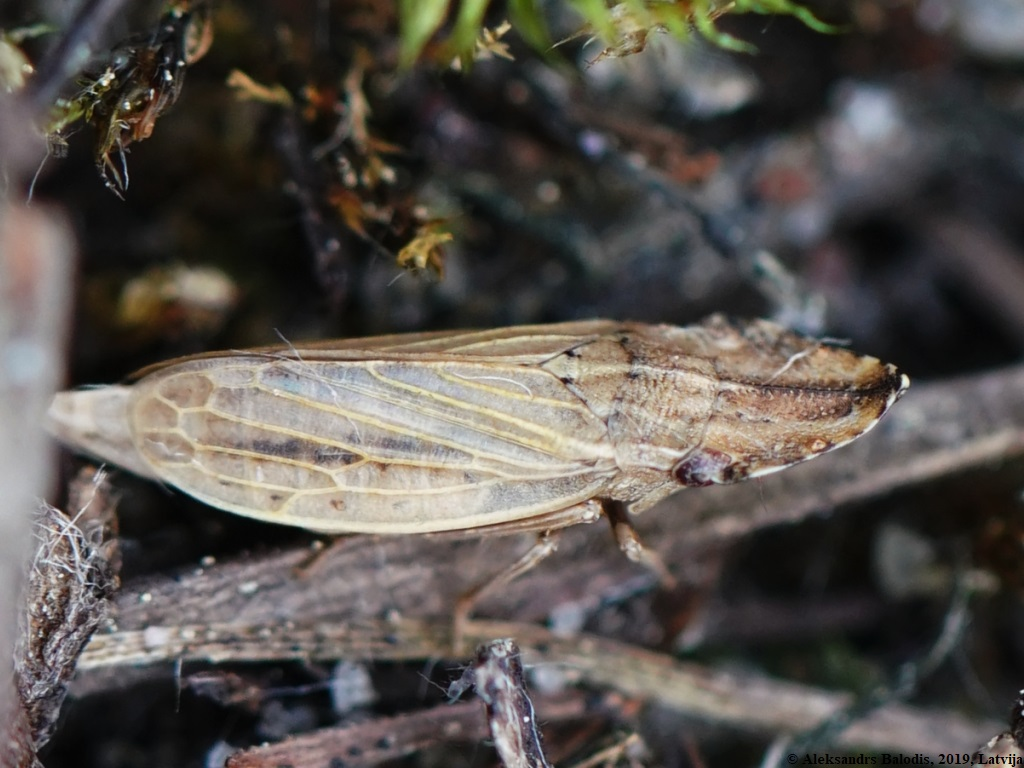

Scientific classification
- Domain: Eukaryota
- Kingdom: Animalia
- Phylum: Arthropoda
- Class: Insecta
- Order: Hemiptera
- Suborder: Auchenorrhyncha
- Family: Cicadellidae
- Genus: Eupelix
- Species: E. cuspidata

Binomial name
- Eupelix cuspidata Fabricius, 1775

= Eupelix cuspidata =

Species of true bug

Eupelix cuspidata is a species of true bug belonging to the family Cicadellidae.

It is native to Europe.
