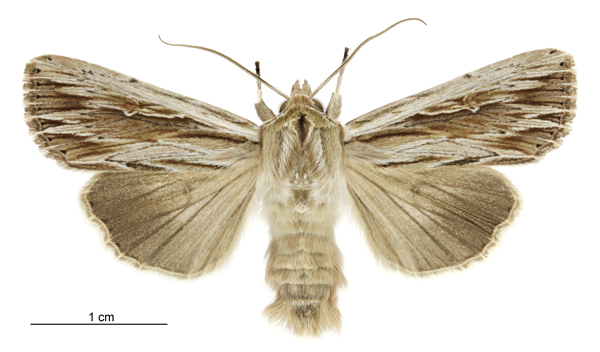
- Male
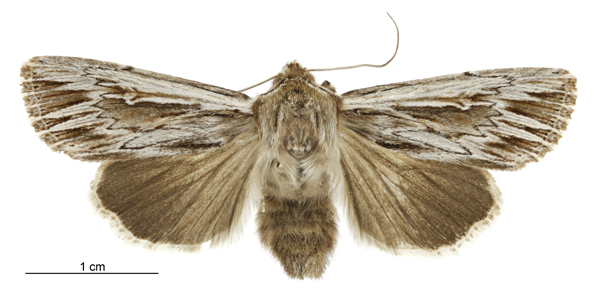
- Female

Scientific classification
- Kingdom: Animalia
- Phylum: Arthropoda
- Clade: Pancrustacea
- Class: Insecta
- Order: Lepidoptera
- Superfamily: Noctuoidea
- Family: Noctuidae
- Genus: Persectania
- Species: P. aversa

Binomial name
- Persectania aversa (Walker, 1856)

Synonyms
- Leucania aversa Walker, 1856; Morrisonia peracuta Morrison, 1874; Mamestra maori Felder & Rogenhofer, 1875; Leucania dentigera Butler, 1880

= Persectania aversa =

Species of moth endemic to New Zealand

Persectania aversa, commonly known as the southern armyworm, is a moth of the family Noctuidae. It was first described in 1856 by Francis Walker. It is endemic to New Zealand and can be found throughout the country including the North, South, Stewart and Chatham Islands. This species inhabits open grasslands. Larvae feed on grass species including commercial crops such as oats and barley and as a result this species is regarded as an agricultural pest. Adults are nocturnal and are attracted to light. They are on the wing throughout the year.

== Taxonomy ==
This species was first described by Francis Walker and named Leucania aversa. In 1898 George Hudson discussing and illustrated this species under the name Mamestra composita. In 1928 he again discussed and illustrated this species but this time under the name Persectania composita. This taxonomic confusion with the Australian species P. composita (now known as a synonym of P. ewingii) continued until 1954 when I. F. B. Common undertook a review of the genus Persectania. In that review Common studied both the male and female genitalia and confirmed that P. aversa was a distinct species and was confined to New Zealand. Common also stated that Mamestra maori, Morrisonia peracuta, and Leucania dentigera were probably synonyms of P. aversa. In 1988 J. S. Dugdale agreed with Common and listed these as synonyms of P. aversa. P. aversa is therefore the only New Zealand endemic species belonging to the genus Persectania. The female holotype specimen used by Walker for his description is labelled "country unknown" and is held at the Natural History Museum, London.

== Description ==
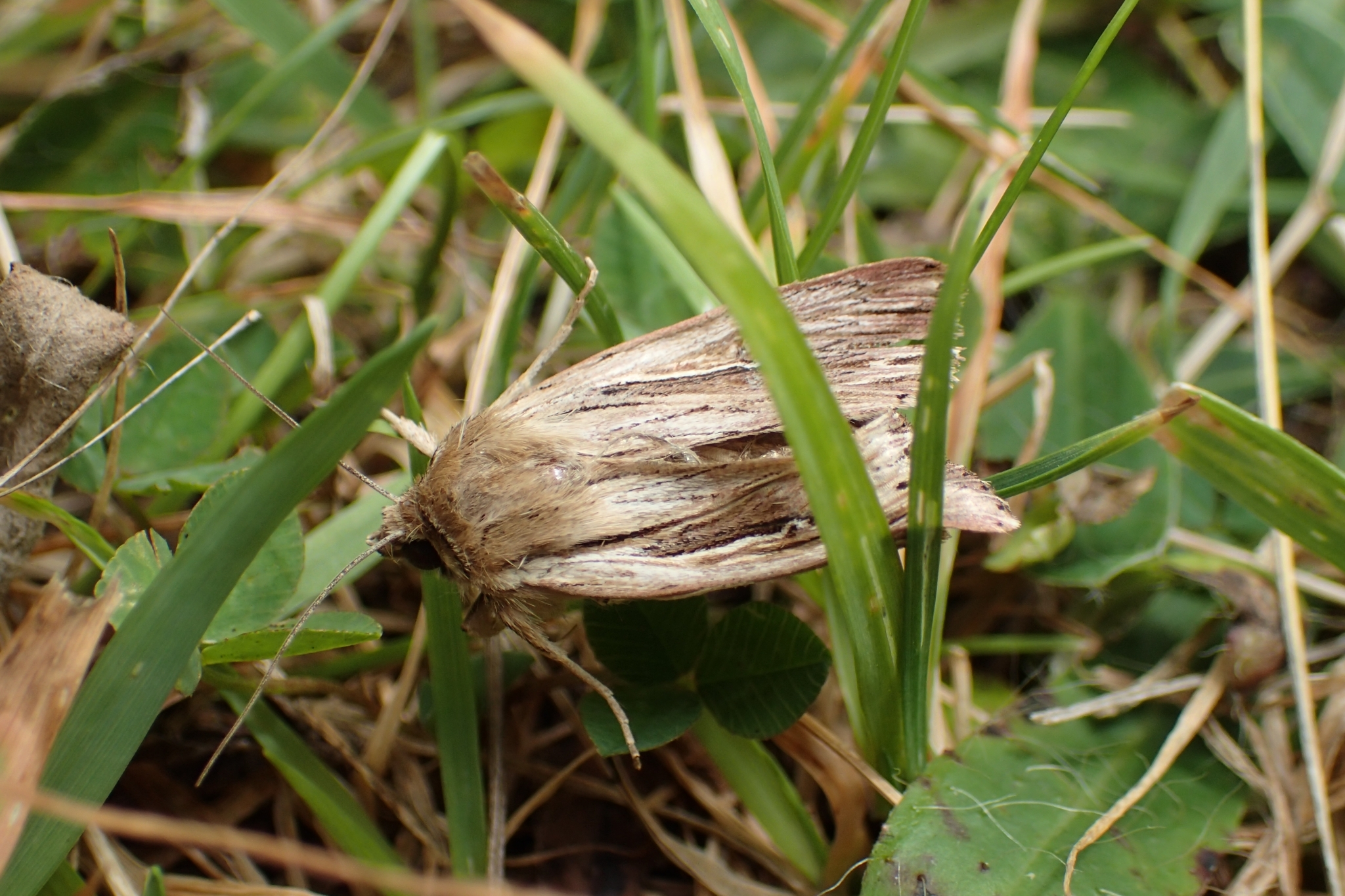
P. aversa in grass.

Walker described this species as follows:

Pale fawn-colour. Thorax with brown bands in front. Forewings with a white brown-bordered discal line, and with brown white-bordered exterior streaks. Hind wings pale, with broad brownish borders. Described from an injured specimen. Length of the body 6 lines; of the wings 14 lines.

The wingspan of the adults is 1 1/2 inches.

== Distribution ==
P. aversa is endemic to New Zealand and can be found throughout the country including on Stewart Island and in the Chatham Islands. It is regarded as being common to abundant but is less abundant in the north of the North Island.

== Habitat and hosts ==
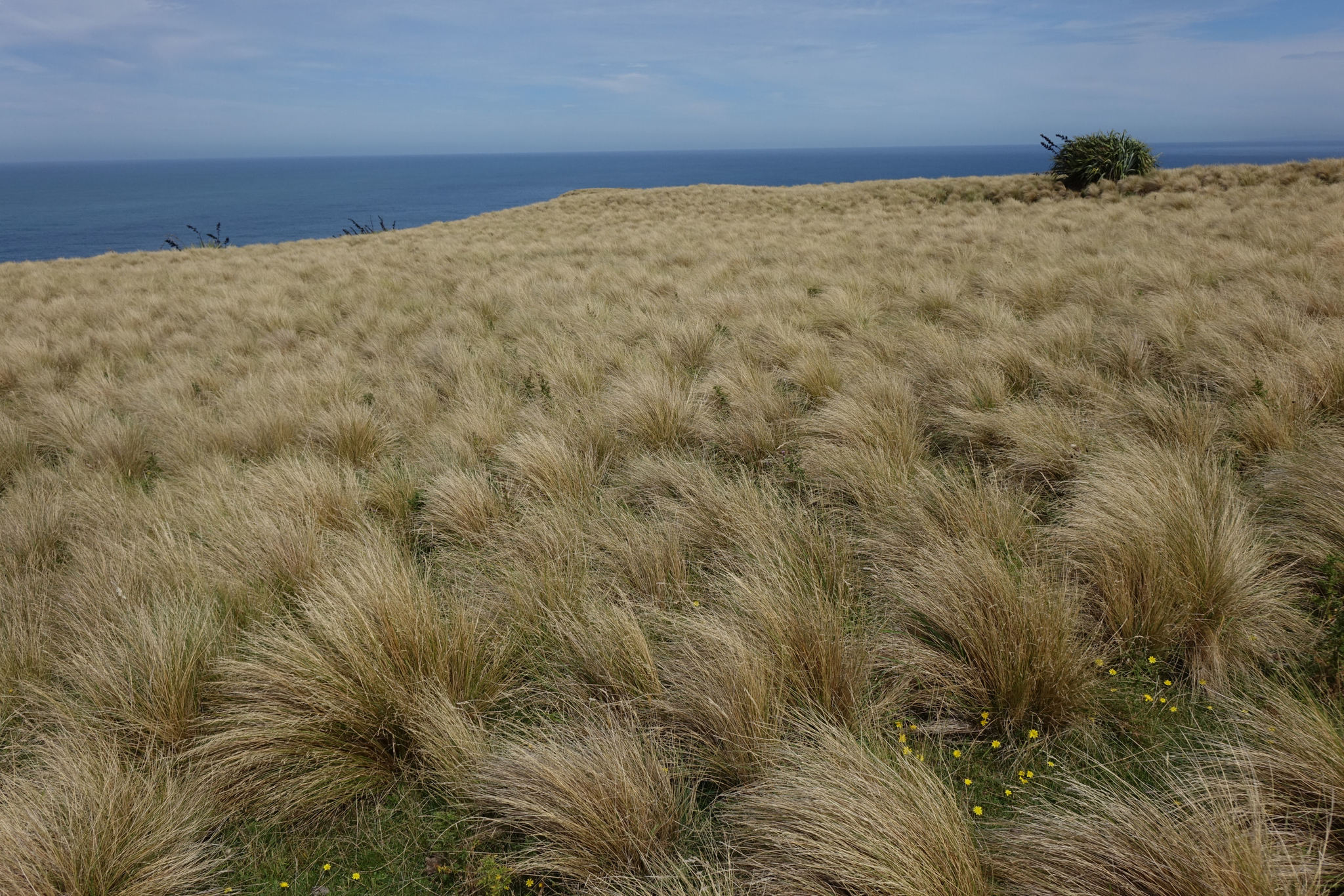
Larval host Poa cita.

This species inhabits open grasslands including pasture. Its recorded larval hosts include Ammophila arenaria, Avena sativa, Festuca novae-zelandiae, Hordeum vulgare, Nassella trichotoma, Phleum pratense, Poa annua, Poa cita, Poa colensoi and Triticum aestivum.

== Life history ==
The white or light brownish yellow coloured eggs are laid on the larval host plants and hatch after about seventeen days. The larva has a green underside and is brown with a red or pink tinge and has black, red and white lines on the back and sides of its body. It pupates on or just under the surface of the soil. This species usually overwinters in its pupa but it has been recorded as hibernating as an adult.

== Behaviour ==
Adults are on the wing throughout the year. They are nocturnal and is attracted to light. Adults have been collected via a mercury vapour light trap.

== Diseases ==
This species is known to have been affected by fungal disease as well as a virus that causes high mortality in the larvae of this species.

== Interactions with humans ==
This species is regarded as an agricultural pest. It has a reputation for being a pest of graminaceous crops. However the introduction of a parasitic wasp as a bio control has reduced its numbers significantly. This species was used as a test subject to develop an electrified fence to contain the larvae of Lepidoptera for research purposes.
