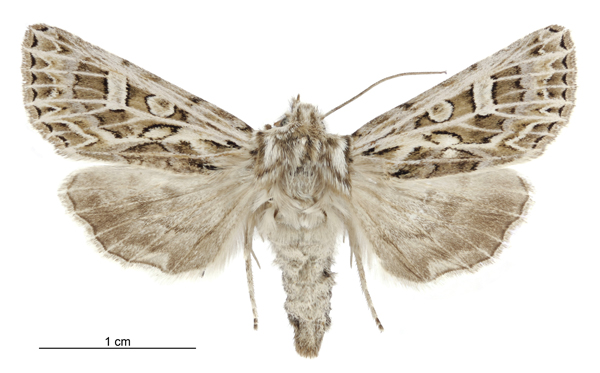
- Female
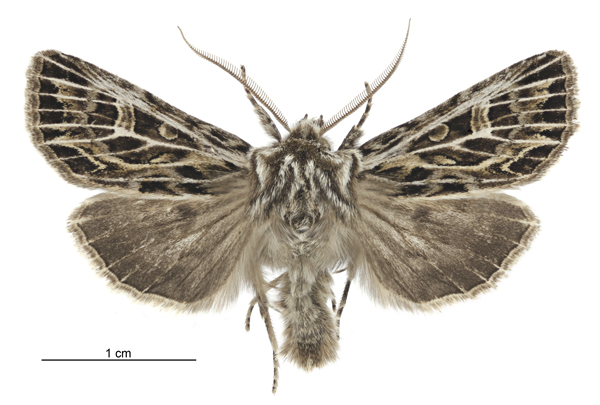
- Male

Scientific classification
- Kingdom: Animalia
- Phylum: Arthropoda
- Clade: Pancrustacea
- Class: Insecta
- Order: Lepidoptera
- Superfamily: Noctuoidea
- Family: Noctuidae
- Genus: Ichneutica
- Species: I. disjungens

Binomial name
- Ichneutica disjungens (Walker, 1858)

Synonyms
- Heliophobus disjungens Walker, 1858; Hadena nervata Guenée, 1868; Mamestra disjungens (Walker, 1858); Graphania disjungens (Walker, 1858); Melanchra disjungens (Walker, 1858); Persectania disjungens (Walker, 1858)

= Ichneutica disjungens =

Species of moth

Ichneutica disjungens is a moth of the family Noctuidae. This species is endemic to New Zealand and can be found on the central volcanic plateau of the North Island and in the eastern as well as the south western parts of the South Island. I. disjungens inhabits tussock grasslands in the alpine and subalpine zones. The hosts of the larvae of this species include Poa cita, P. colensoi, and Festuca novae-zelandiae. The adults of this species are distinctive and are unlikely to be confused with other species. They are on the wing between October and March.

== Taxonomy ==
This species was first described by Francis Walker in 1858 using a male specimen collected by Percy Earl, likely in Waikouaiti, and named Heliophobus disjungens. The holotype specimen is held at the Natural History Museum, London. In 1868, thinking he was describing a new species, Achille Guenée named this species Hadena nervata. In 1887 Edward Meyrick synonymised that name and placed the species within the Mamestra genus. J. S. Dugdale discussed this species in his 1988 catalogue and placed it within the Graphania genus. In 2019 Robert Hoare undertook a major review of New Zealand Noctuidae. During this review the genus Ichneutica was greatly expanded and the genus Graphania was subsumed into that genus as a synonym. As a result of this review, this species is now known as Ichneutica disjungens.

== Description ==
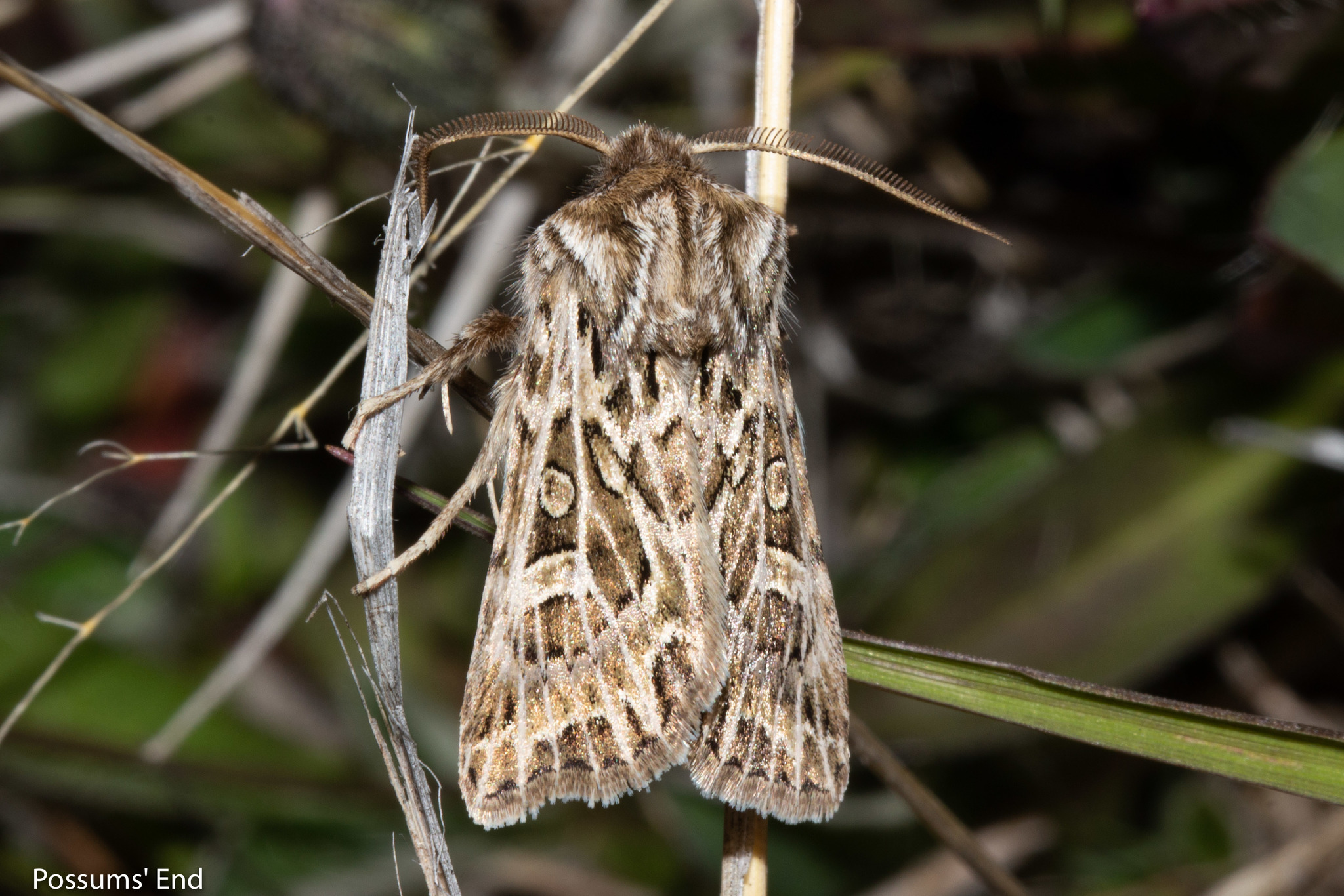
Observation of living male Ichneutica disjungens

Walker described the male of the species as follows:

Male. Cinereous, with a slight testaceous tinge, paler beneath. Fore wings with the discal part brownish fawn-colour; lines black, undulating, irregular; submarginal line whitish, diffuse; veins mostly whitish; orbicular and reniform marks with whitish and black borders; the former large, nearly round; the latter oblong-subquadrate; exterior border dark cinereous. Hind wings pale cinereous; band and exterior border darker, under side with a blackish interior streak, connected with the blackish lunule. Length of the body 6 lines; of the wings 14 lines.

I. disjungens is a distinctive and as such is unlikely to be confused with other species. The wingspan of the male of the species is between 34 and 38 mm, and for the female is between 35 and 39 mm.

== Distribution ==
This species is endemic to New Zealand. In the North Island, this species has only been found in the central volcanic plateau including the Tongariro National Park. In the South Island it is widespread. It is found in the eastern parts of the South Island as well as south western parts of that island including Fiordland.

== Habitat ==
This species inhabits tussock grasslands found in the alpine and subalpine zones.

== Behaviour ==
Adults are on the wing between October and March. I. disjungens is regarded as a faster flying species and stays active despite increased wind velocities. The adults of this species are attracted to light and have been collected via a mercury vapour light trap.

== Life history and host species ==
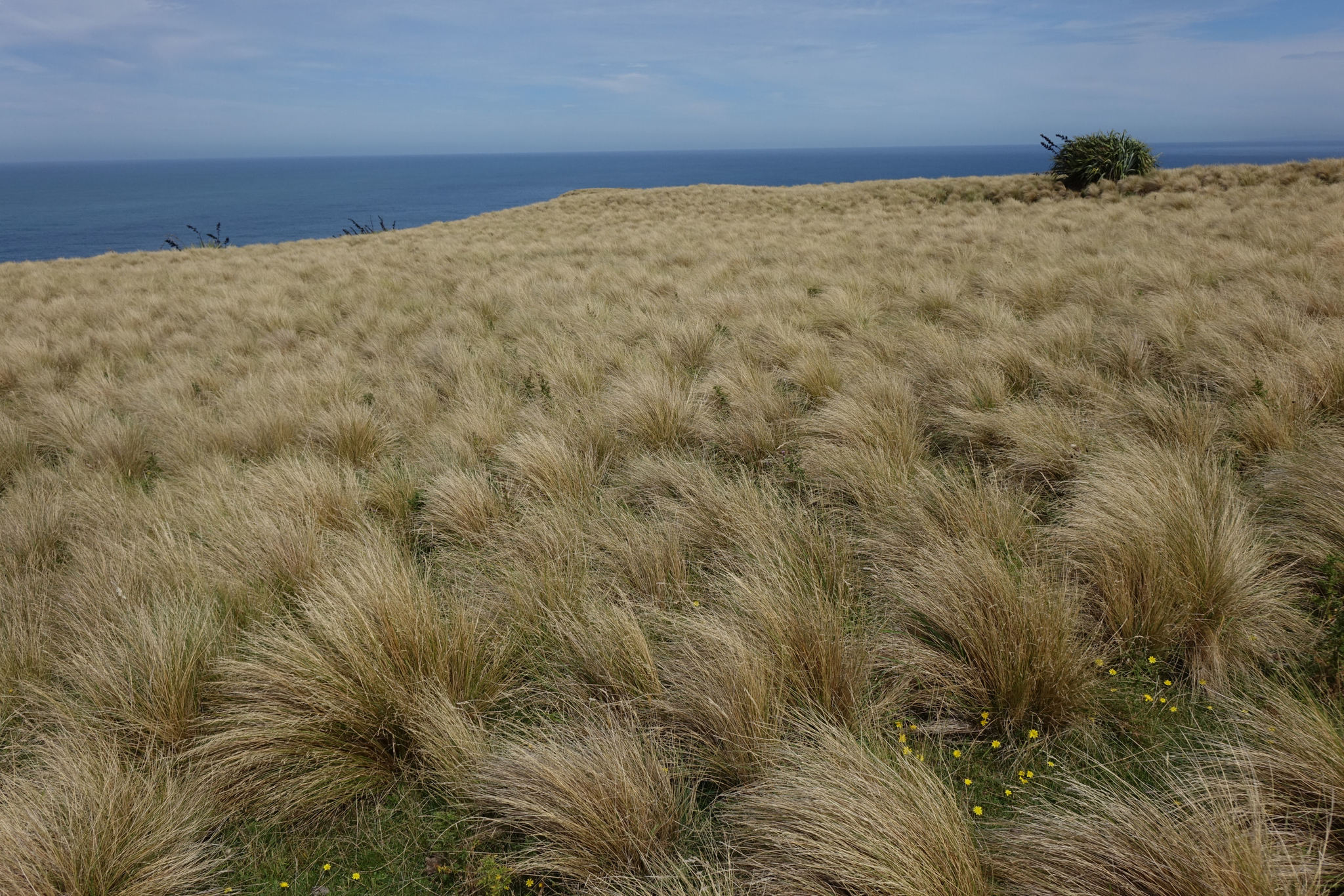
Larval host Poa cita

Very little is known of the life history of this species. The host species of the larvae is recorded as being tussock grasses, meaning Poa cita, Poa colensoi and Festuca novae-zelandiae. Adult moths have been observed feeding on the flowers of as well as pollinating Dracophyllum acerosum.
