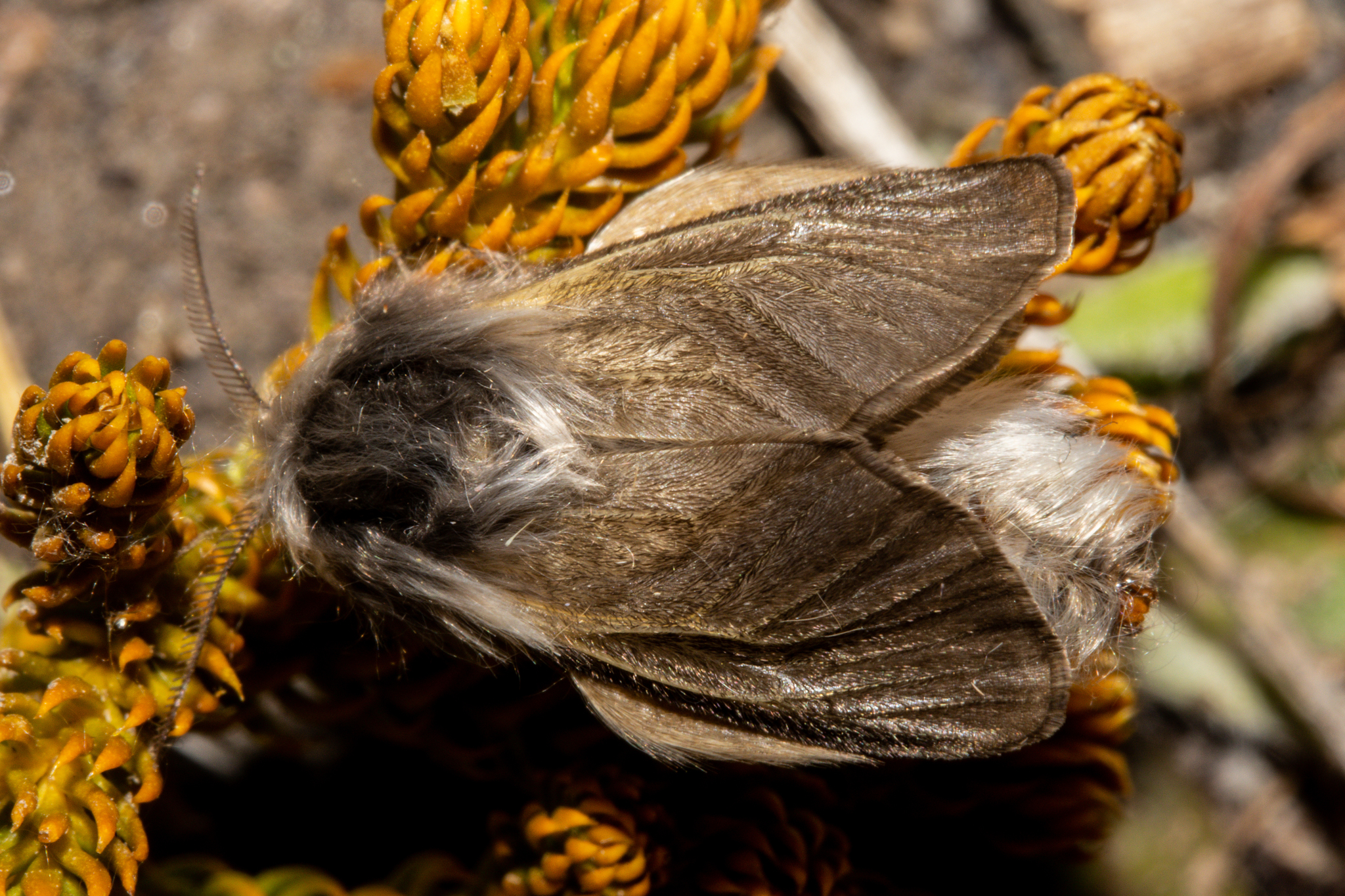
- Male moth
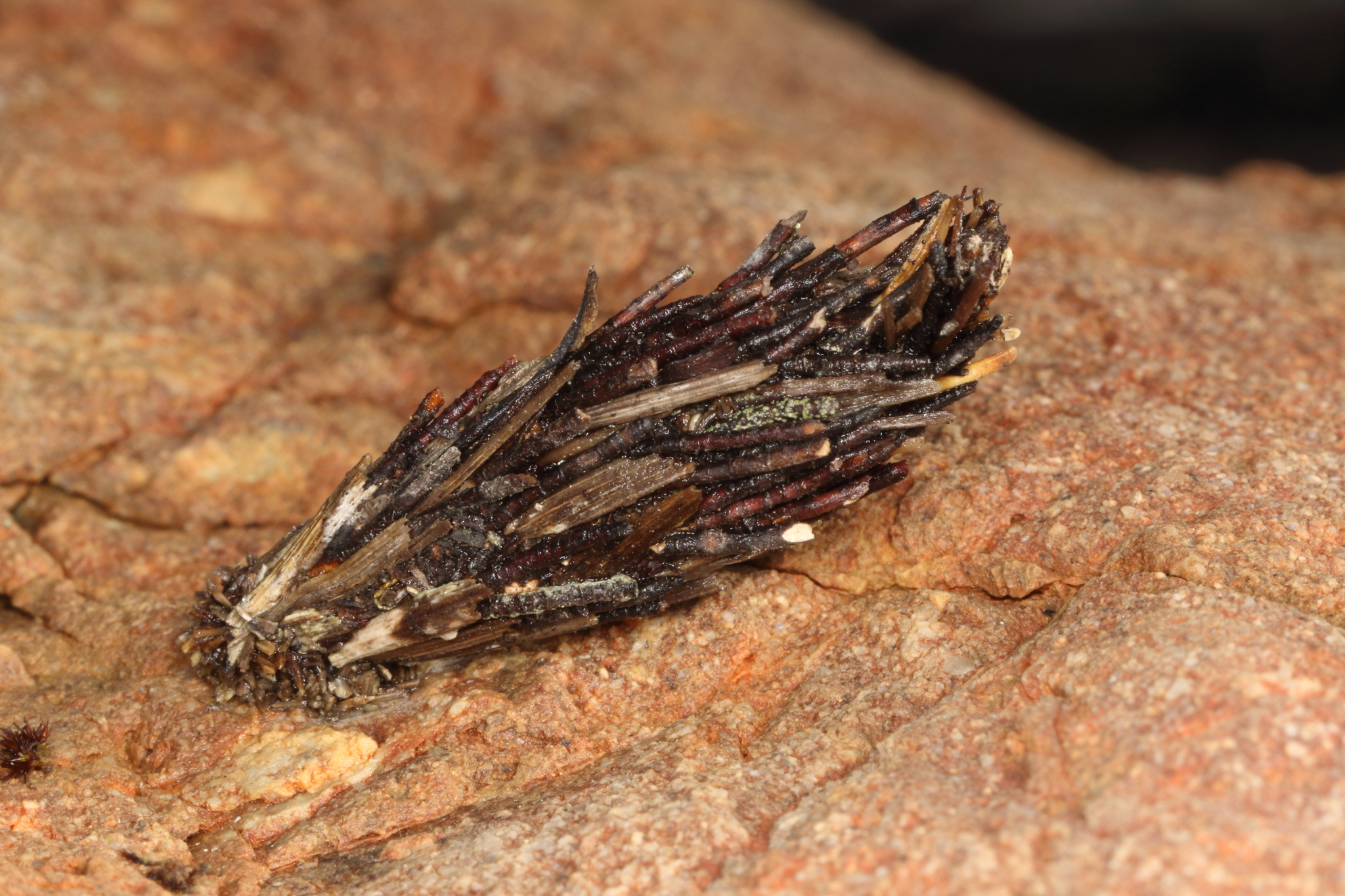
- Pupal case of Orophora unicolor

Scientific classification
- Kingdom: Animalia
- Phylum: Arthropoda
- Clade: Pancrustacea
- Class: Insecta
- Order: Lepidoptera
- Family: Psychidae
- Genus: Orophora
- Species: O. unicolor

Binomial name
- Orophora unicolor (Butler, 1877)

Synonyms
- Psyche unicolor Butler, 1877; Orophora toumatou Fereday, 1878

= Orophora unicolor =

Species of moth endemic to New Zealand

Orophora unicolor, also known as the alpine casemoth, is a bagmoth of the family Psychidae. It is endemic to New Zealand. This species was first described by Arthur Gardiner Butler in 1877. It can be found in the South Island and the larvae feed on tussock grasses as well as species in the plant genus Ozothamnus. The larvae start making their casing as soon as they emerge from the egg with the insect pupating inside that casing when mature. The adult female remains inside the case while the adult males emerge as grown moths. The males are on the wing from September until December and are attracted to light.

== Taxonomy ==
Orophora unicolor was first described by Arthur Gardiner Butler in 1877 and originally named Psyche unicolor. In the same year Richard William Fereday, thinking he was describing a new species, named this moth Orophora toumatou. In 1890 Edward Meyrick placed this species in the genus Orophora and synonymised the name Orophora toumatou George Hudson discussed and illustrated this species in his 1928 publication The butterflies and moths of New Zealand. The male holotype specimen, likely collected at Castle Hill in Canterbury by J.D. Enys, is held at the Natural History Museum, London.

== Description ==
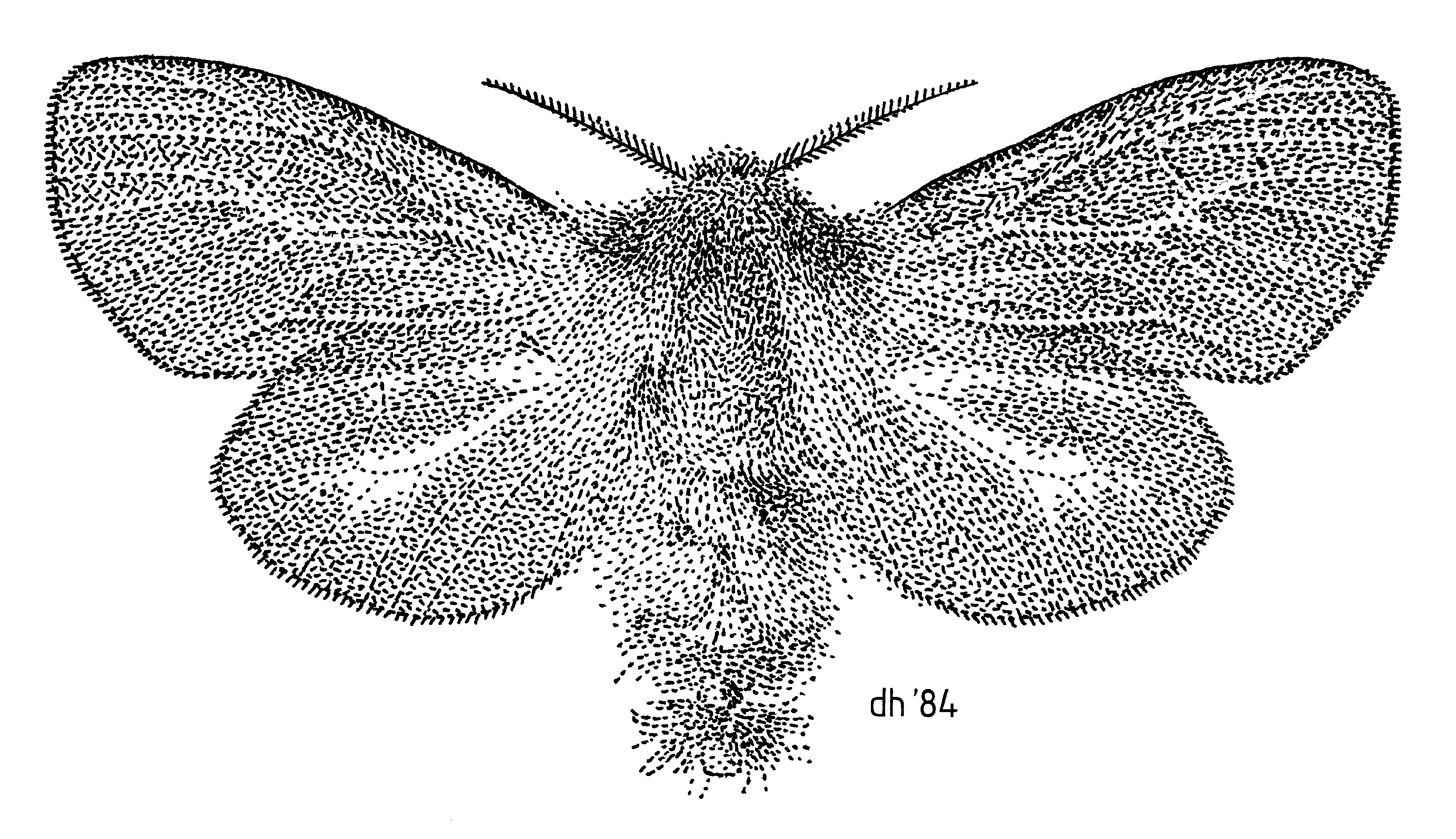
Male O. unicolor.

Butler described the casing of this moth as follows:

The case of P. unicolor is fusiform, truncated and open at the apex, through which (after the exclusion of the moth) the dark mahogany-brown pupa-skin projects; it is composed of short pieces of grass-stalks placed longitudinally, the largest being at the base, the smallest (mixed with small chips and silk) at the apex.

Butler described this adult moth of this species as follows:

Uniformly grey, the primaries of a slightly more brownish tint than the secondaries, and with a blackish costal edge; the secondaries subhyaline: body clothed with long woolly hair. Expanse of wings 1 inch.

Only the male metamorphoses into a recognisable moth. The adult female never leaves the bag and has no wings. Its case is covered with layers of short (up to 10 mm) lengths of tussock, laid longitudinally and overlapping, so that it looks like a bundle of twigs. The case averages 34 mm long and can reach 40 mm. The male is a hairy grey moth with translucent wings and a short abdomen and a 26.5 mm wingspan.

== Distribution ==
This species is endemic to New Zealand and is restricted to dry areas of the South Island.

== Habitat and hosts ==
Larvae of this species feed on tussock species such as Festuca novae-zelandiae, Poa cita and Poa colensoi as well as species in the plant genus Ozothamnus. Fereday collected O. unicolor on matagouri (Discaria toumatou) but noted that these were all pupal cases and that fragments of matagouri were not incorporated into the cases. Cases have also been collected attached to that plant species.

== Behaviour ==
The larvae of this species commences making its bag as soon as it comes out of its egg. Like other bagmoths the larvae of O. unicolor pupates inside its bag with females remaining inside the bag as adults and males emerging as grown moths. The male adults are on the wing from September until December and are attracted to light.
