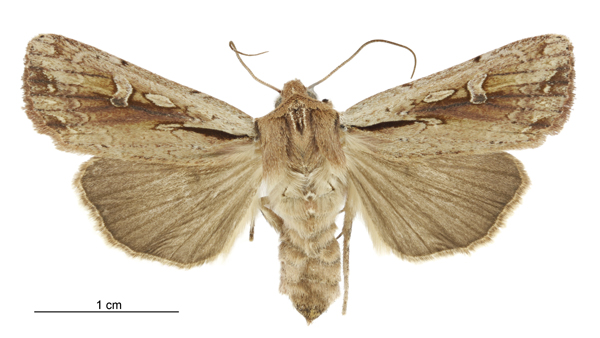
- Female
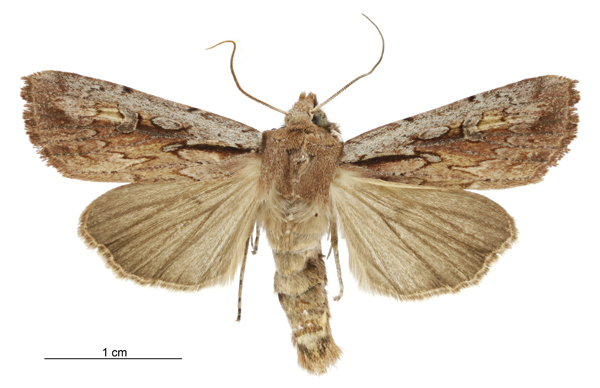
- Male

Scientific classification
- Kingdom: Animalia
- Phylum: Arthropoda
- Clade: Pancrustacea
- Class: Insecta
- Order: Lepidoptera
- Superfamily: Noctuoidea
- Family: Noctuidae
- Genus: Ichneutica
- Species: I. atristriga

Binomial name
- Ichneutica atristriga (Walker, 1865)

Synonyms
- Xylina atristriga Walker, 1865; Graphania atristriga (Walker, 1865); Persectania atristriga (Walker, 1865); Mamestra antipoda Felder & Rogenhofer, 1874; Leucania astristriga (Walker, 1865); Tmetolophota atristriga (Walker, 1865)

= Ichneutica atristriga =

Species of moth

Ichneutica atristriga is a moth of the family Noctuidae. It is endemic to New Zealand and is found throughout the North, South and Stewart Islands. The larval hosts likely include tussock grasses included Poa cita, P. colensoi and Festuca novae-zelandiae. Larvae have been reared on species in the genera Bromus and Festuca. The adults of this species are on the wing from November to May. I. atristriga can possibly be confused with the smaller species I. propria. However I. atristriga has thorax and forewings that have a pinkish tinge and I. propria has a dark streak on the discal part of the forewing which I. atristriga lacks. A study has indicated that the population numbers of this species have decreased.

== Taxonomy ==
This species was described by Francis Walker in 1865 from specimens collected in Nelson and named Xylina atristriga. The male lectotype specimen is held at the Natural History Museum, London. In 1988 J. S. Dugdale, in his catalogue of New Zealand Lepidoptera, placed this species within the Tmetolophota genus. In 2019 Robert Hoare undertook a major review of New Zealand Noctuidae. During this review the genus Ichneutica was greatly expanded and the genus Tmetolophota was subsumed into that genus as a synonym. As a result of this review, this species is now known as Ichneutica atristriga.

== Description ==
Hoare described the larvae of this species as follows:

a pallid larva with the head capsule pale brown, broadly darker in a central stripe and laterally, prothorax tinged yellowish brown, a distinct dark-edged greyish mid-dorsal stripe, becoming poorly defined on the thorax, a dark subdorsal stripe on each side, thicker towards the anterior end of each segment and edged whitish below (only the whitish edging distinct on the thorax), and a greyish lateral stripe, again more poorly defined on the thorax.

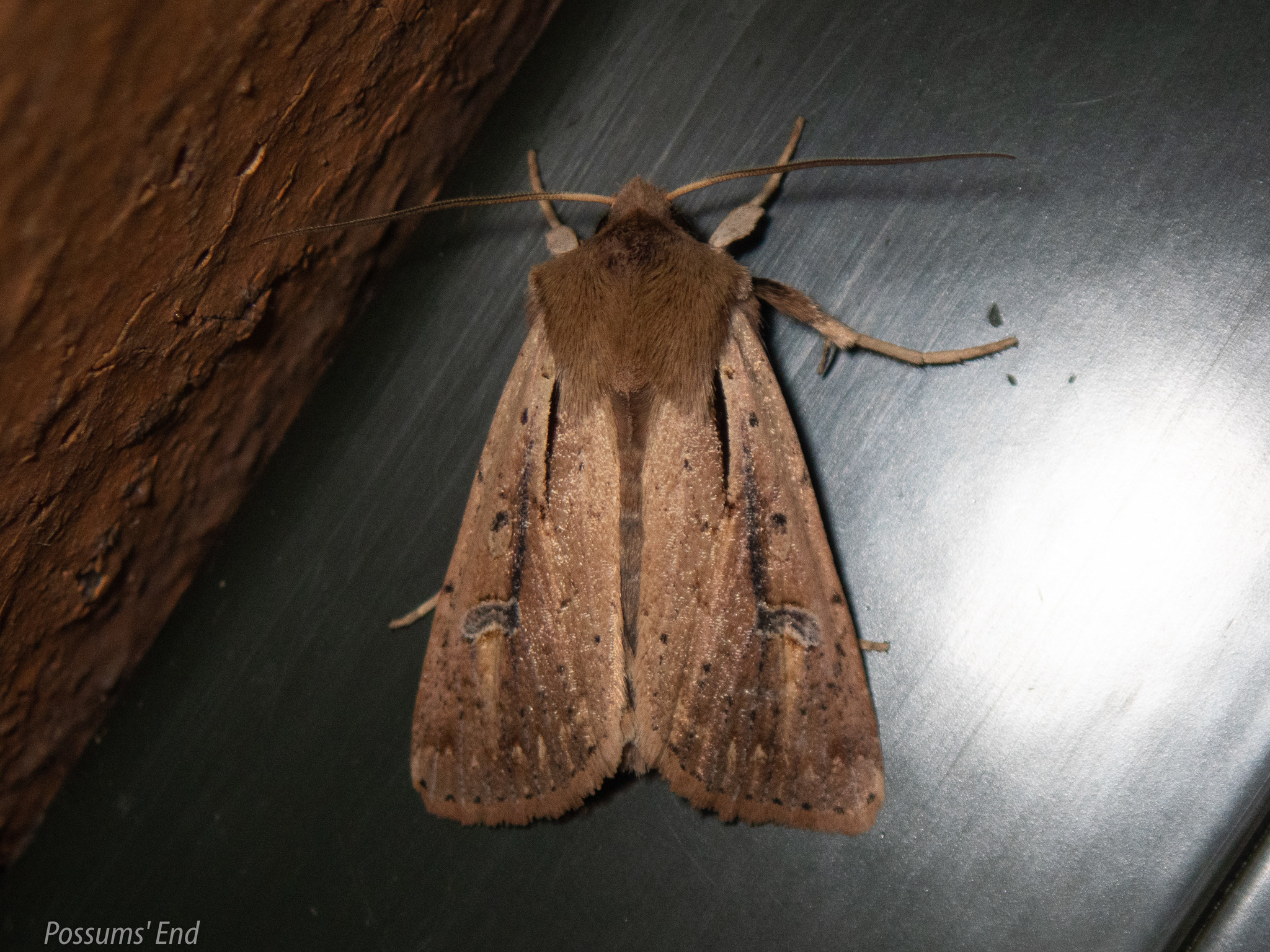
Observation of a live specimen of Ichneutica atristriga

Walker described the adults of this species as follows:

Male. Ferruginous-red. Palpi very slightly ascending, extending a little beyond the bead; second joint fringed beneath; third elongate-conical, full one-fourth of the length of the second. Antennae setose. Fore tegulae of the thorax with a slender dark cinereous-bordered band. Abdomen cinereous, with a tinge of fawn-colour, extending a little beyond the hind wings. Fore wings with a hoary irregular costal stripe, which extends from the base to five-sixths of the length, and partly contains the incompletely ferruginous-bordered orbicular and reniform marks; a black streak proceeding from the base and ending behind the inner end of the orbicular mark, which is not oblique; a row of blackish points on the veins at half the distance between the reniform mark and the exterior border, which is slightly oblique. Hind wings aeneous; fringe paler, edged with whitish. Length of the body 9 lines; of the wings 22 lines.

The adult male of this species has a wingspan of between 35 and 42 mm and the female has a wingspan of between 35 and 41 mm. I. atristriga can possibly be confused with the smaller species I. propria. However I. atristriga has thorax and forewings that have a pinkish tinge and I. propria has a dark streak on the discal part of the forewing which I. atristriga lacks.

== Distribution ==
It is endemic to New Zealand. I. atristriga is found throughout the North, South and Stewart Islands.

== Behaviour ==
The adults of this species are on the wing from November to May. They are attracted to light and have been collected via a mercury vapour light trap.

== Life history and host species ==
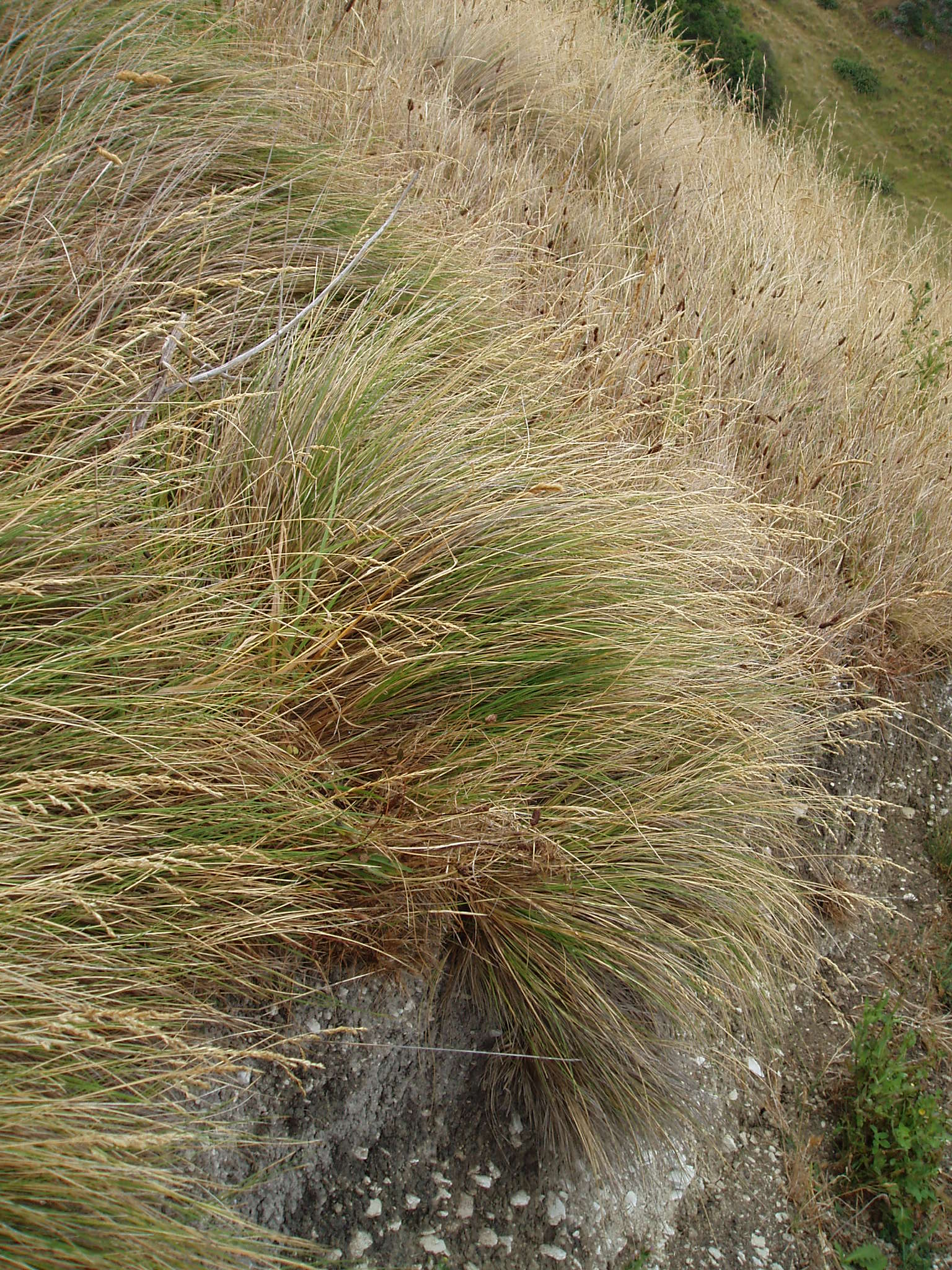
Poa cita, a larval host of I. atristriga

The life history of this species is in need of more detailed documentation. The larval hosts likely include tussock grasses included Poa cita, P. colensoi and Festuca novae-zelandiae. Larvae have been reared on species in the genera Bromus and Festuca.

== Conservation status ==
This species is regarded as being one of the most numerous noctuid species. However Graham White recorded a population decrease of over 40% at two locations during the period from the early 1960s until the late 1980s.
