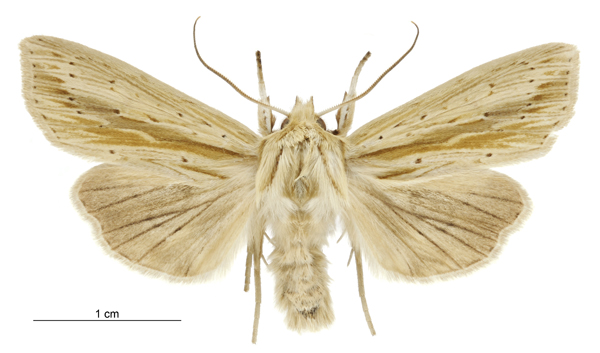
- Male
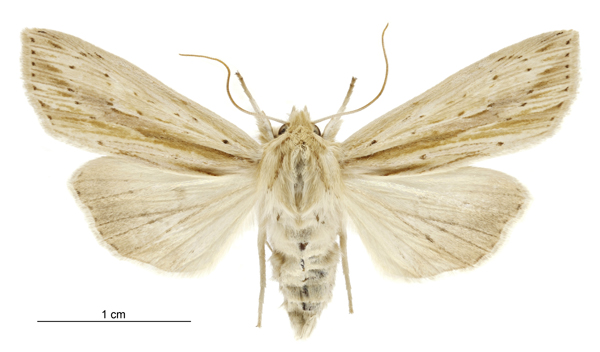
- Female

Scientific classification
- Kingdom: Animalia
- Phylum: Arthropoda
- Clade: Pancrustacea
- Class: Insecta
- Order: Lepidoptera
- Superfamily: Noctuoidea
- Family: Noctuidae
- Genus: Ichneutica
- Species: I. semivittata

Binomial name
- Ichneutica semivittata (Walker, 1865)

Synonyms
- Leucania semivittata Walker, 1865; Tmetolophota semivittata (Walker, 1865)

= Ichneutica semivittata =

Species of moth

Ichneutica semivittata is a moth of the family Noctuidae. It is endemic to New Zealand. It can be found from the Three King Islands down to Stewart Island. The similar species I. sulcana can be distinguished from I. semivittata as the former is much larger, has a darker hindwing and abdomen and has only one to three spots located behind the middle of the forewing in comparison to the 8 or 9 of I. semivittata. This species lives in a variety of habitats from open grasslands to clearings in forest and at a range of altitudes from the sea level to the alpine zone. Larval host species include Juncus procera, Carex secta as well as on tussock grasses such as Poa cita, P. colensoi and Festuca novae-zelandiae. Adults of this species are on the wing from August to April and are attracted to light.

== Taxonomy ==
This species was first described by Francis Walker in 1865 using a male specimen collected in Nelson by T. R. Oxley. Walker originally named the species Leucania semivittata. J. S. Dugdale discussed this species in his 1988 catalogue and placed it within the Tmetolophota genus. In 2019 Robert Hoare undertook a major review of New Zealand Noctuidae. During this review the genus Ichneutica was greatly expanded and the genus Tmetolophota was subsumed into that genus as a synonym. As a result of this review, this species is now known as Ichneutica semivittata.

== Description ==
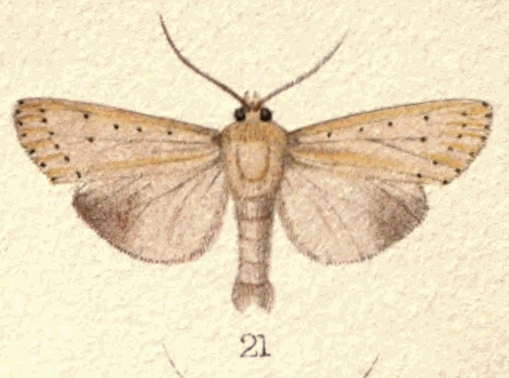
Ichneutica semivittata illustrated by George Hudson

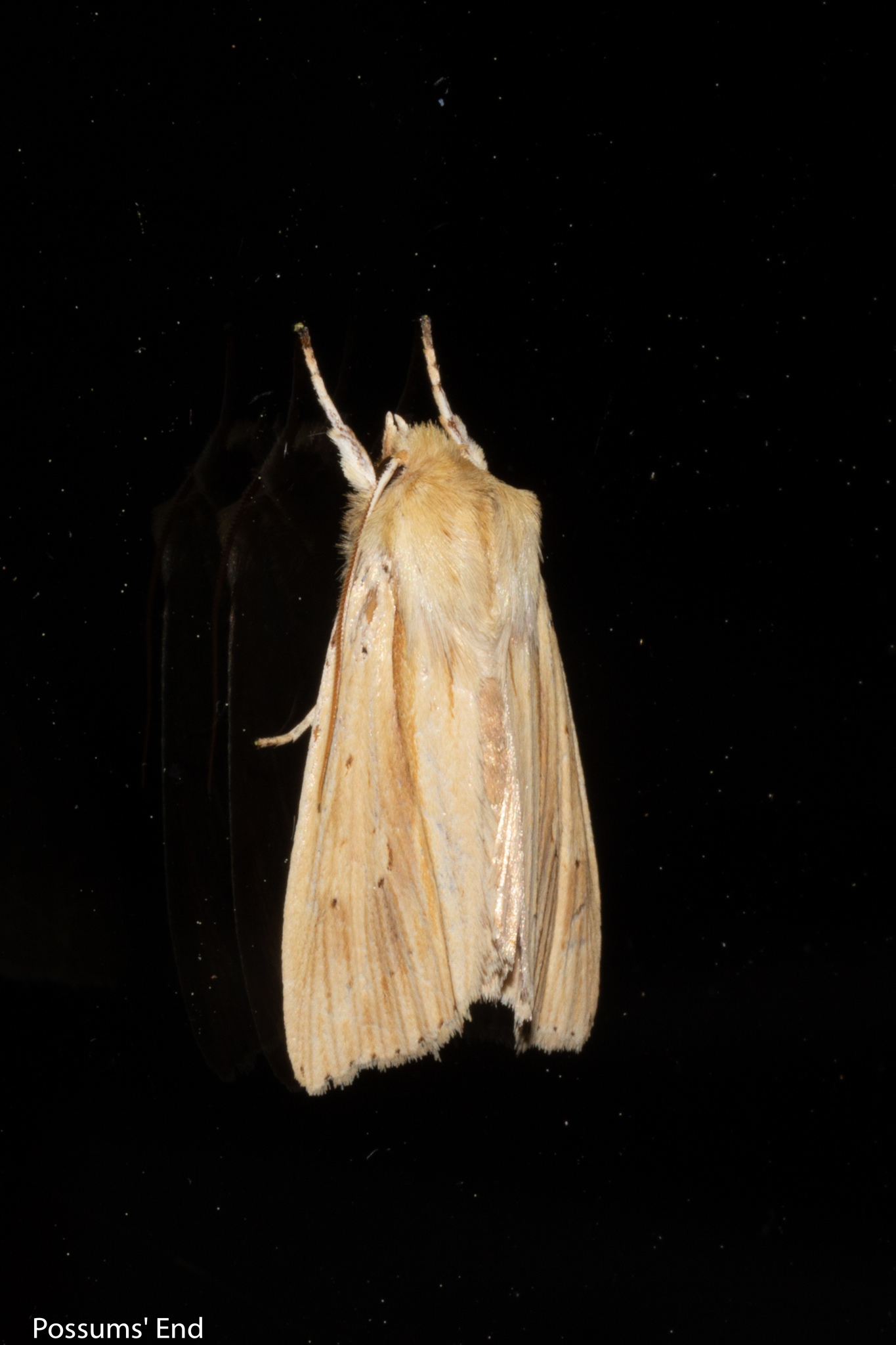
Living specimen of Ichneutica semivittata

George Hudson described the larvae of I. semivittata as follows:

The larva, which feeds on native grasses, is about 1 1/4 inches in length, subcylindrical, slightly tapering at each end; dull green, very finely streaked with reddish-brown; the dorsal and subdorsal lines are indicated by fine double reddish lines; there is a series of white dots, one on each segment, except on the second and last; the lateral line is very distinct, dark reddish-brown, shaded with cream colour below; the spiracles are blackish; the underside of the larva and the whole of the second segment is a paler and clearer green than the rest of the body.

Walker described the adults of this species as follows:

Male, Very pale fawn-colour. Palpi hardly ascending, as long as the breadth of the head; second joint fringed beneath; third lanceolate, less than half the length of the second. Antennae setose. Abdomen extending somewhat beyond the hind wings. Wings with black marginal points. Fore wings acute, with a short black basal line; the latter is accompanied by an ochraceous line which extends irregularly along the hind side of a brownish streak in the disk; this streak is traversed by a curved line of black points; veins towards the exterior border brownish, with brownish lines between them; under side with a brownish patch in the disk beyond the middle. Hind wings brownish above, except along the interior border. Length of the body 9 lines; of the wings 22 lines.

The wingspan of the adult male of this species is between 30 and 42 mm and for the female is between 31 and 40 mm. This species is distinctive and can be distinguished from other species as it has a reddish ochreous streak on the forewing. The similar species I. sulcana can be distinguished from I. semivittata as the former is much larger, has a darker hindwing and abdomen and has only on to three spots located behind the middle of the forewing in comparison to the 8 or 9 of I. semivittata.

== Distribution ==
It is endemic to New Zealand. The species can be found from Three Kings Islands down to and including Stewart Island.

== Habitat ==
This species lives in a variety of habitats from open grasslands to clearings in forest and at a range of altitudes from the sea level to the alpine zone. It is relatively rare in the tussock grasslands of the MacKenzie country and in Canterbury.

== Behaviour ==
Adults of this species are on the wing from August to April. They are attracted to light and have been collected via a mercury vapour light trap.

== Life history and host species ==
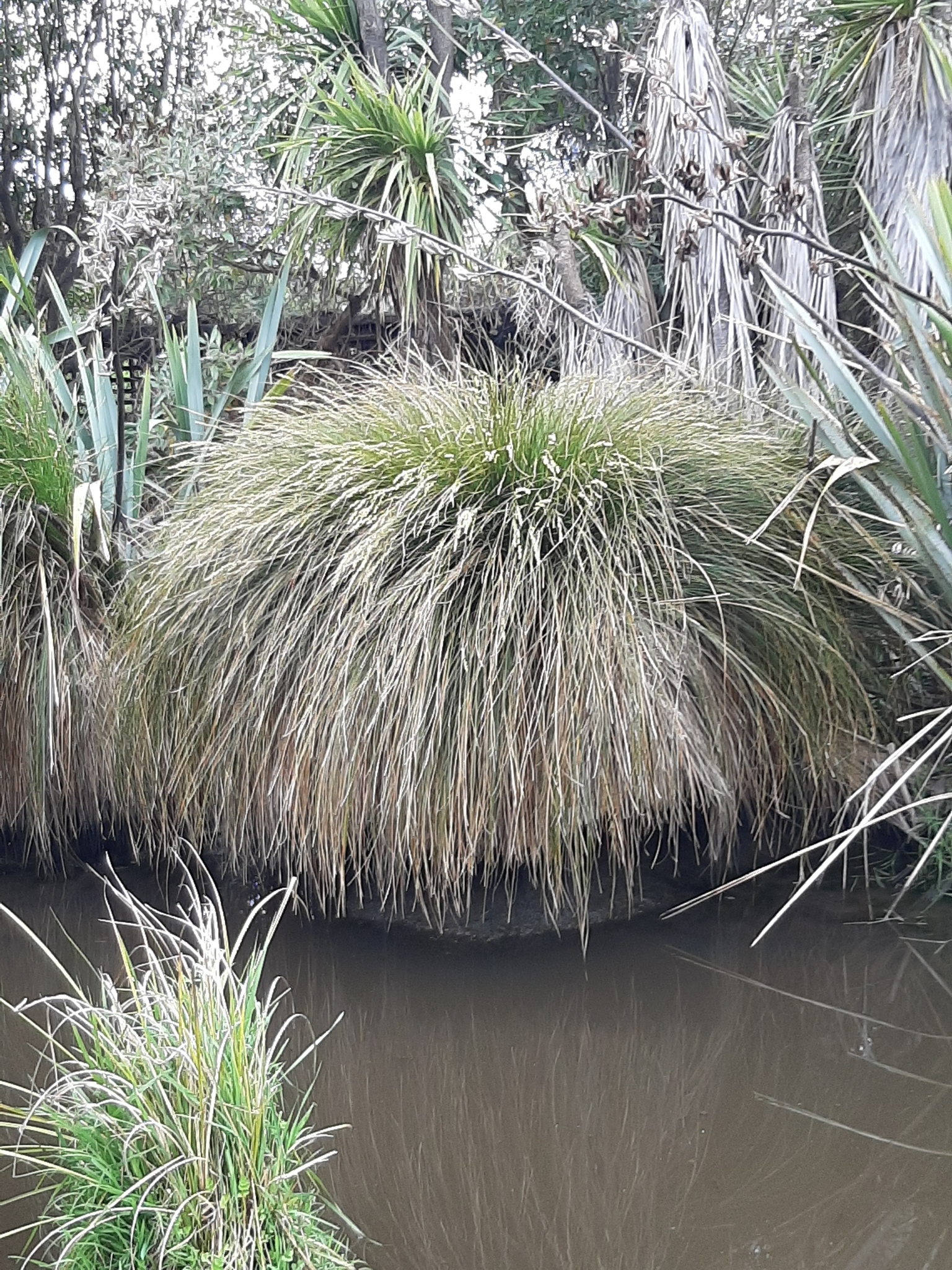
Carex secta a larval host species of I. semivittata

Larval host species include Juncus procera, Carex secta as well as on tussock grasses such as Poa cita, P. colensoi and Festuca novae-zelandiae.
