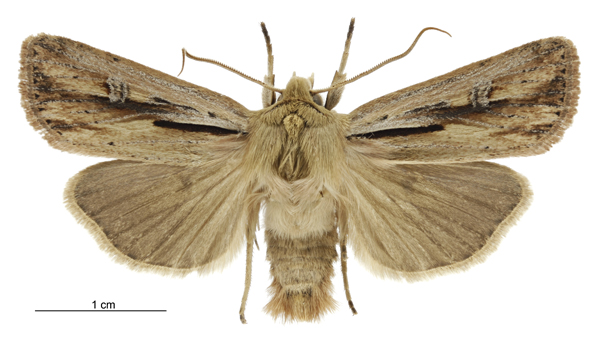
- Male
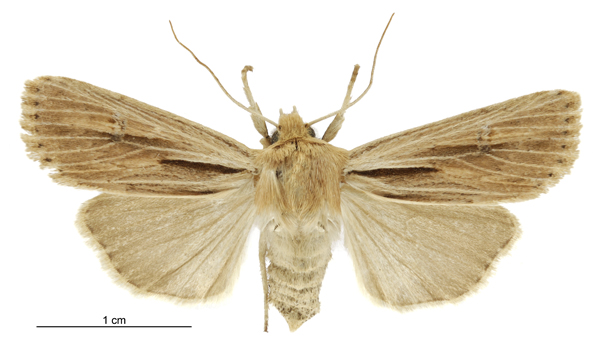
- Female

Scientific classification
- Kingdom: Animalia
- Phylum: Arthropoda
- Clade: Pancrustacea
- Class: Insecta
- Order: Lepidoptera
- Superfamily: Noctuoidea
- Family: Noctuidae
- Genus: Ichneutica
- Species: I. propria

Binomial name
- Ichneutica propria (Walker, 1856)

Synonyms
- Leucania propria Walker, 1856; Persectania basifascia Hampson, 1913; Tmetolophota propria (Walker, 1856); Graphania propria (Walker, 1856)

= Ichneutica propria =

Species of moth

Ichneutica propria is a moth of the family Noctuidae. It is endemic to New Zealand. This species is only known from Tongariro National Park and Pureora Forest in the North Island but is widespread in the South Island. I. propria might be confused with faded I. atristriga, however the later species lacks the distinctive marking on the prothorax nor does it have the black mark running through the middle of the forewing. It is very common and widespread in montane to alpine grassland areas. Although the larvae have yet to be described, they have been reared on Poa cita and Festuca novae-zelandiae and are known to feed on introduced grass species. The adults of this species are on the wing from December to mid May and are attracted to light.

== Taxonomy ==
This species was first described by Francis Walker in 1856 and named Leucania propria. The male holotype was collected at Waikouaiti near Dunedin by Mr Percy Earl and is in the collection at the Natural History Museum, London. In 1988, J. S. Dugdale in his catalogue on New Zealand Lepidoptera, placed this species within the Tmetolophota genus. In 2019 Robert Hoare undertook a major review of New Zealand Noctuidae. During this review the genus Ichneutica was greatly expanded and the genus Tmetolophota was subsumed into that genus as a synonym. As a result of this review, this species is now known as Ichneutica propria.

== Description ==
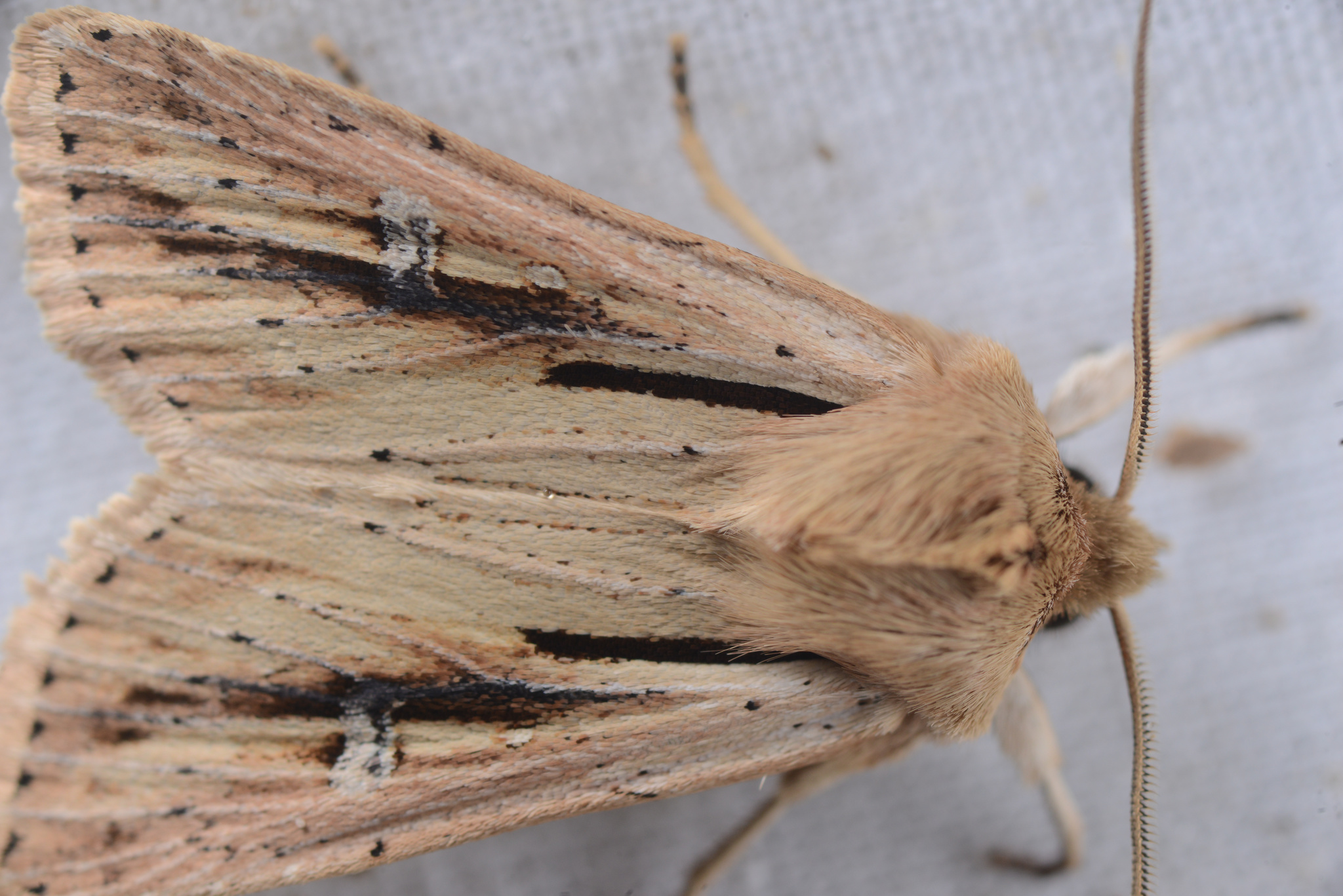
Observation of living Ichneutica propria

Walker described this species as follows:

Pale fawn-colour. Thorax a little darker than the body elsewhere, with a very slight band of black dots. Fore wings with some slight black discal lines, with a deep black basal stripe, a little in front of which there is a black discal stripe shaded with brown; the exterior and marginal black dots as usual. Hind wings slightly cinereous, with paler ciliae. Length of the body 5 lines; of the wings 12 lines.

The wingspan of the adult male of this species is between 31.5 and 39 mm and for the female is between 30 and 36 mm. It is possible that specimens of I. propria might be confused with faded I. atristriga, however the later species lacks the distinctive marking on the prothorax nor does it have the black mark running through the middle of the forewing.

== Distribution ==
I. propria is endemic to New Zealand. This species is only known from the Tongariro National Park and Pureora Forest in the North Island but is widespread in the South Island although it is more frequently found on the eastern side of that Island.

== Habitat ==
This species is very common and widespread in montane to alpine grassland areas.

== Behaviour ==
The adults of this species are on the wing from December to April but have been recorded in early to mid May. They are attracted to light. Adults of this species are known to pollinate Hoheria lyallii.

== Life history and host species ==
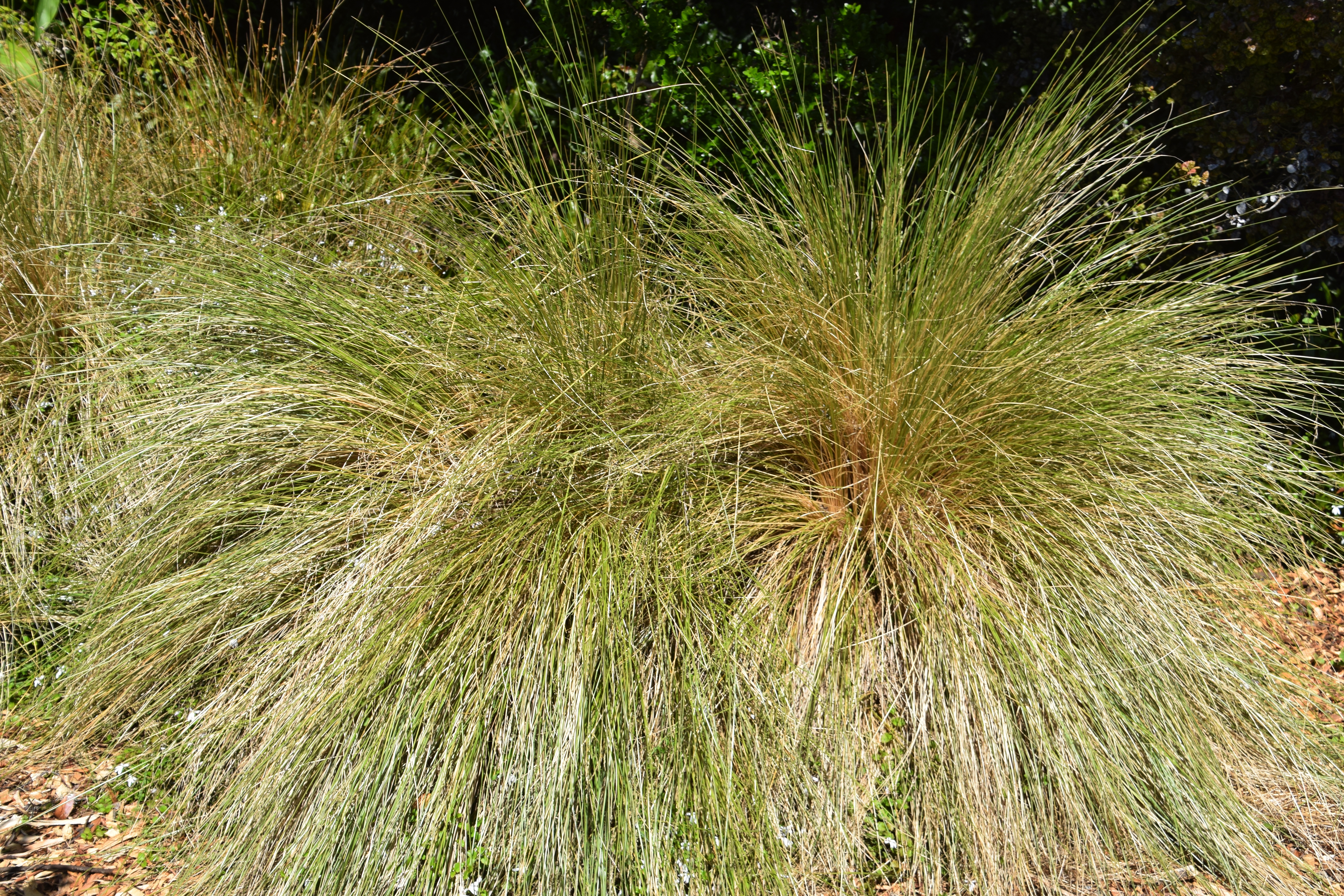
I. propria larvae have been raised on Poa cita

Although the larvae have yet to be described they have been reared on Poa cita and Festuca novae-zelandiae. The larvae also feed on introduced grass species. This adaption to feeding on introduced grass species seems to have ensured no decrease in population has taken place.
