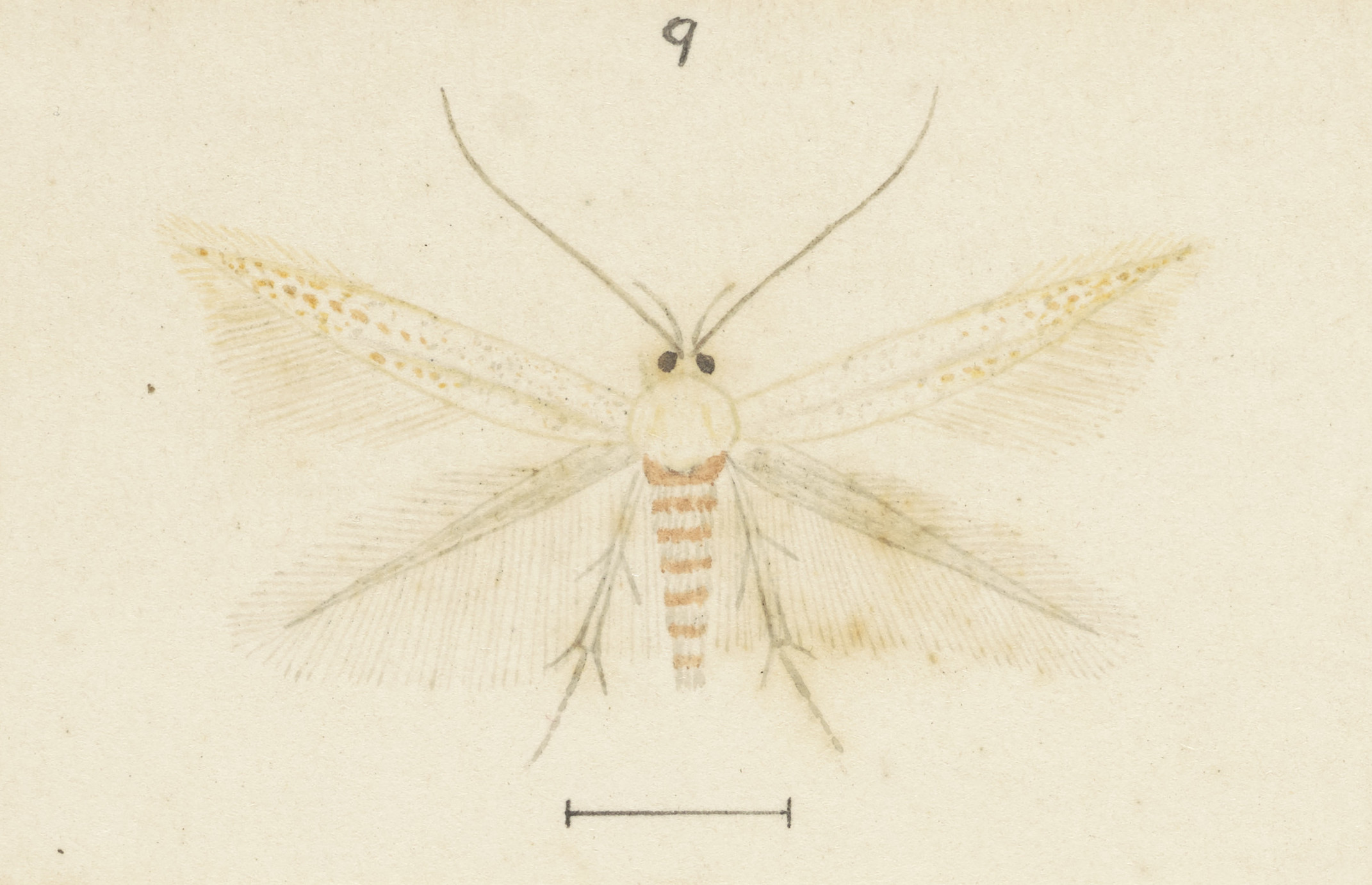

Scientific classification
- Kingdom: Animalia
- Phylum: Arthropoda
- Class: Insecta
- Order: Lepidoptera
- Family: Elachistidae
- Genus: Elachista
- Species: E. ochroleuca

Binomial name
- Elachista ochroleuca Meyrick, 1923

Synonyms
- Cosmiotes ochroleuca (Meyrick, 1923)

= Elachista ochroleuca =

Species of moth

Elachista ochroleuca is a moth in the family Elachistidae. It was described by Edward Meyrick in 1923. It is endemic to New Zealand and has been observed in the South Island. The adults of this species are day flying and are on the wing from October until March.

== Taxonomy ==
E. ochroleuca was first described in 1923 by Edward Meyrick using a specimen collected in January at Mount Aurum in Otago at 3000 ft amongst tussock grass. In 1928 George Hudson discussed and illustrated this species in his book The butterflies and moths of New Zealand. In 1971 J. S. Dugdale placed this species in the genus Cosmiotes. Dugdale followed this placement in his 1988 publication Lepidopteria - annotated catalogue, and keys to family-group taxa. In 2012 in the Inventory of New Zealand Biodiversity this species was discussed under its original name of Elachista ochroleuca. This placement was supported in 2019. The female holotype is held at the Natural History Museum, London.

== Description ==
Meyrick described this species as follows:

♂. 10mm. Head, palpi, thorax, and abdomen are white. Forewings narrowly elongate-lanceolate, apex produced, acute; 4 and 8 absent; ochreous-white; an ochreous dot on fold towards extremity : cilia white. Hindwings linear-lanceolate; 4 absent; grey-whitish : cilia whitish.

== Distribution ==
This species is endemic to New Zealand and can be found in the South Island. As well as the type locality, this specimen has been observed at Arthur's Pass and in kettle holes near Lake Ōhau as well as in grassland near Twizel.

== Behaviour ==
The adults of this species are on the wing from October until March and are day flying.

== Hosts and habitat ==
The larval host of this species is Poa cita.
