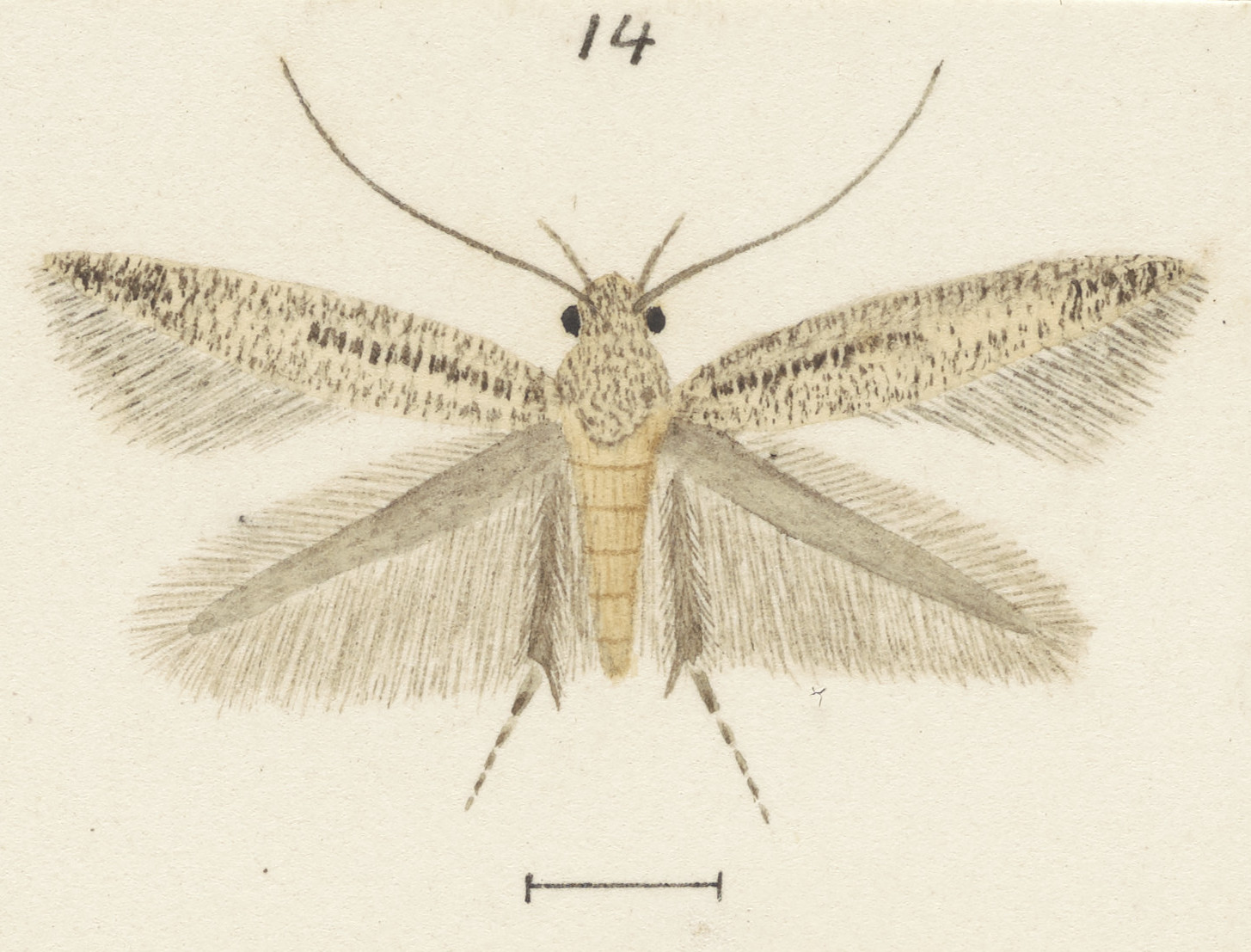

Conservation status
- Relict (NZ TCS)

Scientific classification
- Kingdom: Animalia
- Phylum: Arthropoda
- Class: Insecta
- Order: Lepidoptera
- Family: Elachistidae
- Genus: Elachista
- Species: E. helonoma

Binomial name
- Elachista helonoma (Meyrick, 1889)

Synonyms
- Cosmiotes helonoma (Meyrick, 1889)

= Elachista helonoma =

Species of moth

Elachista helonoma is a species of moth in the family Elachistidae. This species is endemic to New Zealand. It is classified as "At Risk, Relict'" by the Department of Conservation.

== Taxonomy ==
It was first described by Edward Meyrick in 1889 using specimens collected at the Port Hills in Christchurch and named Elachista helonoma. George Hudson described and illustrated the species under the same name in 1928. John S. Dugdale placed the species within the genus Cosmiotes in 1971 and followed this placement in his annotated catalogue in 1988. However, the genus Cosmiotes is now regarded as a synonym of Elachista and as a result, the species name is again Elachista helonoma. The lectotype specimen is held at the Natural History Museum, London.

== Description ==
Meyrick described the adult moth of the species as follows:

♂︎♀︎ 8–10 mm. Head and thorax ochreous-whitish, sprinkled with ochreous. Palpi white. Antennae fuscous. Abdomen grey-whitish, anal tuft ochreous-whitish. Legs dark fuscous, posterior pair ochreous-whitish. Forewings lanceolate; whitish, more or less irrorated with ochreous, especially on dorsal half; a slender ochreous-fuscous median longitudinal streak from near base to middle, and a second from above extremity of first to near apex; a fuscous dot beneath apex of first streak, sometimes obsolete; inner margin more or less obscurely brownish towards base : cilia grey- whitish. Hind-wings pale grey; cilia grey-whitish.

== Distribution ==
This species is endemic to New Zealand. It can be found in Mid Canterbury and the Mackenzie areas.

== Life cycle and behaviour ==
The larvae of this species are leaf miners and are very difficult to detect. The adults of the species are on the wing between January and March.

== Host plants and habitat ==
Elachista helonoma is found exclusively in short tussock grasslands. The likely host of this species is Poa cita.

== Conservation status ==
This species has been classified as having the "At Risk, Relict" conservation status under the New Zealand Threat Classification System.
