= Penicillium novae-zelandiae =

Scientific classification
- Kingdom: Fungi
- Division: Ascomycota
- Class: Eurotiomycetes
- Order: Eurotiales
- Family: Aspergillaceae
- Genus: Penicillium
- Species: P. novae-zelandiae

Binomial name
- Penicillium novae-zelandiae J.F.H. Beyma 1940

Type strain
- 684, ATCC 10473, CBS 137.41, FRR 2128, IFO 31748, IMI 040584, IMI 040584ii, MUCL 38802, NBRC 31748, NRRL 2128, QM 1934, VKM F-2886

Synonyms
- Penicillium novae-zeelandiae Penicillium novaezeelandiae

Species of fungus

Penicillium novae-zelandiae is an anamorph species of fungus in the genus Penicillium which was isolated from the plant Festuca novae-zelandiae. Penicillium novae-zelandiae produces patulin, 3-hydroxybenzyl alcohol and gentisyl alcohol
