= Glyphipterix oxymachaera =

Scientific classification
- Kingdom: Animalia
- Phylum: Arthropoda
- Clade: Pancrustacea
- Class: Insecta
- Order: Lepidoptera
- Family: Glyphipterigidae
- Genus: Glyphipterix
- Species: G. oxymachaera

Binomial name
- Glyphipterix oxymachaera (Meyrick, 1880)

Synonyms
- Phryganostola oxymachaera Meyrick, 1880

Species of moth endemic to New Zealand

Glyphipterix oxymachaera is a species of sedge moth in the genus Glyphipterix. It was first described by Edward Meyrick in 1880. It is endemic to New Zealand and has been observed in the North and South Islands. This species inhabits dry grassland including grassland dominated by Poa cita. Larvae bore into the stems of their host plant Poa cita. Adults are variable in appearance with the intensity of a specimen's ground colour differing considerably. Adults are day flying and are on the wing most commonly from November until March. Adults are rarely attracted to light.

== Taxonomy ==
This species was first described by Edward Meyrick in 1880 and originally named Phryganostola oxymachaera. In 1913 Meyrick placed this species in the genus Glyphipterix. In 1927 Alfred Philpott examined the male genitalia of this species. George Hudson discussed and illustrated this species under the name Glyphipterix oxymachaera in his 1928 book The butterflies and moths of New Zealand. In 1988 John S. Dugdale confirmed this placement. The male lectotype, collected in the Port Hills of Christchurch by Meyrick in January, is held at the Natural History Museum, London.

== Description ==
Illustration of female by Hudson.

Meyrick originally described the adults of this species as follows:

♂♀. 4 3/4"-5 3/4". Head whitish. Thorax whitish, sometimes suffused with fuscous. Palpi white, second joint with two fuscous-grey rings, beneath with a long loose projecting tuft of white hairs, mixed with a few fuscous-grey. Antennae dark fuscous. Abdomen very elongate, especially in ♀, varying from pale ochreous to dark fuscous-grey ; with whitish rings. Legs fuscous-grey or ochreous-grey, posterior tibiae white at apex, all tarsi fuscous or dark fuscous with white rings at apex of joints. Fore-wings elongate, narrow, hardly dilated, dull fuscous, sometimes suffused with whitish along costa, with white dark-margined markings ; a broad streak along inner margin from base to beyond middle, thence attenuated and directed obliquely upwards, ending on middle of disc at 2/3 from base ; eight rather short oblique costal streaks, none reaching half across wing, first at 1/4, produced along costa towards base, all sometimes rendered obsolete by a general white suffusion of the costa ; a rather short oblique streak from anal angle, ending in a bright silvery-metallic spot on disc; a small silvery-metallic spot on hind-margin below middle ; cilia white, with a black apical hook, and intersected by a strong black line, except where a white black-margined indentation meets hind-margin beneath apex. Hind-wings fuscous-grey, cilia whitish.

Hudson stated that this was a very variable species with the intensity of the ground colouring of specimens differing considerably. Some specimens are quite brown with distinct costal streaks while others have a few faint bluish dots on the tip of the wing.

== Distribution ==
G. oxymachaera is endemic to New Zealand. It has been observed in both the North and South Islands.

== Habitat and hosts ==
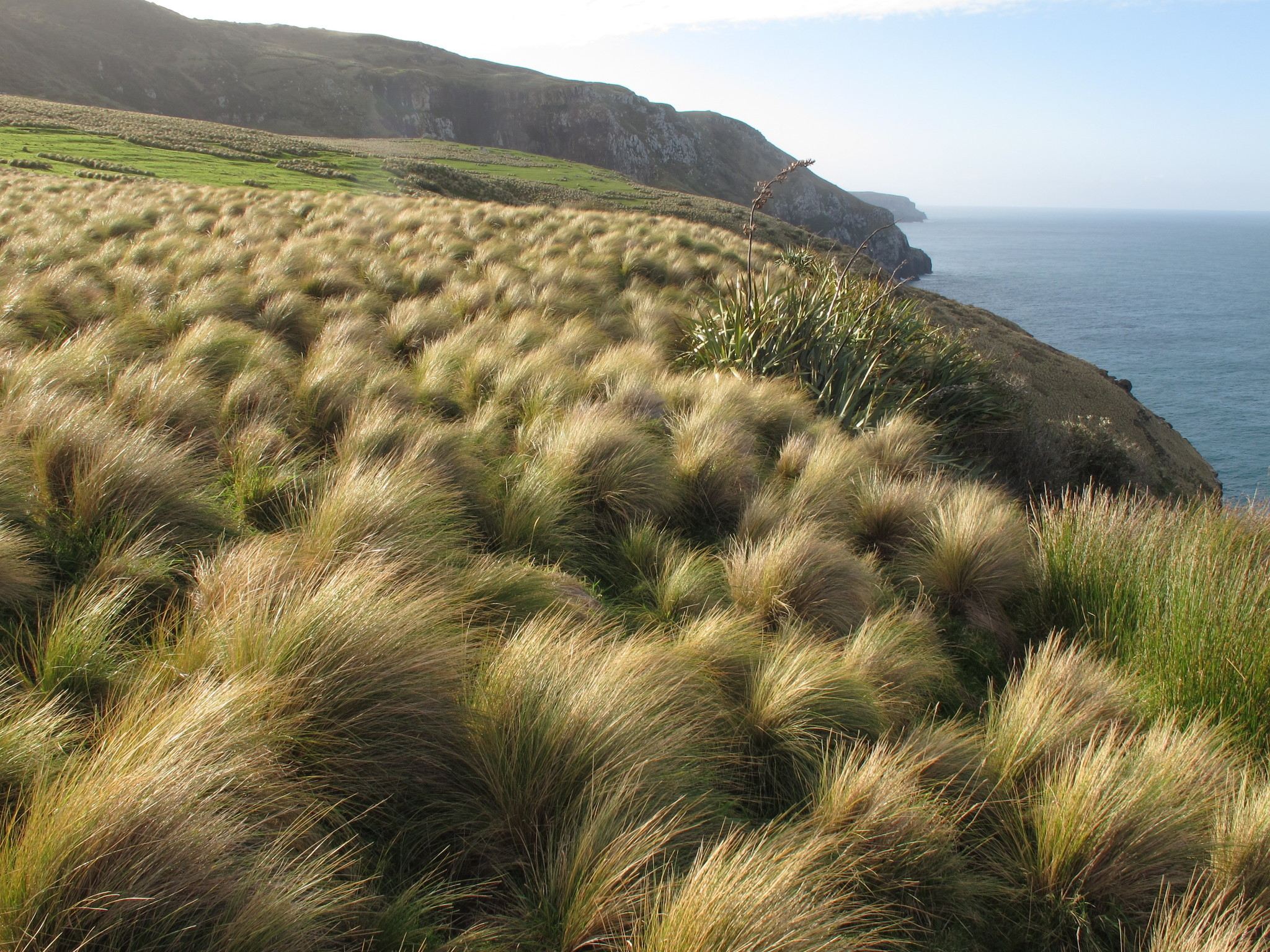
Silver Tussock (Poa cita)

This species frequents dry grassy habitat including silver tussock habitat. Larvae have been observed boring the stems of silver tussock.

== Behaviour ==
Adults are day flying and can observed on the wing most commonly from November until March. This moth is rarely attracted to light.

== Gallery showing adult variation ==
Pale form

Light brown form

Intermediate form

Dark brown form
