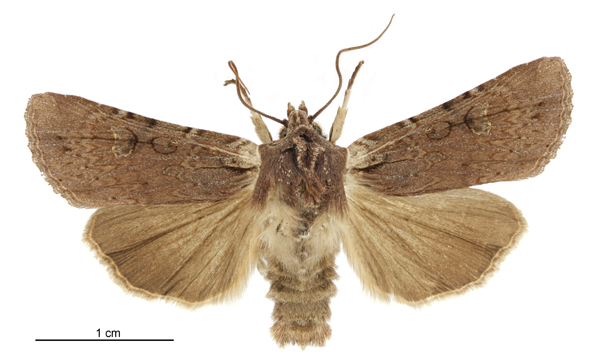
- Male
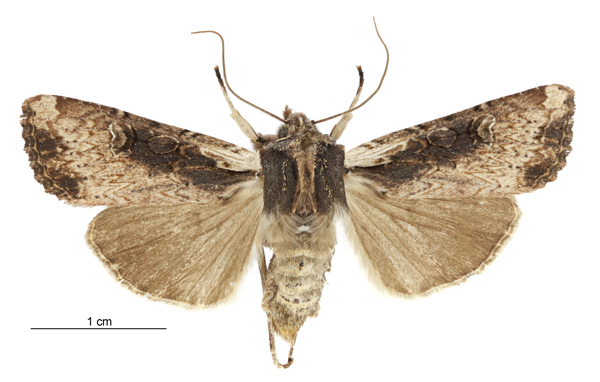
- Female

Scientific classification
- Kingdom: Animalia
- Phylum: Arthropoda
- Clade: Pancrustacea
- Class: Insecta
- Order: Lepidoptera
- Superfamily: Noctuoidea
- Family: Noctuidae
- Genus: Ichneutica
- Species: I. omoplaca

Binomial name
- Ichneutica omoplaca (Meyrick, 1887)

Synonyms
- Mamestra omoplaca Meyrick, 1887; Melanchra umbra Hudson, 1903; Graphania omoplaca (Meyrick, 1887); Graphania umbra (Hudson, 1903); Morrisonia macropis Hampson, 1918; Graphania macropis (Hampson, 1918)

= Ichneutica omoplaca =

Species of moth

Ichneutica omoplaca is a moth of the family Noctuidae. It is endemic to New Zealand. It is widespread from the Bay of Plenty in the North Island down to Southland in the South Island. Specimens have also been collected from the Auckland Islands. It lives in a variety of habitats including beech forest clearings and tussock grasslands. This species has been recorded that some of the larval hosts of this species include Poa cita, Dactylis glomerata and it has been reared on Plantago lanceolata. The larva is undescribed but pupae have been found in a pine plantation in soil under weeds. Adults of this species are on the wing from October to March. The adult moths are variable in appearance but the diagnostic feature is the pale ochreous to white colouring between the basal streak and the costa which contrasts with the ground colour of the forewing.

== Taxonomy ==
This species was described by Edward Meyrick in 1887 using a specimen collected near Lake Coleridge and Rakaia and named Mamestra omoplaca. The female lectotype, collected at Rakaia, is held at the Natural History Museum, London. In 1988 J. S. Dugdale placed this species within the Graphania genus. In 2019 Robert Hoare undertook a major review of New Zealand Noctuidae. During this review the genus Ichneutica was greatly expanded and the genus Graphania was subsumed into that genus as a synonym. As a result of this review, this species is now known as Ichneutica omoplaca.

== Description ==
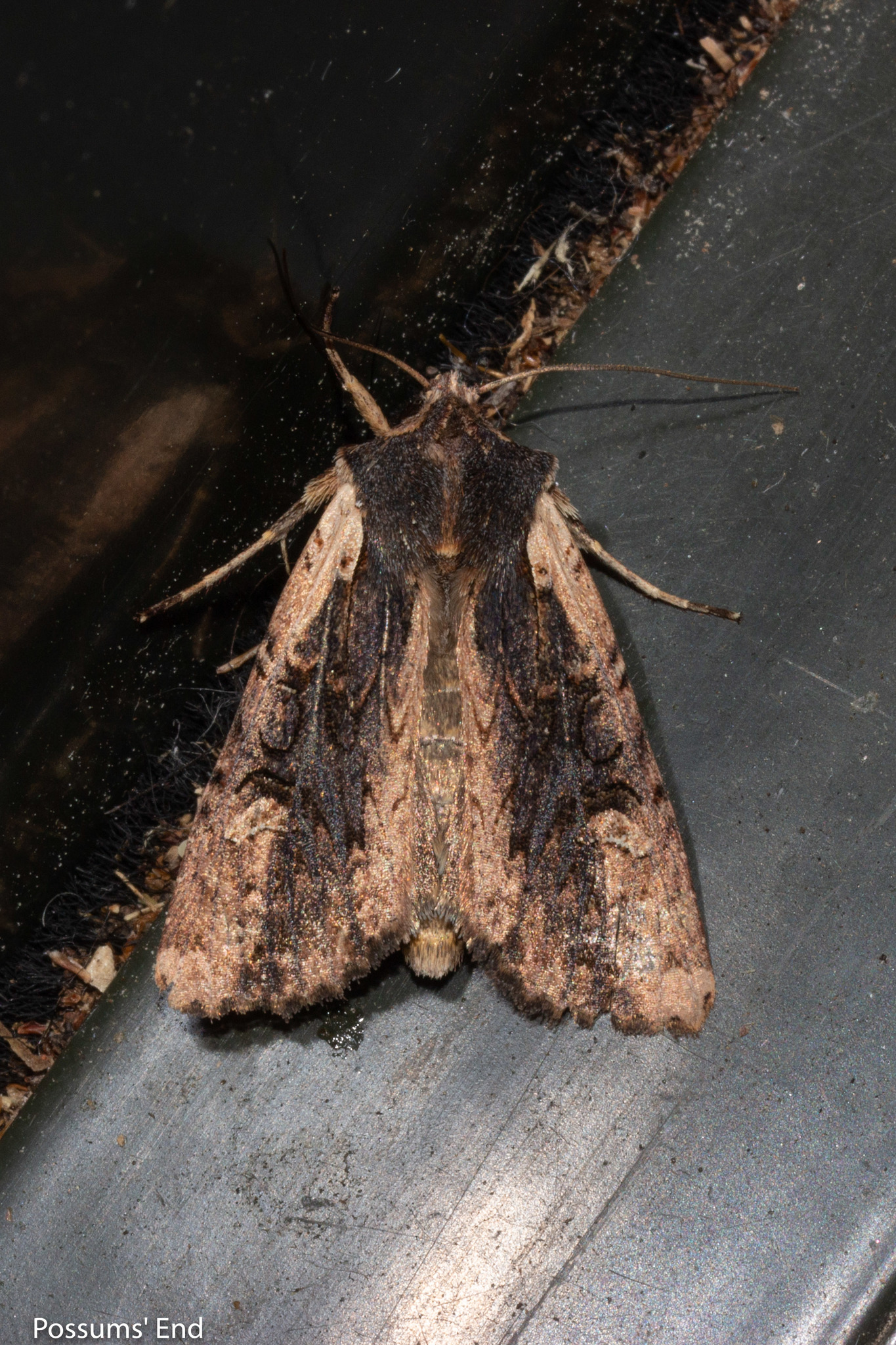
Observation of living Ichneutica omoplaca

Meyrick described this species as follows:

Male, female. — 40-41 mm. Head, palpi, and thorax dark reddish-fuscous, sometimes blackish-tinged; thorax with rather large double anterior crest, an anterior black anteriorly ochreous-margined angulated line, apex of anterior angles ochreous-whitish. Antennas fuscous, in male submoniliform, moderately ciliated. Abdomen grey, and tuft reddish-whitish. Legs reddish-fuscous mixed with blackish, anterior pair ochreous-whitish, with three apical joints of tarsi black. Forewings moderately dilated, costa almost straight, apex obtuse, hind-margin waved, obliquely rounded; reddish-fuscous; a short black median streak from base, margined above with ochreous-white; space between this and costa marked with suffused ochreous-whitish lines; in one specimen a blackish suffusionextending from base of inner margin obliquely to orbicular and reniform, space between this and subterminal line suffused with pale whitish-ochreous; orbicular and reniform blackish-fuscous, black-margined, connected by a blackish-fuscous spot; orbicular large, roundish; reniform with outer edge white; claviform small, suboval, blackish-fuscous; lines indistinct; subterminal obscurely paler or hardly traceable, with two somewhat acute dentations below middle; hind-marginal space mixed with blackish-fuscous : cilia reddish-fuscous mixed with blackish. Hindwings fuscous-grey; cilia grey- whitish, with a grey line.

The wingspan of the adult male of this species is between 31 and 41 mm and for the female is between 33 and 43 mm. This species is variable but the diagnostic feature is the pale ochreous to white colouring between the basal streak and the costa as it is more apparent as a result of the darker ground colour of the forewing. Where there is less of a contrast this species is possibly confused with. I. lindsayorum. I. lindsayorum normally has a much lighter thorax as well as a broader forewing with more arched costa.

== Distribution ==
It is endemic to New Zealand. This species is widespread from the Bay of Plenty in the North Island down to Southland in the South Island. Specimens have also been collected from the Auckland Islands. It has not been found in the northern part of the North Island.

== Habitat ==
This species lives in a variety of habitats including beech forest clearings and tussock grasslands.

== Behaviour ==
Adults of this species are on the wing from October to March. They almost always emerge earlier in the season than I. lindsayorum. Adults are attracted to light and have been collected via a mercury vapour light trap. They are known to pollinate Leptospermum scoparium.

== Life history and host species ==
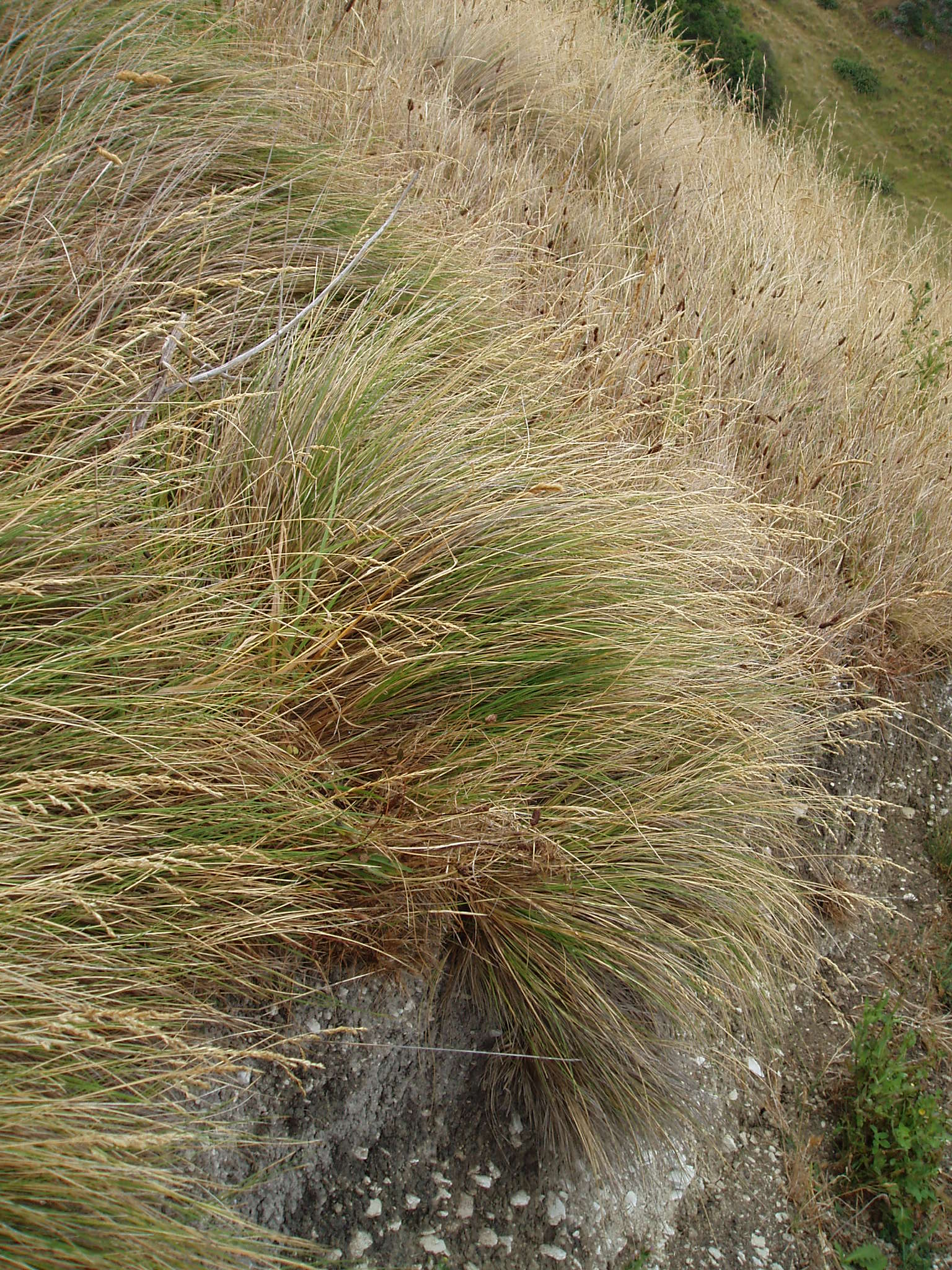
Poa cita, a larval host species of I. omoplaca

Reports on the life history of this species are lacking but it has been recorded that some of the larval hosts of this species include Poa cita, Dactylis glomerata and it has been reared on Plantago lanceolata. The larva is undescribed but pupae have been found in a pine plantation in soil under weeds.
