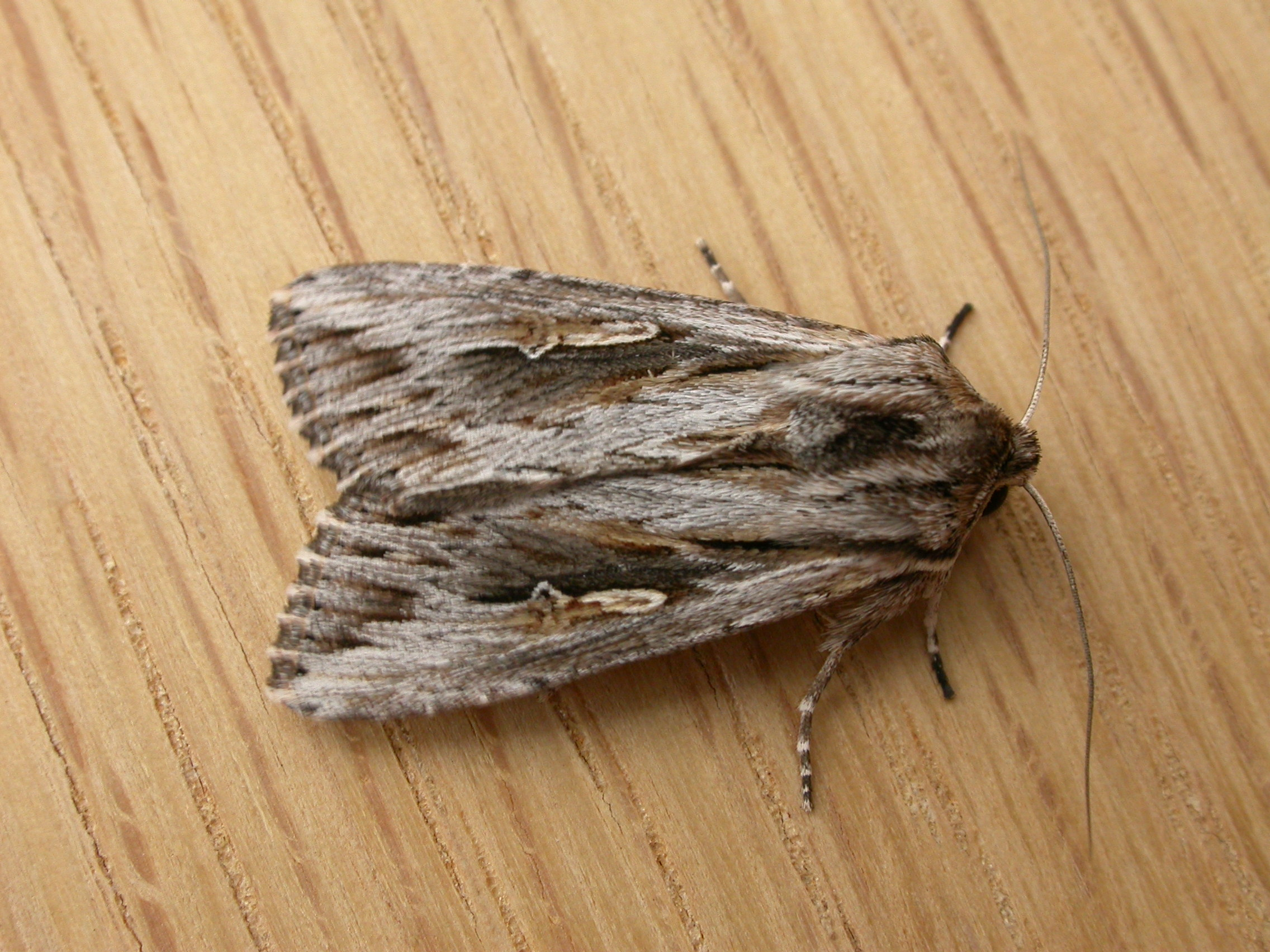
- Persectania ewingii

Scientific classification
- Kingdom: Animalia
- Phylum: Arthropoda
- Class: Insecta
- Order: Lepidoptera
- Superfamily: Noctuoidea
- Family: Noctuidae
- Subfamily: Hadeninae
- Genus: Persectania; Hampson, 1905

= Persectania =

Genus of moths

Persectania is a genus of moths of the family Noctuidae.

== Species ==
Species in this genus are as follows:

- Persectania aversa (Walker, 1856)
- Persectania dyscrita Common, 1954
- Persectania ewingii (Westwood, 1839)
