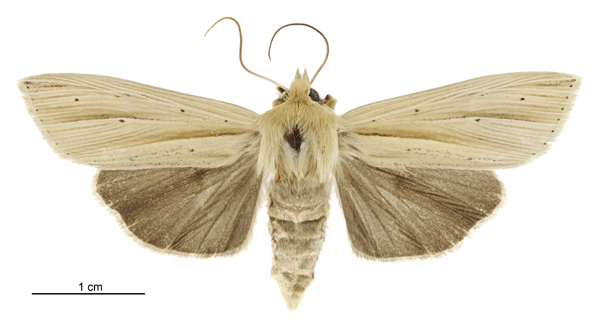
- Female
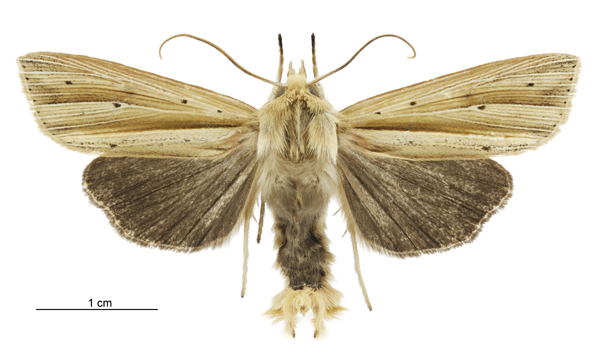
- Male

Scientific classification
- Kingdom: Animalia
- Phylum: Arthropoda
- Clade: Pancrustacea
- Class: Insecta
- Order: Lepidoptera
- Superfamily: Noctuoidea
- Family: Noctuidae
- Genus: Ichneutica
- Species: I. sulcana

Binomial name
- Ichneutica sulcana (Fereday, 1880)

Synonyms
- Leucania sulcana Fereday, 1880; Tmetolophota sulcana (Fereday 1880)

= Ichneutica sulcana =

Species of moth, endemic to New Zealand

Ichneutica sulcana, the dark underwing wainscot, is a moth of the family Noctuidae. It is endemic to New Zealand and can be found throughout the North, South and Stewart Islands at a range of altitudes from the lowlands to the alpine zone. This species prefers to live in native grass, shrub and wetland habitats as well as in native forest. The larval host plants of this species are forest grasses and sedges and larvae have been reared on Microlaena avenacea and species within the genus Carex. The larva pupates in the soil. Adults are on the wing from December to May but have also been recorded in August and September in the northern parts of the North Island. They are attracted to sugar traps as well as to light. I. sulcana and I. supersulcana are very similar in appearance but can be distinguished as there are differences in the male abdomen and genitalia of the two species. Also these two species do not appear to share a range as I. supersulcana seems to prefer to live at higher altitudes than I. sulcana. I. sulcana might also be confused with I. semivittata but I. sulcana is a larger species with a much darker abdomen and hindwing, and has only 1 to 3 dots on the forewing postmedian line.

== Taxonomy ==
This species was described by Richard William Fereday in 1880 and originally named Leucania sulcana. The female lectotype was collected Rowe's Bush in Akaroa by Fereday and is held at the Canterbury Museum. In 1988 J. S. Dugdale placed this species within the Tmetolophota genus. In 2019 Robert Hoare undertook a major review of New Zealand Noctuidae. During this review the genus Ichneutica was greatly expanded and the genus Tmetolophota was subsumed into that genus as a synonym. As a result of this review, this species is now known as Ichneutica sulcana.

== Description ==
Eggs of this species are hemispherical in shape and green in colour with a honeycomb on the surface.

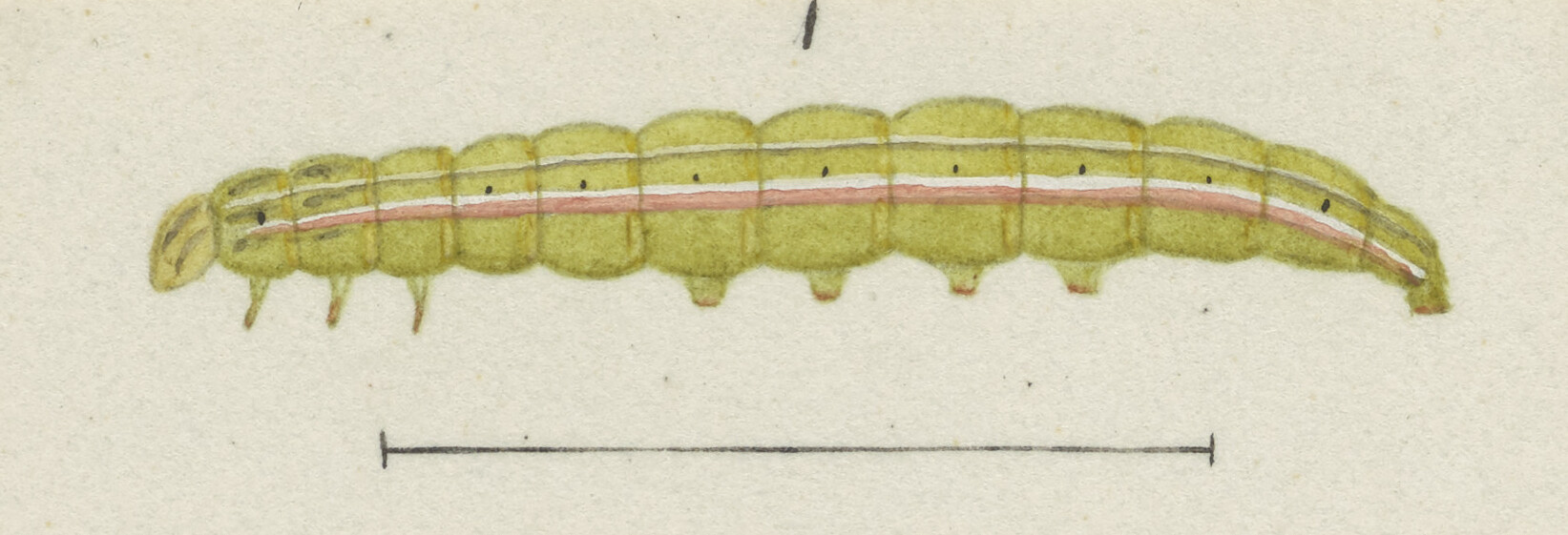
Illustration of larva of I. sulcana.

George Hudson described the larva of this species as follows:

The full grown larva is about 1 3/4 inch in length, much attenuated posteriorly, pale reddish-ochreous, with numerous fine wavy darker lines; the subdorsal and lateral lines are straight and much more conspicuous; the spiracles are black, and there is a dark olive-green line down the midback.

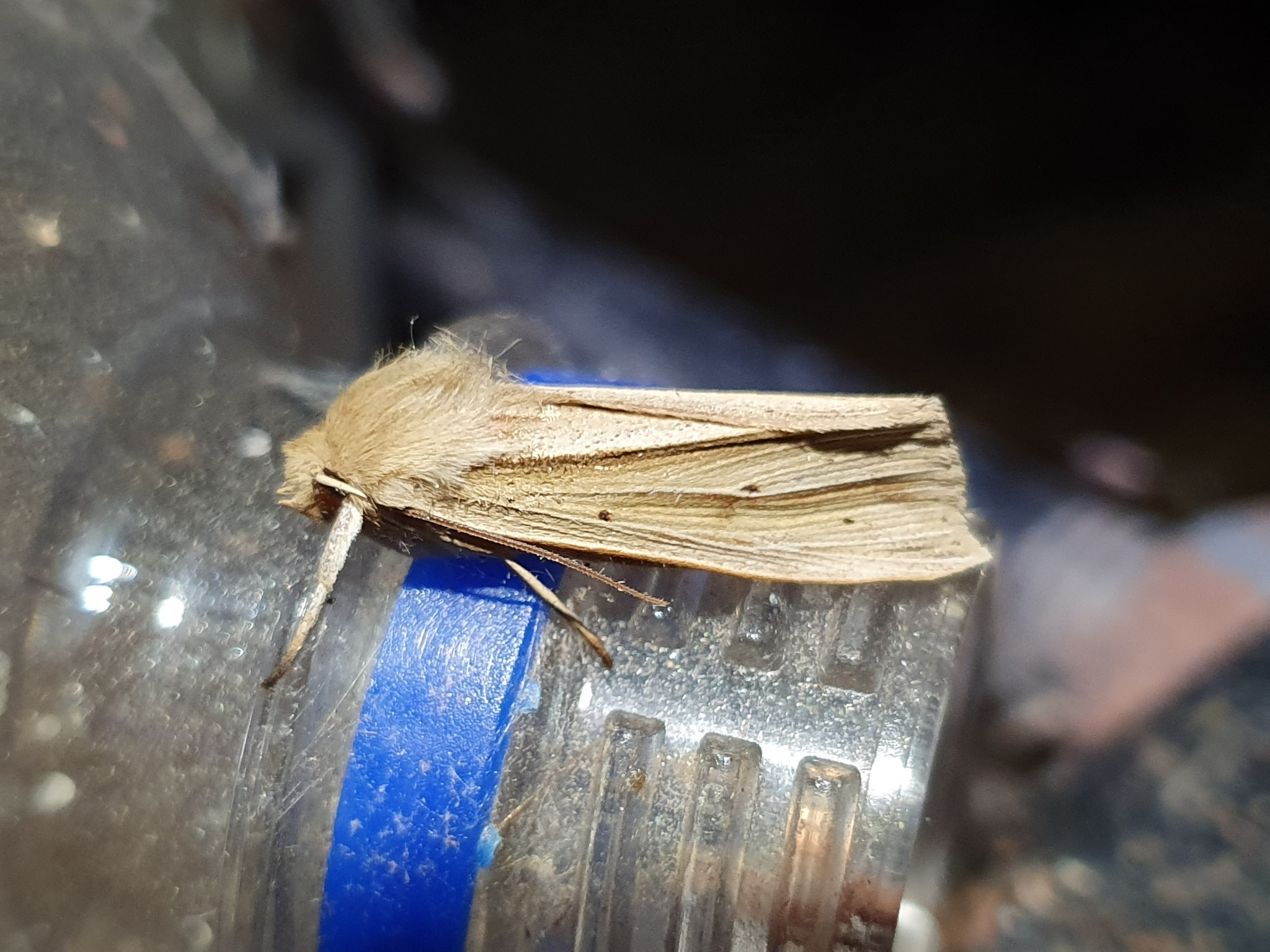
Observation of live I. sulcana

George Hudson described the adults of I. sulcana as follows:

The expansion of the wings is from 1 1/2 to 1 3/4 inches. The fore-wings are light ochreous with the veins white; there is a shaded, brownish, longitudinal streak near the apex, another from the end of the cell to the termen, a stronger streak from the base of the wing to near the tornus, and another along the dorsum; there is a minute black dot near the base above the middle, a slightly larger dot at about one-third, a conspicuous dot between the origins of veins 3 and 4, and a very minute dot on vein 6. Hind-wings dark blackish-grey, cilia paler.

The wingspan of the adult male of this species is between 35 and 46 mm and for the female is between 42 and 48 mm. Specimens from the northern North Island can be smaller and have more pronounced shading on the forewing.

I. sulcana and I. supersulcana are very similar in appearance with no reliable visible differences between the two having been discovered. However I. supersulcana tends to be larger and paler with less well defined longitudinal dark streaks to its forewings. There are distinct differences in the male abdomen and genitalia of these two species. As at 2019 the two species have not been discovered to share a range as I. supersulcana appears restricted to the higher altitudes of the Tararua Range and Tongariro National Park. I. sulcana might also be confused with I. semivittata but I. sulcana is a larger species with a much darker abdomen and hindwing, and has only 1 to 3 dots on the forewing postmedian line.

When at rest amongst grass this species is well camouflaged.

== Distribution ==
This species is endemic to New Zealand. I. sulcana are fairly common and are found throughout the North, South and Stewart Islands at a range of altitudes from the lowlands to the alpine zone. This species is said to be more common in the North Island.

== Habitat ==
I. sulcana prefers to live in native grass, shrub and wetland habitats as well as in native forest.

== Behaviour ==
Adults of this species are on the wing from December to May but have been recorded as on the wing in August and September in the northern parts of the North Island. Adults are attracted to light and have been collected via sugar traps as well as a mercury vapour light trap.

== Life cycle ==
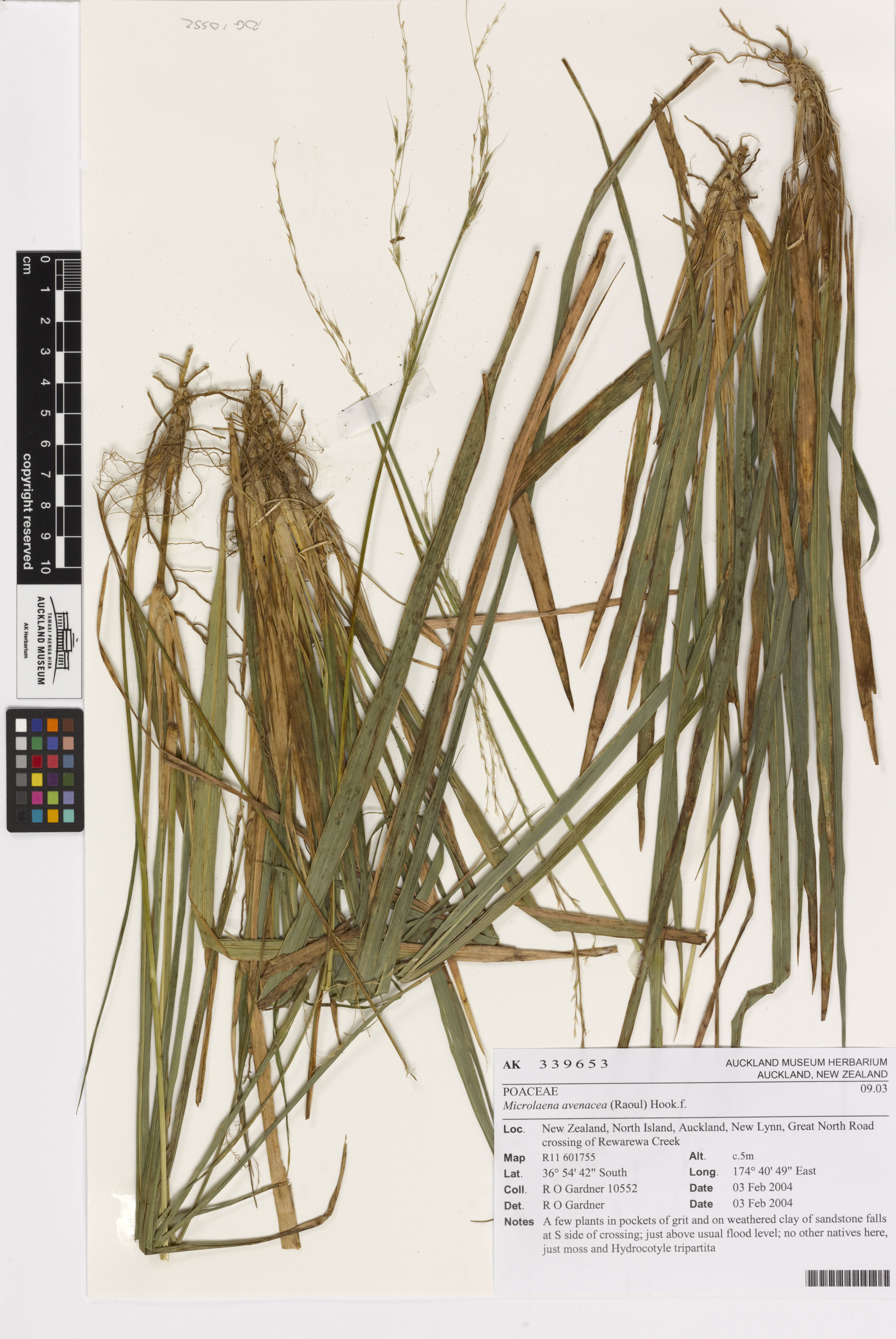
I. sulcana larvae have been reared on Microlaena avenacea

The egg catches after about a week to a bright green larva. After feeding for a period, hibernates during winter during winter and is fully grown in spring. The larva pupates in a space just beneath the surface of the soil. The pupa is coloured brown and the adult moth emerges after a few weeks.

== Host species ==
The larval host plants of I. sulcana include Gahnia setifolia, Melicytus ramiflorus, and Microlaena avenacea as well as forest grasses and sedges and species within the genus Carex.
