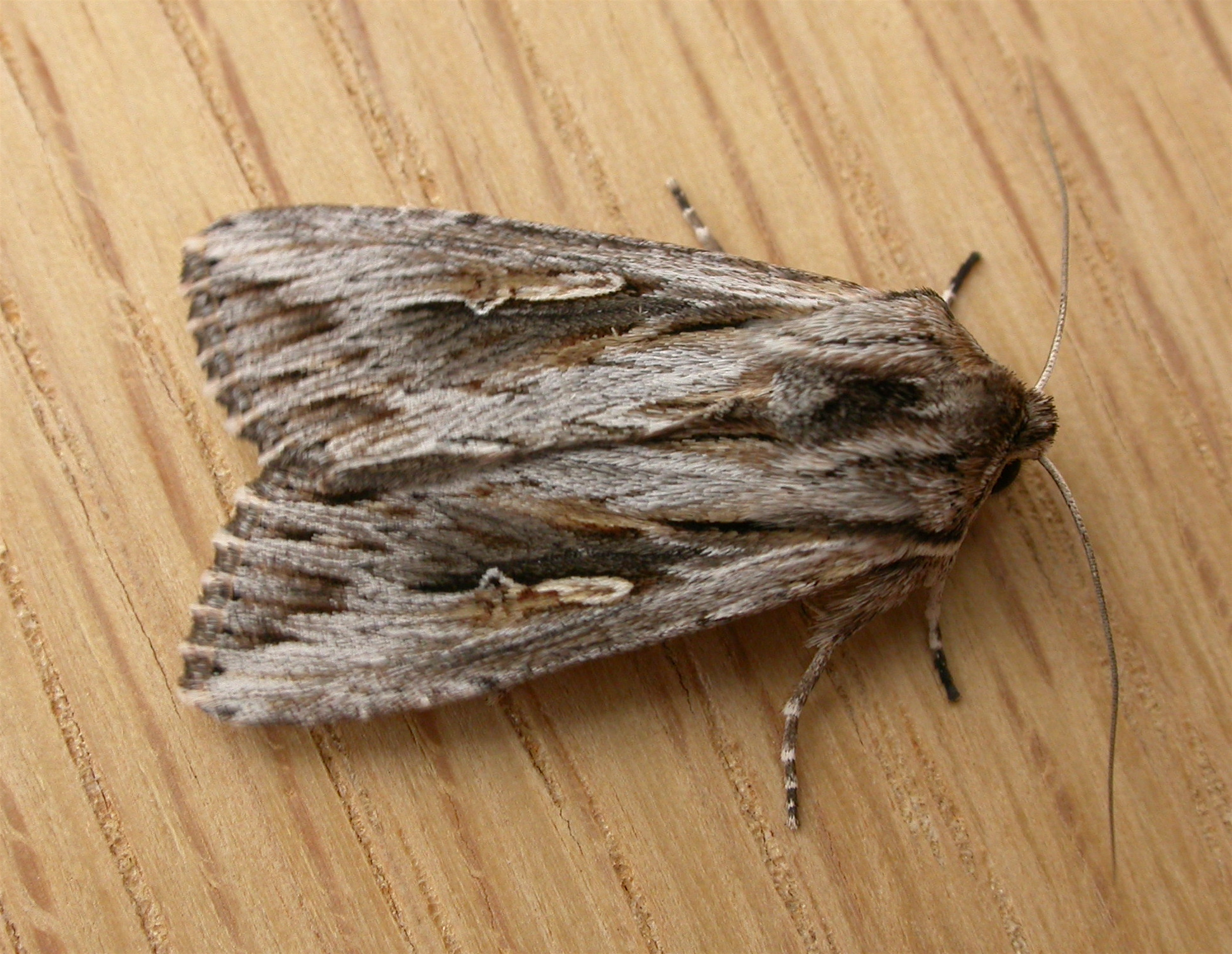

Scientific classification
- Kingdom: Animalia
- Phylum: Arthropoda
- Class: Insecta
- Order: Lepidoptera
- Superfamily: Noctuoidea
- Family: Noctuidae
- Genus: Persectania
- Species: P. ewingii

Binomial name
- Persectania ewingii Westwood, 1839

Synonyms
- Noctua evingi

= Persectania ewingii =

Species of moth

Persectania ewingii, commonly known as the southern armyworm, is a species of moth in the family Noctuidae. It is found in the southern and eastern regions of Australia and often migrates across the Bass Strait to Tasmania.

The wingspan of Persectania ewingii is approximately 40 mm.
