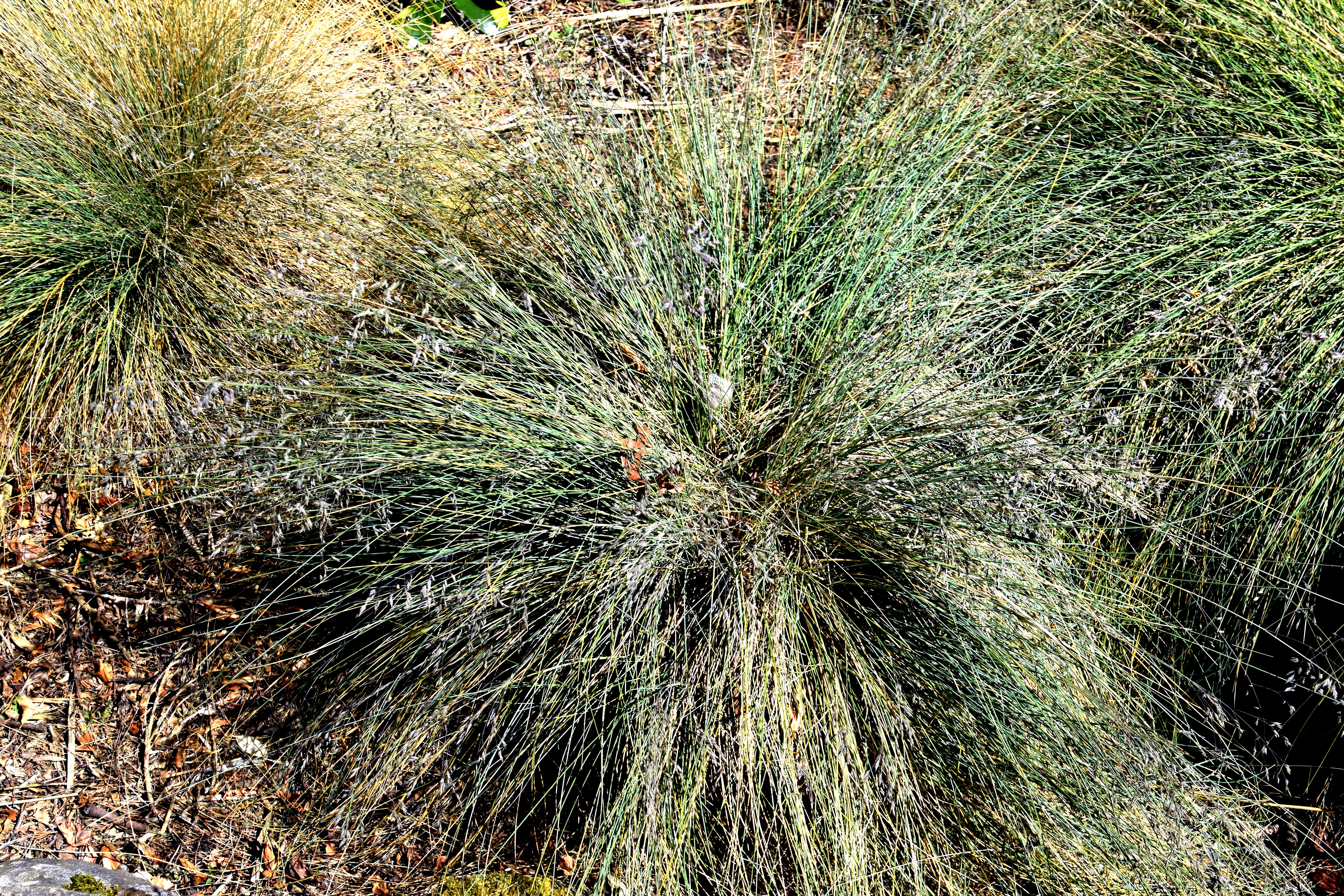
- Habit

Scientific classification
- Kingdom: Plantae
- Clade: Embryophytes
- Clade: Tracheophytes
- Clade: Angiosperms
- Clade: Monocots
- Clade: Commelinids
- Order: Poales
- Family: Poaceae
- Subfamily: Pooideae
- Genus: Poa
- Species: P. colensoi

Binomial name
- Poa colensoi Hook.f.

Synonyms
- Poa colensoi var. breviligulata Petrie; Poa colensoi var. guthrie-smithiana (Petrie) Zotov; Poa colensoi var. intermedia Cheeseman; Poa guthrie-smithiana Petrie; Poa intermedia Buchanan

= Poa colensoi =

Species of flowering plant

Poa colensoi, the blue tussock, is a species of cool-season grass in the family Poaceae, endemic to New Zealand. It is considered the native grass species with the highest potential for use in high altitude livestock grazing systems, as it has good palatibility and above average regrowth rates.
