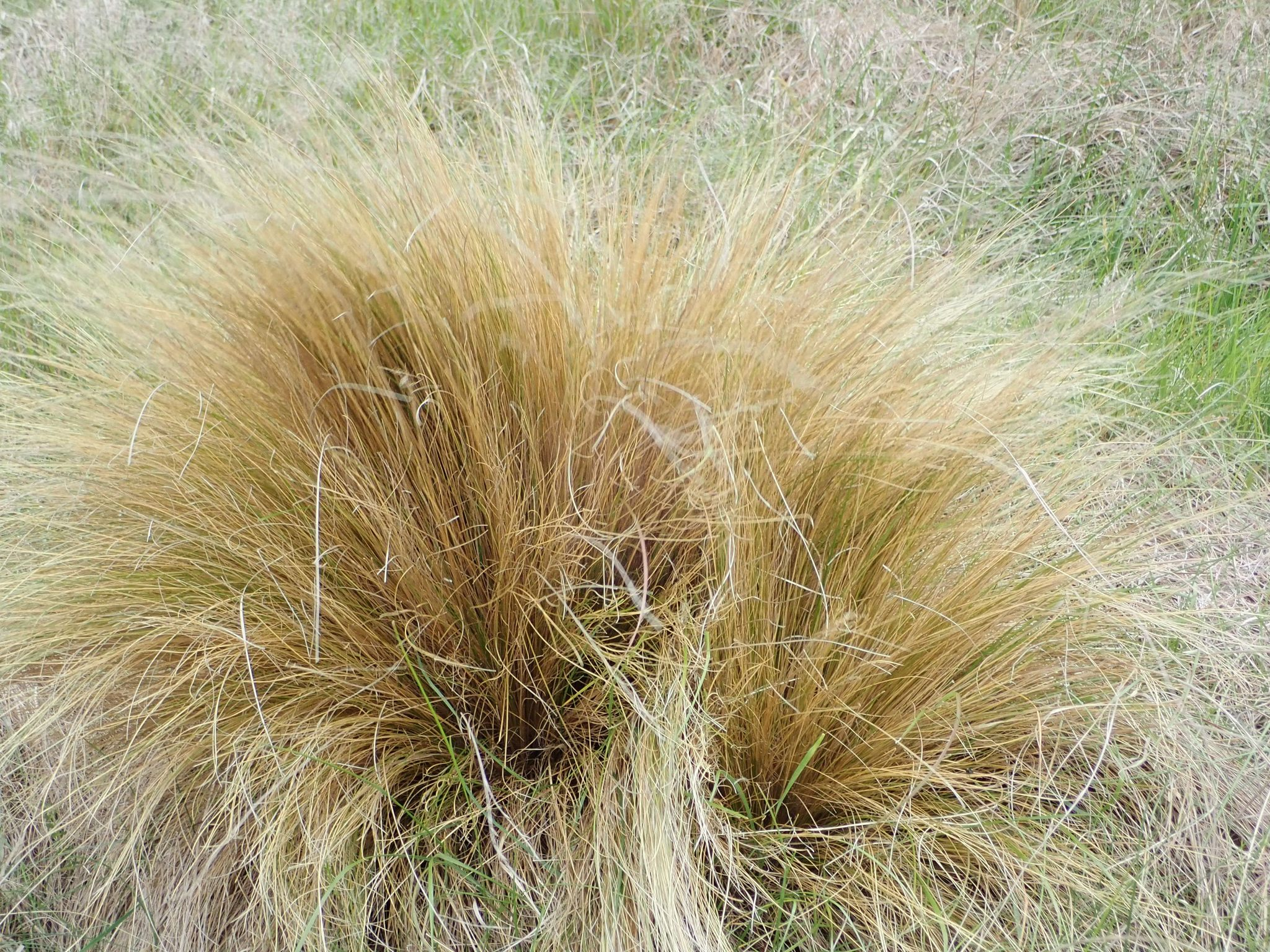
- Near Sutton Salt Lake, New Zealand

Scientific classification
- Kingdom: Plantae
- Clade: Tracheophytes
- Clade: Angiosperms
- Clade: Monocots
- Clade: Commelinids
- Order: Poales
- Family: Poaceae
- Subfamily: Pooideae
- Genus: Festuca
- Species: F. novae-zelandiae

Binomial name
- Festuca novae-zelandiae (Hack.) Cockayne

Synonyms
- Festuca novae-zealandiae orth. var.; Festuca ovina subsp. novae-zelandiae Hack.; Festuca ovina var. novae-zelandiae (Hack.) Cheeseman

= Festuca novae-zelandiae =

Species of grass

Festuca novae-zelandiae is a species of long-lived caespitose grass in the family Poaceae. It is native to New Zealand. It is perennial and grows in temperate biomes. It was first described in 1903 by Eduard Hackel.
