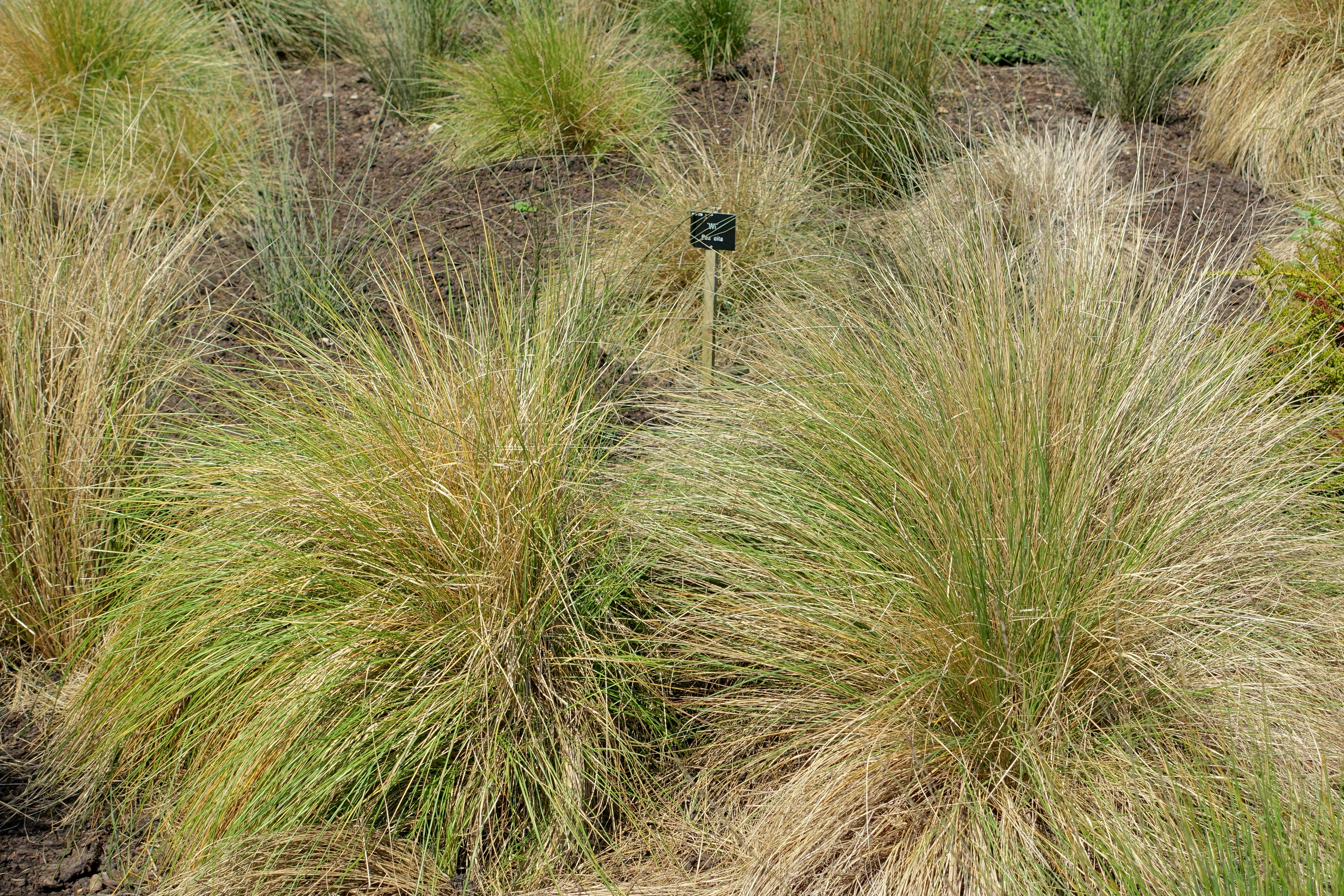

Scientific classification
- Kingdom: Plantae
- Clade: Tracheophytes
- Clade: Angiosperms
- Clade: Monocots
- Clade: Commelinids
- Order: Poales
- Family: Poaceae
- Subfamily: Pooideae
- Genus: Poa
- Species: P. cita

Binomial name
- Poa cita Edgar

Synonyms
- Poa caespitosa Spreng; Poa caespitosa var. leioclada Hack.; Poa caespitosa var. planifolia Petrie; Poa laevis var. filifolia Hook.f.

= Poa cita =

Species of plant

Poa cita, commonly known as the silver tussock, or wī, which is also a Māori name, or by the Māori name pātītī, is a grass of the family Poaceae that is endemic to New Zealand. Poa cita was described and named by Elizabeth Edgar in 1986, having previously being named Poa caespitosa.

It is found throughout most of New Zealand, from the Kermadec Islands to Stewart Island / Rakiura and out to the Chatham Islands, but not known from Raglan to Manawatū in the west of the North Island, except on Mount Taranaki.

It grows to 0.3–1.0 metres tall, and sometimes hangs as much as 2 metres long down steep banks. It has very fine, narrow leaves, usually 1–1.5 millimetres and up to 2.5 millimetres wide. Leaf width varies through the country, with narrow, needle-like leaves in the central North Island and relatively wide leaves in the northern North Island.
