= List of canonically crowned Marian images in Poland =

Below is an complete list of the canonically crowned Marian images venerated in the Catholic Church in Poland. As of 2026, there have been 216 Marian images in Poland that were granted the honor of coronation by the Holy See, since the first in 1717. (Note: Several Marian images were personally crowned by Pope John Paul II during his pontificate from 1978-2005. However, some of these acts do not possess a papal bull or formal decree of canonical coronation issued by the Holy See. As such, these instances are not counted and included in this list.)

== 18th century ==
Official title of the image	Date of coronation	Place of devotion	Authorization by	Marian image	Shrine of devotion
Black Madonna of Częstochowa	8 September 1717	Jasna Góra Monastery, Częstochowa	Pope Clement XI		
Matki Bożej Kodeńskiej	15 August 1723	Basilica of Saint Anne—Shrine of Our Lady of Kodeń	Pope Innocent XIII		
Matki Bożej Sokalskiej	8 September 1724	Church of Our Lady of Consolation, Sokal (former location, before 1951) Shrine of Our Lady of Sokal—Parish of Saint Stanislaus Kostka, Hrubieszów (current)	Pope Innocent XIII		Former church, in ruins Present location
Matki Bożej Podkamieńskiej	15 August 1727	Monastery of the Holy Cross, Pidkamin (former, before World War II) Church of Saint Adalbert, Wrocław (current)	Pope Benedict XIII		Former shrine, now in Ukraine Present shrine
Matki Bożej Zwycięskiej	1 July 1751	Dominican Church, Lviv (former, before 1946) Basilica of St. Nicholas, Gdańsk (present)	Pope Benedict XIV		Former Present
Matki Bożej Łąkowskiej	4 June 1752	Franciscan Monastery of Łąki Bratiańskie (extinct former shrine, before 1882) Basilica of Saint Thomas the Apostle—Shrine of Our Lady of Łąków, Nowe Miasto Lubawskie (current)	Pope Benedict XIV		Former shrine, in ruins Present
Matki Bożej Pocieszenia	8 September 1752	Basilica of the Assumption, Bernardine Monastery, Leżajsk	Pope Benedict XIV		
Matki Bożej Bolesnej	22 May 1754	Church of the Assumption, Chełmno	Pope Benedict XIV		
Matki Bożej Skępskiej	18 May 1755	Church of the Annunciation—Shrine of Our Lady of Skępe, Bernardine Monastery of Skępe	Pope Benedict XIV		
Matki Bożej Bolesnej	8 September 1755	Basilica Shrine of Our Lady of Sorrows, Dominican Monastery of Jarosław	Pope Benedict XIV		
Matki Bożej Rzeszowskiej	8 September 1763	Basilica of the Assumption—Shrine of Our Lady of Rzeszów, Bernardine Monastery of Rzeszów	Pope Benedict XIV		
Matki Bożej Chełmskiej	15 September 1765	Basilica of the Birth of the Virgin Mary, Chełm (Note: The original icon is currently in the Museum of Volyn Icon in Lutsk, Ukraine. Since 1919, a faithful copy of the icon is venerated in the basilica.)	Pope Clement XIII		
Matka Boża Jackowa	15 August 1766	Przemyśl Cathedral	Pope Clement XIII		
Święta Rodzina	7 June 1767	Shrine of Our Lady of the Holy Family—Parish of the Visitation, Miedniewice	Pope Clement XIII		
Matki Bożej Łaskawej	12 May 1776	Cathedral Basilica of the Assumption, Lviv (former, before 1946) Wawel Cathedral, Kraków (current) (Note: The image was previously located at the Cathedral Basilica of the Assumption, Lviv and has been transferred to Poland by Archbishop Eugeniusz Baziak since 1946, and was first placed in the Lubaczów Cathedral in 1974. In 1980, the image has been restored and is presently kept in the treasury of Wawel Cathedral in Kraków. 2 copies of the image were then made for the Lubaczów Cocathedral, and for its home in the Lviv Latin Cathedral, both were canonically crowned by Pope John Paul II.)	Pope Clement XIII		Former shrine Present shrine
Matki Bożej Niepokalanej	8 September 1777	Parish of Saint Mary Magdalene and Our Lady Immaculate, Przemyśl	Pope Clement XIII		
Matki Bożej Latyczowskiej	4 October 1778	Church of the Assumption, Dominican Monastery of Letychiv (former location, before 1920) Shrine of Our Lady of Latyczów, Patroness of the New Evangelization—Parish of Our Lady of the Rosary, Lublin (current)	Pope Pius VI		Former shrine Present shrine
The Holy Family	15 May 1796 29 September 1985	Collegiate Basilica of the Assumption—Shrine of Saint Joseph. Kalisz	Pope Pius VI Pope John Paul II		

== 19th century ==
Official title of the image	Date of coronation	Place of devotion	Authorization by	Marian image	Shrine of devotion
Matki Bożej Starowiejskiej	8 September 1877	Basilica of the Assumption, Stara Wieś, Podkarpackie Voivodeship	Pope Pius IX		
Matki Bożej Słuchającej	15 August 1882	Basilica of the Holy Cross—Shrine of the Passion of the Lord and Our Lady of Calvary, Franciscan Monastery of Kalwaria Pacławska	Pope Leo XIII		
Matki Bożej Piaskowej	7 May 1764 (Note: The date the original papal decree for the coronation of the image was issued by Pope Clement XIII, it did not take place for a few reasons such as not having enough funds for the crown of the Virgin, etc.) 8 September 1883	Basilica of the Visitation—Shrine of Our Lady of the Sands, Kraków	Pope Clement XIII Pope Leo XIII		
Our Lady of Calvary	15 August 1887	Basilica of Our Lady of the Angels—Marian Shrine of the Passion Kalwaria Zebrzydowska	Pope Leo XIII		

== 20th century ==
Official title of the image	Date of coronation	Place of devotion	Authorization by	Marian image	Shrine of devotion
Matki Bożej Dzikowskiej	8 September 1904	Shrine of Our Lady of Dzików—Parish of the Assumption, Dominican Monastery of Tarnobrzeg	Pope Pius X		
Matki Bożej Tuchowskiej	2 October 1904	Basilica of the Visitation and Saint Stanislaus, Redemptorist Monastery of Tuchów	Pope Pius X		
Matki Bożej Pocieszenia	28 May 1905	Jesuit Church of Saints Peter and Paul, Lviv (former, before 1946) Parish Church of Saint Clement Mary Hofbauer, Wrocław (present shrine)	Pope Pius X		Former shrine Present shrine
Matki Bożej Bolesnej	20 September 1908	Church of St. Francis of Assisi, Kraków	Pope Pius X		
Matki Bożej Niepokalanej	8 September 1909	Shrine of the Immaculate Mother of Good Hope—Parish of Saint Nicholas, Tuligłowy, Podkarpackie Voivodeship	Pope Pius X		
Święta Anna Samotrzecia	14 September 1910	Basilica Shrine of Saint Anne, Góra Świętej Anny	Pope Pius X		
Matki Bożej Kochawinskiej	15 August 1912	Carmelite Monastery of Saint Gerard, Hnizdychiv (former location) Parish of Our Lady of Kochawina, Gliwice (current shrine since 1994)	Pope Pius X		Former Present
Matki Bożej Bolesnej	8 September 1913	Shrine of Our Lady of Sorrows Misericordia Domini—Parish of the Nativity of the Blessed Virgin Mary, Sulisławice, Świętokrzyskie Voivodeship	Pope Pius X		
Matki Bożej Boreckiej	15 August 1919	Church of the Assumption, Borek Stary	Pope Benedict XV		
Matki Bożej Zawadzkiej	8 September 1920	Parish of the Nativity of the Blessed Virgin Mary, Zawada, Podkarpackie Voivodeship	Pope Benedict XV		
Matki Bożej Rudeckiej (original icon stolen in 1992)	8 September 1921	Sanctuary of Our Lady of Rudky—Parish Church of the Assumption, Rudky (former location) Sanctuary of Our Lady of Rudky—Queen of the Bieszczady Mountains, Ustrzyki Dolne (present shrine since 1968)	Pope Benedict XV		Former Present
Matki Bożej Różańcowej	2 October 1921	Basilica of the Holy Trinity, Kraków	Pope Benedict XV		
Matki Bożej Gidelskiej	19 August 1923	Basilica of the Assumption, Gidle	Pope Pius XI		
Matki Bożej Bolesnej	21 September 1924	Church of Saint Adalbert, Benedictine Abbey of Staniątki	Pope Pius X (Note: The decree was issued on 21 July 1913. The preparations however, was interrupted due to World War I and the coronation would not take place until 1924 during Pope Pius XI's pontificate.)		
Matki Bożej Piekarskiej	15 August 1925	Basilica of St. Mary and St. Bartholomew, Piekary Śląskie	Pope Pius XI		
Matki Bożej Przeczyckiej	15 August 1925	Parish of the Assumption, Przeczyca	Pope Pius XI		
Matki Bożej Tarnowieckiej	8 September 1925	Shrine of Our Lady of Entrustment—Parish of the Nativity of the Blessed Virgin Mary, Tarnowiec, Podkarpackie Voivodeship	Pope Pius XI		
Matki Bożej Świętogórskiej	24 June 1928	Basilica on the Holy Mountain, Głogówko	Pope Pius XI		
Matki Bożej Różańcowej	6 October 1929	Orthodox Church of Saint Josaphat Kuntsevych, Dominican Monastery of Zhovkva (Former location) Shrine of the Queen of the Holy Rosary, Dominican Monastery of Służew (current)	Pope Pius XI		Former shrine, now an Orthodox church Present shrine
Matki Bożej Pocieszenia	2 July 1931	Shrine Parish of Our Lady of Consolation, Borek Wielkopolski	Pope Pius XI		
Matki Bożej Raciborskiej	27 August 1932	Shrine Parish of Our Lady of Racibórz	Pope Pius XI		
Matki Bożej Łaskawej	8 September 1932	Parish of the Nativity of the Blessed Virgin Mary, Hyżne	Pope Pius XI		
Matki Bożej Różańcowej	7 October 1934	Basilica of Saint Nicholas—Shrine of Our Lady of the Rosary, Bochnia	Pope Pius XI		
Matki Bożej Łaskawej	30 May 1937	Armenian Catholic Church of the Immaculate Conception, (Note: Now the Orthodox Cathedral of the Protection of the Mother of God since 1991.) Stanyslaviv (former, before 1946) Church of Saints Peter and Paul in Gdańsk (current)	Pope Pius XI		Former shrine, now an Orthodox cathedral Present shrine
Matki Bożej Odporyszowskiej	15 August 1937	Marian Shrine and Church of the Purification, Odporyszów	Pope Pius XI		
Matki Bożej Swarzewskiej	8 September 1937	Shrine of Our Lady of Swarzewo, Queen of the Polish Sea—Parish of the Nativity of the Blessed Virgin Mary, Swarzewo	Pope Pius XI		
Matki Bożej Księżnej Sieradzkiej	8 September 1937	Shrine of Our Lady, Dutchess of Sieradz-Parish of the Nativity of the Blessed Virgin Mary, Charłupia Mała	Pope Pius XI		
Matki Bożej Jazłowieckiej	9 July 1939	Convent of the Sisters of the Immaculate Conception, Jazłowiec (Former location, before 1946) Shrine of Our Lady of Jazłowiec, Szymanów (current)	Pope Pius XII		Former Present
Matki Bożej Loretańskiej	7 September 1958	Sanctuary of Our Lady of Loreto, Piotrkowice, Kielce County	Pope Pius XII		
Matki Bożej Nieustającej Pomocy	11 October 1961	Collegiate Basilica of Our Mother of Perpetual Help and Saints Mary Magdalene and Stanislaus, Poznań	Pope John XXIII (Note: SACRA CONGREGATIO RITUUM: Prot. N. 33/961 — Posnaniensis, 12 aprilis 1961. Vatican Apostolic Archive.)		
Matki Bożej Okulickiej	9 September 1962	Parish of the Nativity of the Blessed Virgin Mary, Okulice, Lesser Poland Voivodeship	Pope John XXIII		
Matki Bożej Pocieszenia	10 August 1963	Parish of the Holy Spirit, Nowy Sącz	Pope John XXIII (Note: Pope John XXIII authorized the coronation of the icon through the Sacred Congregation of Rites in December 1962.)		
Matki Bożej Ludźmierskiej	15 August 1963	Sanctuary of Our Lady of Ludźmierz	Pope John XXIII (Note: The coronation was authorized by Pope John XXIII on 25 November 1962.)		
Matki Bożej Leśniańskiej	18 August 1963	Basiica of Saints Peter and Paul—Sanctuary of Our Lady, Mother of Unity and Faith, Leśna Podlaska	Pope John XXIII (Note: The coronation was authorized by Pope John XXIII on 25 November 1962.)		
Matki Bożej Świętojańskiej	9 May 1965	Church of Saints John the Baptist and John the Evangelist, Monastery of the Presentation Sisters of Kraków	Pope Paul VI		
Matki Bożej Góreckiej	6 June 1965	Basilica of the Immaculate Conception, Górka Klasztorna, Rataje, Piła County	Pope Paul VI		
Matki Bożej Markowickiej	27 June 1965	Basilica Shrine of Our Lady Queen of Love and Peace, Lady of Kujaw, Markowice, Kuyavian-Pomeranian Voivodeship	Pope Paul VI		
Matki Bożej Krasnobrodzkiej	4 July 1965	Parish of the Visitation, Krasnobród	Pope Paul VI		
Matki Bożej Rychwałdzkiej	18 July 1965	Basilica of Saint Nicholas—Shrine of Our Lady of Rychwałd	Pope Paul VI		
Matki Bożej Żegocińskiej	5 September 1965	Parish Church of the Assumption, Żegocin, Pleszew County	Pope Paul VI		
Matki Bożej Pięknej Miłości	29 May 1966 7 June 1999	Bydgoszcz Cathedral	Pope Paul VI Pope John Paul II (Note: Pope John Paul II, Congregation for Divine Worship and the Discipline of the Sacraments — Protocol Number: 2507/98/L, Archdiocese of Gniezno, 11 March 1999. Vatican Apostolic Archive.)		
Matki Bożej Bardzkiej	3 July 1966	Basilica of the Visitation of the Blessed Virgin Mary, Bardo	Pope Pius XII (Note: The coronation was allowed through a decree issued by the Vatican Chapter on 3 November 1948. However, due to ongoing political issues at that time, the coronation would be postponed until 1966, just in time for the millennium of the Christianity in Poland.)		
Matki Bożej Byszewskiej	10 July 1966	Shrine of Our Lady of Byszewo, Queen of Krajna—Parish of the Holy Trinity, Byszewo, Kuyavian-Pomeranian Voivodeship	Pope Paul VI		
Madonna Łokietkowa	17 July 1966	Collegiate Basilica of the Birth of the Blessed Virgin Mary, Wiślica	Pope Paul VI		
Matki Bożej Pocieszenia	28 August 1966	Parish Church of Our Lady of Consolation and Saint Michael the Archangel, Górka Duchowna	Pope Paul VI		
Matki Bożej Skalmierzyckiej	4 September 1966	Parish of Saint Catherine of Alexandria, Skalmierzyce, Greater Poland Voivodeship	Pope Paul VI		
Matki Bożej Sianowskiej	4 September 1966	Shrine of Our Lady, Queen of Kashubia, Sianów	Pope Paul VI		
Matki Bożej Bolesnej	11 September 1966	Basilica of Our Lady of Sorrows, Limanowa	Pope Paul VI		
Matki Bożej Leśniowskiej	13 August 1967	Sanctuary of Our Lady of Leśniow, Patroness of Families, Żarki	Pope Paul VI		
Our Lady of Sorrows, Queen of Poland	15 August 1967	Basilica of Our Lady of Licheń, Licheń Stary	Pope Paul VI		
Matki Bożej Łaskawej	3 September 1967	Sanctuary of Our Lady of Grace, Parish of Saint Nicholas, Pieranie	Pope Paul VI		
Our Lady of Gietrzwałd	10 September 1967	Basilica of the Nativity of the Blessed Virgin Mary, Gietrzwałd	Pope Paul VI		
Matki Bożej Nieustającej Pomocy	1 October 1967	Sanctuary of Our Lady of Perpetual Help—Parish of Saint Joseph, Toruń	Pope Paul VI		
Matki Bożej Anielskiej	19 May 1968	Basilica of Our Lady of the Angels, Dąbrowa Górnicza	Pope Paul VI		
Matki Bożej w Cudy Wielmożnej w Poznaniu	29 June 1968	Franciscan Monastery and Church of Saint Anthony of Padua, Poznań	Pope Paul VI (Note: SACRA CONGREGATIO RITUUM: Prot. N. 42/967 — Posnaniensis, 13 februarii 1968. Vatican Apostolic Archive.)		
Matki Bożej Świętolipskiej	11 August 1968	Basilica of the Visitation of the Blessed Virgin Mary, Święta Lipka	Pope Paul VI		
Matki Bożej Świętorodzinnej	18 August 1968	Basilica of Saints Philip Neri and John the Baptist, Studzianna, Łódź Voivodeship	Pope Paul VI		
Matki Bożej Turskiej	1 September 1968	Parish Church of Saint Andrew, Tursko, Greater Poland Voivodeship	Pope Paul VI		
Matki Bożej Królowej Nieba	8 September 1968	Shrine of the Queen of Pomerania and Mother of Unity—Parish of the Nativity of the Blessed Virgin Mary, Piaseczno, Tczew County	Pope Paul VI (Note: SACRA CONGREGATIO RITUUM: Prot. N. 138/967 — Culmensis, 21 novembris 1967. Vatican Apostolic Archive.)		
Matki Bożej Miłosierdzia	8 September 1968	Church of the Nativity of Mary, Piekoszów	Pope Paul VI		
Matki Bożej Różańcowej	12 October 1968	Church of the Sacred Heart of Jesus and Our Lady of Consolation, Poznań	Pope Paul VI (Note: SACRA CONGREGATIO RITUUM: Prot. N. 32/965 — Posnaniensis, 23 novembris 1965. Vatican Apostolic Archive.)		
Matki Bożej Częstochowskiej	15 December 1968	Church of the Assumption of the Blessed Virgin Mary, Kraków	Pope Paul VI		
Matki Bożej Pocieszenia	15 June 1969	Shrine of Our Lady of Consolation—Parish of the Assumption, Dąbrówka Kościelna	Pope Paul VI		
Matki Bożej Lipskiej	2 July 1969	Parish of the Visitation of the Blessed Virgin Mary and Saint Anne, Lubawa	Pope Paul VI		
Matki Bożej Myślenickiej	24 August 1969	Church of the Nativity of the Blessed Virgin Mary—Sanctuary of Our Lady of Myślenice	Pope Paul VI		
Matki Bożej Pocieszenia	23 August 1970	Shrine of Our Lady of Consolation—Parish of Saint Andrew the Apostle, Golina	Pope Paul VI		
Matki Bożej Pocieszenia	6 September 1970	Basilica of the Annunciation, Czerwińsk nad Wisłą	Pope Paul VI (Note: SACRA CONGREGATIO RITUUM: Prot. N. 4/968 — Plocensis, 2 februarii 1968. Vatican Apostolic Archive.)		
Matki Bożej Pocieszenia	20 September 1970	Collegiate Basilica Shrine of Our Lady of Consolation and Saint Stanislaus, Szamotuły	Pope Paul VI (Note: Sacra Congregatio pro Sacramentis et Cultu Divino: Prot. n. 1824/69, Archdiocese of Poznań, 3 December 1969. Vatican Apostolic Archive.)		
Matki Bożej Pocieszenia	5 September 1971	Collegiate Church of Corpus Christi—Sanctuary of Our Lady of Consolation, Wieluń	Pope Paul VI		
Matki Bożej Lutyńskiej	13 August 1972	Parish of the Assumption, Lutynia, Pleszew County	Pope Paul VI		
Matki Bożej Smardzowickiej	27 August 1972	Parish Church of Our Lady of the Rosary and Saint Margaret, Smardzowice	Pope Paul VI		
Matki Bożej Rywałdzkiej	3 September 1972	Marian Shrine and Capuchin Monastery of Rywałd	Pope Paul VI		
Our Lady of Graces	7 October 1973	Jesuit Church, Warsaw	Pope Paul VI		
Matki Bożej Wysokolskiej	18 August 1974	Church of Our Lady, Queen of the Holy Rosary, Wysokie Koło	Pope Paul VI		
Matki Bożej Pocieszenia	1 September 1974	Shrine Parish of Our Lady of Consolation, Kawnice	Pope Pius XII (Note: The coronation was authorized by Pope Pius XII through the Vatican Chapter in 1954.)		
Matki Bożej Lewiczynskiej	10 August 1975	Shrine of Our Lady of Lewiczyn, Comforter of the Afflicted—Parish of Saints Adalbert and Martin, Lewiczyn, Grójec County	Pope Paul VI (Note: Sacra Congregatio pro Sacramentis et Cultu Divino: Prot. n. 2137/74, Archdiocese of Warsaw, 7 October 1974. Vatican Apostolic Archive.)		
Matki Bożej Pocieszenia	31 August 1975	Shrine Parish of Our Lady of Consolation, Jodłówka	Pope Paul VI		
Matki Bożej Sejneńskiej	7 September 1975	Minor Basilica of the Visitation of Mary, Sejny, Lomza	Pope Paul VI (Note: Sacra Congregatio pro Sacramentis et Cultu Divino: Prot. n. 1681/72, Diocese of Łomża, 3 February 1973. Vatican Apostolic Archive.)		
Matki Bożej Głogowieckiej	14 September 1975	Marian Shrine and Parish of Saint Adalbert, Głogowiec, Łódź East County	Pope Paul VI (Note: Sacra Congregatio pro Sacramentis et Cultu Divino: Prot. n. 2139/74, Archdiocese of Warsaw, 7 October 1974. Vatican Apostolic Archive.)		
Matki Bożej Bolesnej	18 July 1976	Shrine Parish of Our Lady of Sorrows, Obory, Golub-Dobrzyń County	Pope Paul VI (Note: Sacra Congregatio pro Sacramentis et Cultu Divino: Prot. n. 1988/74, Diocese of Płock, 7 October 1974. Vatican Apostolic Archive.)		
Matki Bożej Pocieszenia	12 September 1976	Shrine of Our Lady of Consolation—Parish of the Nativity of the Blessed Virgin Mary, Biechowo	Pope Paul VI (Note: Sacra Congregatio pro Sacramentis et Cultu Divino: Prot. n. 2140/74, Archdiocese of Gniezno, 7 October 1974. Vatican Apostolic Archive.)		
Matki Bożej Pocieszenia	21 August 1977	Shrine of Our Lady of Consolation—Parish of the Nativity, Stara Błotnica, Sandomierz	Pope Paul VI (Note: Sacra Congregatio pro Sacramentis et Cultu Divino: Prot. n. 1740/73, Diocese of Sandomierz, 4 December 1973. Vatican Apostolic Archive.)		
Matki Bożej Przasnyskiej	18 September 1977	Shrine of Our Mother of the Immaculate Guide—Parish of Saint Stanislaus Kostka, Przasnysz	Pope Paul VI (Note: Sacra Congregatio pro Sacramentis et Cultu Divino: Prot. n. 294/74, Diocese of Płock, 11 May 1974. Vatican Apostolic Archive.)		
Matka Boska Kębelska	10 September 1978	Basilica of Saint Adalbert—Shrine of Our Lady of Kębło, Wąwolnica, Lublin Voivodeship	Pope Paul VI (Note: Sacra Congregatio pro Sacramentis et Cultu Divino: Prot. CD 770/75, Diocese of Lublin, 6 April 1976. Vatican Apostolic Archive.)		
Matki Bożej Makowskiej	10 June 1979	Shrine of Our Lady, Protector and Queen of Families—Parish of the Transfiguration, Maków Podhalański	Pope Paul VI (Note: Sacra Congregatio pro Sacramentis et Cultu Divino: Prot. CD 470/78, Archdiocese of Kraków, 30 March 1978. Vatican Apostolic Archive.)		
Matki Bożej Bolesnej	5 August 1979	Shrine of Our Lady of Sorrows—Church of Saint Valentine, Franciscan Monastery of Osieczna	Pope Paul VI (Note: Sacra Congregatio pro Sacramentis et Cultu Divino: Prot. CD 750/75, Archdiocese of Poznań, 2 April 1976. Vatican Apostolic Archive.)		
Matki Bożej Tuleckiej	2 September 1979	Marian Shrine and Parish of the Nativity of the Blessed Virgin Mary, Tulce	Pope Paul VI (Note: Sacra Congregatio pro Sacramentis et Cultu Divino: Prot. CD 796/76, Archdiocese of Poznań, 26 May 1976. Vatican Apostolic Archive.)		
Matki Bożej Lipińskiej	17 August 1980	Shrine Parish of the Assumption, Lipinki, Lesser Poland Voivodeship	Pope Paul VI (Note: Pope Paul VI authorized the coronation of the ancient statue in 1969, due to a fire leading to its destruction were not able to carry out the ceremony with a reconstruction of the image in 1980.)		
Matki Bożej Wambierzyckiej	17 August 1980	Basilica of the Visitation, Wambierzyce	Pope Paul VI (Note: Sacra Congregatio pro Sacramentis et Cultu Divino: Prot. CD 1347/77, Archdiocese of Wrocław, 28 October 1977. Vatican Apostolic Archive.)		
Matki Bożej Pojednania	31 August 1980	Shrine of Our Lady of Reconciliation—Parish of the Assumption, Hodyszewo	Pope Paul VI (Note: Sacra Congregatio pro Sacramentis et Cultu Divino: Prot. CD 1680/77, Diocese of Łomża, 24 November 1977. Vatican Apostolic Archive.)		
Matki Bożej Różanostockiej	28 June 1981	Basilica of the Presentation of the Blessed Virgin Mary, Różanystok	Pope John Paul I (Note: On 13 September 1978, Pope John Paul I issued the decree authorizing the coronation which would be the only such rite he ever granted during his pontificate. — Sacra Congregatio pro Sacramentis et Cultu Divino: Prot. CD 936/78, Archdiocese of Vilnius, 13 September 1978. Vatican Apostolic Archive.)		
Matki Bożej Gułowskiej	5 September 1982	Parish of the Visitation, Wola Gułowska	Pope John Paul II		
Matki Bożej Płockiej	12 September 1982	Shrine of Our Lady of Workers' Families—Parish of the Nativity of the Blessed Virgin Mary, Płoki	Pope John Paul II		
Matki Bożej Zwycięskiej	19 June 1983	Shrine of Our Lady of Victories—Parish of Saint Adalbert, Brdów	Pope John Paul II		
Our Lady of Graces of Lviv (Replica)	19 June 1983	Cocathedral of Blessed Jakub Strzemię—Shrine of Our Lady of Graces of Lviv, Lubaczów	Pope John Paul II (Note: Sacra Congregatio pro Sacramentis et Cultu Divino: Prot. CD 891/83, Archdiocese of Lviv of the Latins, 16 May 1983. Vatican Apostolic Archive.)		
Matki Pokoju	19 June 1983	Basilica of the Visitation, Monastery of Stoczek	Pope John Paul II		
Matki Bożej Śnieżnej	21 June 1983	Sanktuarium Maria Śnieżna, Mount Igliczna, Międzygórze	Pope John Paul II		
Matki Bożej Opolskiej	21 June 1983	Opole Cathedral	Pope John Paul II		
Matki Bożej Sierpeckiej	21 August 1983	Church of the Assumption—Parish of Saint Benedict, Benedictine Monastery of Sierpc	Pope John Paul II		
Matki Bożej Śnieżnej	19 August 1984	Szczyrzyc Abbey	Pope John Paul II		
Matki Bożej Łaskawej-Różańcowej "Mater Amabilis"	19 February 1985	Collegiate Church of Saint John the Baptist—Shrine of Our Lady of Graces-the Rosary, Dominican Monastery of Janów Lubelski	Pope John Paul II		
Matki Bożej Pani Kujaw	30 June 1985	Marian Shrine and Parish of the Nativity of the Blessed Virgin Mary, Ostrowąs	Pope John Paul II		
Matki Bożej Płonkowskiej	30 June 1985	Parish of Saint Michael the Archangel, Płonka Kościelna	Pope John Paul II		
Matki Bożej Pocieszenia	8 September 1985	Collegiate Church of the Nativity of the Blessed Virgin Mary, Krypno	Pope John Paul II		
Matki Bożej Kazimierskiej	31 August 1986	Church of the Annunciation, Monastery of Kazimierz Dolny	Pope John Paul II		
Matki Bożej Fatimskiej	11 June 1987	Shrine of Our Lady of Fatima, Szczecin	Pope John Paul II		
Matko Boża Trąbkowska	12 June 1987	Marian Shrine and Parish of the Assumption, Trąbki Wielkie	Pope John Paul II (Note: Pope John Paul II granted the coronation for the image through his papal bull "Iugi amore" issued on 2 February 1987 to His Excellency, Most Reverend Tadeusz Gocłowski, Bishop of Gdańsk.)		
Matki Bożej Ostrożańskiej	5 July 1987	Marian Shrine and Parish of the Nativity of the Blessed Virgin Mary, Ostrożany	Pope John Paul II		
Matki Bożej Fatimskiej	21 October 1987	National Shrine of Our Lady of Fatima, Zakopane - Krzeptówki	Pope John Paul II		
Matki Bożej Płaczącej	26 June 1988	Lublin Cathedral	Pope John Paul II		
Matki Bożej Szkaplerznej	17 July 1988	Monastery of Discalced Carmelites, Czerna, Lesser Poland Voivodeship	Pope John Paul II		
Matki Bożej Bolesnej	18 September 1988	Basilica of the Assumption—Shrine of Our Lady of Sorrows, Skrzatusz	Pope John Paul II		
Matki Bożej Cierpliwie Słuchającej	18 June 1989	Basilica Shrine of Our Lady, Patiently Listening, Rokitno, Międzyrzecz County	Pope John Paul II		
Matki Bożej Łysieckiej	3 September 1989	Armenian Catholic Church of the Holy Trinity, Gliwice	Pope John Paul II		
Matki Bożej Zwycięskiej	10 September 1989	Church of the Blessed Virgin Mary on the Sand, Wrocław	Pope John Paul II		
Matki Bożej Pocieszenia	2 September 1990	Diocesan Shrine of Our Lady of Consolation—Parish of Saint John the Merciful, Orchówek, Lublin Voivodeship	Pope John Paul II		
Matki Bożej Łaskawej	3 June 1991	Kielce Cathedral	Pope John Paul II (Note: Pope John Paul II, Congregation for Divine Worship and the Discipline of the Sacraments — Protocol Number: 745/90, Diocese of Kielce, 13 November 1990. Vatican Apostolic Archive.)		
Matki Bożej Tartakowskiej	3 June 1991	Sanctuary of Our Lady of Łukawiec	Pope John Paul II (Note: Pope John Paul II, Congregation for Divine Worship and the Discipline of the Sacraments — Protocol Number: 744/90, Archdiocese of Lviv of the Latins (Administration of Lubaczów), 5 December 1990. Vatican Apostolic Archive.)		
Matki Bożej Nieustającej Pomocy	7 June 1991	Shrine of Our Mother of Perpetual Help within the Discalced Carmelite Monastery of Niedźwiady	Pope John Paul II (Note: Pope John Paul II, Congregation for Divine Worship and the Discipline of the Sacraments — Protocol Number: 791/90, Diocese of Włocławek, 5 December 1990. Vatican Apostolic Archive.)		
Matki Bożej Fatimskiej	14 August 1991	Parish of Saint Peter the Apostle, Wadowice	Pope John Paul II		
Matki Bożej Mirowskiej	14 June 1992	Shrine of Our Lady of Mirów—Parish of the Visitation, Franciscan Monastery of Pińczów	Pope John Paul II		
Matki Bożej Fatimskiej	13 September 1992	Parish of Our Lady, Queen of Poland, Bieńczyce, Kraków	Pope John Paul II		
Matki Bożej Pocieszenia	28 August 1993	Shrine of Our Lady of Consolation, Pasierbiec	Pope John Paul II		
Matki Bożej Bolesnej	26 September 1993	Basilica of the Visitation—Shrine of Our Lady of Sorrows, Hałcnów	Pope John Paul II		
Matki Bożej Nieustającej Pomocy	26 June 1994	Parish of Our Mother of Perpetual Help, Podgórze, Kraków	Pope John Paul II		
Matki Bożej Szkaplerznej	17 July 1994	Parish of the Annunciation, Tomaszów Lubelski	Pope John Paul II		
Matki Bożej Łaskawej	11 September 1994	Church of Saint Charles Borromeo, Wrocław	Pope John Paul II		
Matki Bożej Łaskawej	4 June 1995	Church of the Stigmatization of Saint Francis, Franciscan Monastery of Wieliczka	Pope John Paul II		
Matki Bożej Ostrobramskiej, Matki Miłosierdzia	5 June 1995	Białystok Cathedral	Pope John Paul II		
Matki Bożej Studzieniczańskiej	17 September 1995	Chapel of Virgin Mary, Studzieniczna, Augustów	Pope John Paul II (Note: Pope John Paul II, Congregation for Divine Worship and the Discipline of the Sacraments — Protocol Number: 2271/94/L, Diocese of Ełk, 31 January 1995. Vatican Apostolic Archive.)		
Matki Bożej Wspomożenia Wiernych	24 September 1995	Basilica of Mary Help of Christians, Twardogóra	Pope John Paul II		
Matki Bożej Brama Miłosierdzia	18 August 1996	Greek Catholic Church of the Transfiguration, Jarosław	Pope John Paul II		
Matki Bożej Wniebowziętej-Różańcowej	25 August 1996	Shrine of Our Lady of Mrzygłód—Parish of Our Lady of the Rosary, Myszków	Pope John Paul II		
Matki Bożej Saletyńskiej	15 September 1996	Basilica of Our Lady of La Salette, Dębowiec	Pope John Paul II (Note: Pope John Paul II, Congregation for Divine Worship and the Discipline of the Sacraments — Protocol Number: 2222/94/L, Diocese of Rzeszów, 16 January 1995. Vatican Apostolic Archive.)		
Matki Bożej Adorującej	31 May 1997	Wrocław Cathedral	Pope John Paul II		
Matki Bożej Łaskawej	2 June 1997	Basilica of the Assumption of the Blessed Virgin Mary, Krzeszów	Pope John Paul II		
Matki Bożej Pocieszenia	3 June 1997	Parish of the Assumption, Franciscan Church and monastery, Gniezno	Pope John Paul II		
Matki Bożej Bolesnej	3 June 1997	Shrine of Our Lady of Sorrows—Parish of the Nativity of the Blessed Virgin Mary, Skulsk	Pope John Paul II		
Matki Bożej Pocieszycielki Strapionych	22 June 1997	Diocesan Shrine of Our Lady, Comforter of the Afflicted—Parish of the Annunciation, Miedzna	Pope John Paul II		
Matki Bożej Pocieszenia	31 August 1997	Diocesan Shrine of Our Lady of Consolation—Parish of the Holy Trinity, Lubiszewo Tczewskie	Pope John Paul II		
Matki Bożej Fatimskiej	13 September 1997	Basilica of the Sacred Heart of Jesus—Shrine of Our Lady of Fatima, Trzebinia	Pope John Paul II		
Matki Bożej Królowej Rodzin	16 May 1998	Marian Shrine and Parish of the Holy Trinity, Kościerzyna	Pope John Paul II		
Matki Bożej Tęskniącej	28 June 1998	Parish of Saint Elizabeth, Powsin, Warsaw	Pope John Paul II		
Matki Bożej Niezawodnej Nadziei	3 July 1998	Dominican Church of Our Lady of Unfailing Hope, Jamna, Lesser Poland Voivodeship	Pope John Paul II		
Matki Bożej Staroskrzyńskiej	6 September 1998	Parish of Saint Adalbert, Skrzyńsko	Pope John Paul II		
Matki Bożej Wejherowskiej	5 June 1999	Archdiocesan Passion-Marian Shrine—Parish of Our Lady, Health of the Sick and Saint Anne, Wejherowo	Pope John Paul II (Note: Pope John Paul II, Congregation for Divine Worship and the Discipline of the Sacraments — Protocol Number: 2123/98/L, Archdiocese of Gdańsk, 17 March 1999. Vatican Apostolic Archive.)		
Matki Zbawiciela	13 June 1999	Church of the Holiest Saviour, Warsaw	Pope John Paul II (Note: Pope John Paul II, Congregation for Divine Worship and the Discipline of the Sacraments — Protocol Number: 92/99/L, Archdiocese of Warsaw, 21 January 1999. Vatican Apostolic Archive.)		
Matki Bożej Nieustającej Pomocy	16 June 1999	Basilica of the Presentation of the Blessed Virgin Mary, Wadowice	Pope John Paul II (Note: Pope John Paul II, Congregation for Divine Worship and the Discipline of the Sacraments — Protocol Number: 386/99/L, Archdiocese of Kraków, 19 February 1999. Vatican Apostolic Archive.)		
Matki Bożej Wychowawczyni	5 September 1999	Shrine Parish of Our Lady the Educator, Czarna, Końskie County	Pope John Paul II		
Matki Bożej Pocieszycielki Strapionych	8 September 1999	Shrine of Our Lady, Comforter of the Afflicted, Domaniewice	Pope John Paul II (Note: Pope John Paul II, Congregation for Divine Worship and the Discipline of the Sacraments — Protocol Number: 1867/99/L, Diocese of Łowicz, 30 August 1999. Vatican Apostolic Archive.)		
Matki Bożej Bolesnej	12 September 1999	Diocesan Shrine of Our Lady of Sorrows—Parish of Saint Martin, Czarny Potok, Lesser Poland Voivodeship	Pope John Paul II (Note: Pope John Paul II, Congregation for Divine Worship and the Discipline of the Sacraments — Protocol Number: 2051/99/L, Diocese of Tarnów, 9 September 1999. Vatican Apostolic Archive.)		
Matki Bożej Boguckiej	4 June 2000	Basilica of Saint Stephen—Shrine of Our Lady of Bogucice, Katowice	Pope John Paul II (Note: Pope John Paul II, Congregation for Divine Worship and the Discipline of the Sacraments — Protocol Number: 2787/99/L, Archdiocese of Katowice, 22 December 1999. Vatican Apostolic Archive.)		
Matki Bożej Pokornej	4 June 2000	Basilica of the Assumption—Diocesan Shrine of Our Lady of Humbleness, Rudy, Silesian Voivodeship	Pope John Paul II (Note: Pope John Paul II, Congregation for Divine Worship and the Discipline of the Sacraments — Protocol Number: 163/00/L, Diocese of Gliwice, 17 February 2000. Vatican Apostolic Archive.)		
Matki Bożej Miłosiernej	12 June 2000	Parish of Saint Adalbert, Biała Rawska	Pope John Paul II (Note: Pope John Paul II, Congregation for Divine Worship and the Discipline of the Sacraments — Protocol Number: 2899/99/L, Diocese of Łowicz, 19 January 2000. Vatican Apostolic Archive.)		
Matki Bożej Wąsewskiej	8 September 2000	Parish of the Nativity of the Blessed Virgin Mary, Wąsewo, Masovian Voivodeship	Pope John Paul II (Note: Pope John Paul II, Congregation for Divine Worship and the Discipline of the Sacraments — Protocol Number: 2132/99/L, Diocese of Łomża, 18 November 1999. Vatican Apostolic Archive.)		
Matki Bożej Łaskawej-Odwachowskiej	9 September 2000	Zamość Cathedral	Pope John Paul II (Note: Pope John Paul II, Congregation for Divine Worship and the Discipline of the Sacraments — Protocol Number: 202/00/L, Diocese of Zamość-Lubaczów, 17 February 2000. Vatican Apostolic Archive.)		
Matki Bożej Żuromińskiej	10 September 2000	Marian Shrine and Parish of Saint Anthony of Padua, Żuromin	Pope John Paul II (Note: Pope John Paul II, Congregation for Divine Worship and the Discipline of the Sacraments — Protocol Number: 2491/99/L, Diocese of Płock, 2 December 1999. Vatican Apostolic Archive.)		
Matki Bożej Pocieszenia	9 December 2000	Church of Saint Catherine, Kraków	Pope John Paul II (Note: Pope John Paul II, Congregation for Divine Worship and the Discipline of the Sacraments — Protocol Number: 1557/00/L, Archdiocese of Kraków, 26 July 2000. Vatican Apostolic Archive.)		

== 21st century ==
Official title of the image	Date of coronation	Place of devotion	Authorization by	Marian image	Shrine of devotion
Matka Boża z Gruszką	6 May 2001	Collegiate Basilica of Saint John the Baptist—Shrine of Our Lady, Queen of Families, Parczew	Pope John Paul II (Note: Pope John Paul II, Congregation for Divine Worship and the Discipline of the Sacraments — Protocol Number: 980/00/L, Diocese of Siedlce, 19 May 2000. Vatican Apostolic Archive.)		
Matki Bożej Pszówskiej	8 September 2002	Basilica of the Nativity of the Blessed Virgin Mary—Sanktuarium Matki Bożej Uśmiechniętej, Pszów	Pope John Paul II (Note: Pope John Paul II, Congregation for Divine Worship and the Discipline of the Sacraments — Protocol Number: 462/02/L, Archdiocese of Katowice, 14 March 2002. Vatican Apostolic Archive.)		
Matki Bożej Pocieszenia	12 September 2002	Church of Saint Stephen, Kraków	Pope John Paul II (Note: Pope John Paul II, Congregation for Divine Worship and the Discipline of the Sacraments — Protocol Number: 996/02/L, Archdiocese of Kraków, 1 July 2002. Vatican Apostolic Archive.)		
Matki Bożej Łowickiej	5 October 2002	Łowicz Cathedral	Pope John Paul II (Note: Pope John Paul II, Congregation for Divine Worship and the Discipline of the Sacraments — Protocol Number: 1816/01/L, Diocese of Łowicz, 10 November 2001. Vatican Apostolic Archive.)		
Matki Bożej Fatimskiej	13 June 2004	Archdiocesan Shrine and Parish of Our Lady of Fatima, Turza Śląska	Pope John Paul II (Note: Pope John Paul II, Congregation for Divine Worship and the Discipline of the Sacraments — Protocol Number: 984/03/L, Archdiocese of Katowice, 21 May 2003. Vatican Apostolic Archive.)		
Matki Bożej Pajęczańskiej	28 May 2005	Eucharistic Shrine—Parish of the Assumption and Saint Leonard, Pajęczno	Pope John Paul II (Note: Pope John Paul II, Congregation for Divine Worship and the Discipline of the Sacraments — Protocol Number: 2439/03/L, Archdiocese of Częstochowa, 8 December 2003. Vatican Apostolic Archive.)		
Matki Bożej Ostrobramskiej, Matki Miłosierdzia	2 July 2005	Basilica Shrine of Our Lady of the Gate of Dawn, Skarżysko-Kamienna	Pope John Paul II (Note: Pope John Paul II, Congregation for Divine Worship and the Discipline of the Sacraments — Protocol Number: 2103/03/L, Diocese of Radom, 18 November 2003. Vatican Apostolic Archive.)		
Matki Bożej Ucieczki Grzeszników	3 July 2005	Shrine of Our Lady, Refuge of Sinners, Wieleń Zaobrzański	Pope John Paul II (Note: The decree was granted by Pope John Paul II through the Congregation for Divine Worship and the Discipline of the Sacraments, on August 17, 2004, for the Archdiocese of Poznań. Though, the said decree was not recorded in the Summarium Decretorum for July-December 2004. Vatican Apostolic Archive.)		
Matki Bożej Łaskiej	25 September 2005	Collegiate Parish Church of the Immaculate Conception and Saint Michael the Archangel, Łask	Pope John Paul II (Note: Pope John Paul II, Congregation for Divine Worship and the Discipline of the Sacraments — Protocol Number: 946/04/L, Archdiocese of Łódź, 8 July 2004. Vatican Apostolic Archive.)		
Matki Bożej Trybunalskiej	26 May 2006	Church of Saint Francis Xavier—Shrine of Our Lady of Piotrków Trybunalski	Pope Benedict XVI (Note: Pope Benedict XVI, Congregation for Divine Worship and the Discipline of the Sacraments — Protocol Number: 1123/05/L, Archdiocese of Łódź, 12 October 2005. Vatican Apostolic Archive.)		
Matki Bożej Włoszczowskiej	3 June 2007	Parish of the Assumption, Wloszczowa	Pope Benedict XVI (Note: Pope Benedict XVI, Congregation for Divine Worship and the Discipline of the Sacraments — Protocol Number: 1492/06/L, Diocese of Kielce, 7 March 2007. Vatican Apostolic Archive.)		
Matki Bożej Bolesnej	15 August 2007	Shrine of Our Lady of Sorrows, Queen of Poland—Parish of Saint Maximilian Kolbe, Kałków, Świętokrzyskie Voivodeship	Pope Benedict XVI (Note: Pope Benedict XVI, Congregation for Divine Worship and the Discipline of the Sacraments — Protocol Number: 137/07/L, Diocese of Radom, 5 February 2007. Vatican Apostolic Archive.)		
Matki Bożej Pocieszenia	8 September 2007	Parish of the Descent of the Holy Spirit, Bęczkowice	Pope Benedict XVI (Note: Pope Benedict XVI, Congregation for Divine Worship and the Discipline of the Sacraments — Protocol Number: 1373/06/L, Archdiocese of Częstochowa, 16 November 2006. Vatican Apostolic Archive.)		
Matki Bożej Szczyrkowskiej	21 September 2008	Shrine of Our Lady, Queen of Poland, Szczyrk	Pope Benedict XVI (Note: Pope Benedict XVI, Congregation for Divine Worship and the Discipline of the Sacraments — Protocol Number: 1217/06/L, Diocese of Bielsko–Żywiec, 31 January 2007. Vatican Apostolic Archive.)		
Matki Bożej Jasnogórskiej	1 June 2009	Parish of Saint Barbara, Będzin	Pope Benedict XVI (Note: Pope Benedict XVI, Congregation for Divine Worship and the Discipline of the Sacraments — Protocol Number: 1020/08/L, Diocese of Sosnowiec, 25 October 2008. Vatican Apostolic Archive.)		
Matki Bożej Trudnego Zawierzenia	9 October 2010	Parish of the Holy Trinity, Jordanów	Pope Benedict XVI (Note: Pope Benedict XVI, Congregation for Divine Worship and the Discipline of the Sacraments — Protocol Number: 668/10/L, Archdiocese of Kraków, 8 September 2010. Vatican Apostolic Archive.)		
Matki Bożej Loretańskiej	2 July 2011	Franciscan Church and Monastery of Głogówek	Pope Benedict XVI (Note: Pope Benedict XVI, Congregation for Divine Worship and the Discipline of the Sacraments — Protocol Number: 210/10/L, Diocese of Opole, 9 November 2010. Vatican Apostolic Archive.)		
Matki Bożej Pólkowskiej	7 September 2013	Marian Shrine and Church of the Nativity of the Blessed Virgin Mary, Bralin	Pope Francis (Note: Pope Francis, Congregation for Divine Worship and the Discipline of the Sacraments — Protocol Number: 268/13/L, Diocese of Kalisz, 11 June 2013. Vatican Apostolic Archive.)		
Matki Bożej Nieustającej Pomocy	22 June 2014	Shrine of Our Mother of Perpetual Help—Parish of the Exaltation of the Holy Cross, Gliwice	Pope Francis (Note: Pope Francis, Congregation for Divine Worship and the Discipline of the Sacraments — Protocol Number: 12/14/L, Diocese of Gliwice, 22 January 2014. Vatican Apostolic Archive.)		
Matki Bożej Uzdrowienie Chorych	15 August 2014	Parish of the Assumption, Suserz	Pope Francis (Note: Pope Francis, Congregation for Divine Worship and the Discipline of the Sacraments — Protocol Number: 213/14/L, Diocese of Łowicz, 12 May 2014. Vatican Apostolic Archive.)		
Matki Bożej Popowskiej	23 August 2015	Diocesan Shrine of Our Lady of Popowo, Mother of Hope—Parish of the Nativity of the Blessed Virgin Mary, Popowo Kościelne, Greater Poland Voivodeship	Pope Francis (Note: Pope Francis, Congregation for Divine Worship and the Discipline of the Sacraments — Protocol Number: 282/15, Diocese of Płock, 1 July 2015. Vatican Apostolic Archive.)		
Kalwaryjskiej Matki Zawierzenia	12 September 2015	Parish of the Holy Family, Praszka	Pope Francis (Note: Pope Francis, Congregation for Divine Worship and the Discipline of the Sacraments — Protocol Number: 593/14, Archdiocese of Częstochowa, 30 June 2015. Vatican Apostolic Archive.)		
Matki Bożej Uzdrowienie Chorych	13 May 2017	Świdnica Cathedral	Pope Francis (Note: Pope Francis, Congregation for Divine Worship and the Discipline of the Sacraments — Protocol Number: 516/16, Diocese of Świdnica, 15 February 2018. Vatican Apostolic Archive.)		
Matki Bożej Pocieszenia	28 May 2017	Calvary Shrine—Parish of Saint Nicholas, Wiele, Pomeranian Voivodeship	Pope Francis (Note: Pope Francis, Congregation for Divine Worship and the Discipline of the Sacraments — Protocol Number: 298/16, Diocese of Pelplin, 13 May 2017. Vatican Apostolic Archive.)		
Matki Bożej Fatimskiej	4 June 2017	Parish of Saint Joseph and Our Lady of Fatima, Tarnów	Pope Francis (Note: Pope Francis, Congregation for Divine Worship and the Discipline of the Sacraments — Protocol Number: 222/17, Diocese of Tarnów, 13 May 2017. Vatican Apostolic Archive.)		
Matki Bożej Pocieszenia	11 June 2017	Parish of Our Lady of Consolation, Kombornia	Pope Francis (Note: Pope Francis, Congregation for Divine Worship and the Discipline of the Sacraments — Protocol Number: 86/17, Archdiocese of Przemyśl, 13 May 2017. Vatican Apostolic Archive.)		
Matki Bożej Fatimskiej	11 June 2017	Shrine Parish of Saint Michael the Archangel, Miejsce Piastowe	Pope Francis (Note: Pope Francis, Congregation for Divine Worship and the Discipline of the Sacraments — Protocol Number: 87/17, Archdiocese of Przemyśl, 13 May 2017. Vatican Apostolic Archive.)		
Matki Bożej Królowej Rodzin	9 September 2017	Shrine of Our Lady, Queen of Families—Parish of All Saints, Chorzelów	Pope Francis (Note: Pope Francis, Congregation for Divine Worship and the Discipline of the Sacraments — Protocol Number: 221/17, Diocese of Tarnów, 13 May 2017. Vatican Apostolic Archive.)		
Matki Bożej Jasnogórskiej	13 October 2018	Basilica of Saint John the Baptist, Szczecin	Pope Francis (Note: Pope Francis, Congregation for Divine Worship and the Discipline of the Sacraments — Protocol Number: 232/18, Archdiocese of Szczecin-Kamień, 8 September 2018. Vatican Apostolic Archive.)		
Matki Bożej Smardzewskiej	15 August 2019	Marian Shrine and Parish of Saint Stanislaus Kostka, Smardzewo, Płońsk County	Pope Francis (Note: Pope Francis, Congregation for Divine Worship and the Discipline of the Sacraments — Protocol Number: 370/18, Diocese of Płock, 10 January 2019. Vatican Apostolic Archive.)		
Matki Bożej Szkaplerznej	17 July 2021	Parish of Saint Michael the Archangel, Daleszyce	Pope Francis (Note: Pope Francis, Congregation for Divine Worship and the Discipline of the Sacraments — Protocol Number: 76/20, Diocese of Kielce, 13 July 2020. Vatican Apostolic Archive.)		
Matki Bożej Pocieszenia	12 June 2022	Collegiate Basilica of the Blessed Virgin Mary, Queen of Poland, Gdynia	Pope Francis (Note: Pope Francis, Congregation for Divine Worship and the Discipline of the Sacraments — Protocol Number: 358/20, Archdiocese of Gdańsk, 4 August 2021. Vatican Apostolic Archive.)		
Matki Bożej Smolickiej	9 September 2023	Shrine of Our Lady, Health of the Sick—Parish of the Sacred Heart of Jesus, Smolice, Greater Poland Voivodeship	Pope Francis (Note: Pope Francis, Congregation for Divine Worship and the Discipline of the Sacraments — Protocol Number: 366/20, Archdiocese of Poznań, 7 October 2020. Vatican Apostolic Archive.)		
Matki Bożej Bolesnej	15 September 2024	Archdiocesan Shrine of Our Lady of Sorrows, Queen of Wielgomłyny—Parish of Saint Stanislaus, Wielgomłyny	Pope Francis (Note: Pope Francis, Dicastery for Divine Worship and the Discipline of the Sacraments — Protocol Number: 271/24, Archdiocese of Częstochowa, 22 July 2024. Vatican Apostolic Archive.)		
Matki Bożej Różańcowej	21 June 2025	Parish of Saint Matthias, Andrychów	Pope Francis (Note: Pope Francis, Dicastery for Divine Worship and the Discipline of the Sacraments — Protocol Number: 1/24, Diocese of Bielsko–Żywiec, 8 January 2024. Vatican Apostolic Archive.)		
Matki Bożej Fatimskiej	5 June 2027	Sanctuary of Our Lady of Fátima, Górki, Garwolin County	Pope Leo XIV		
