= Wąwolnica, Lublin Voivodeship =

Wąwolnica
- Town
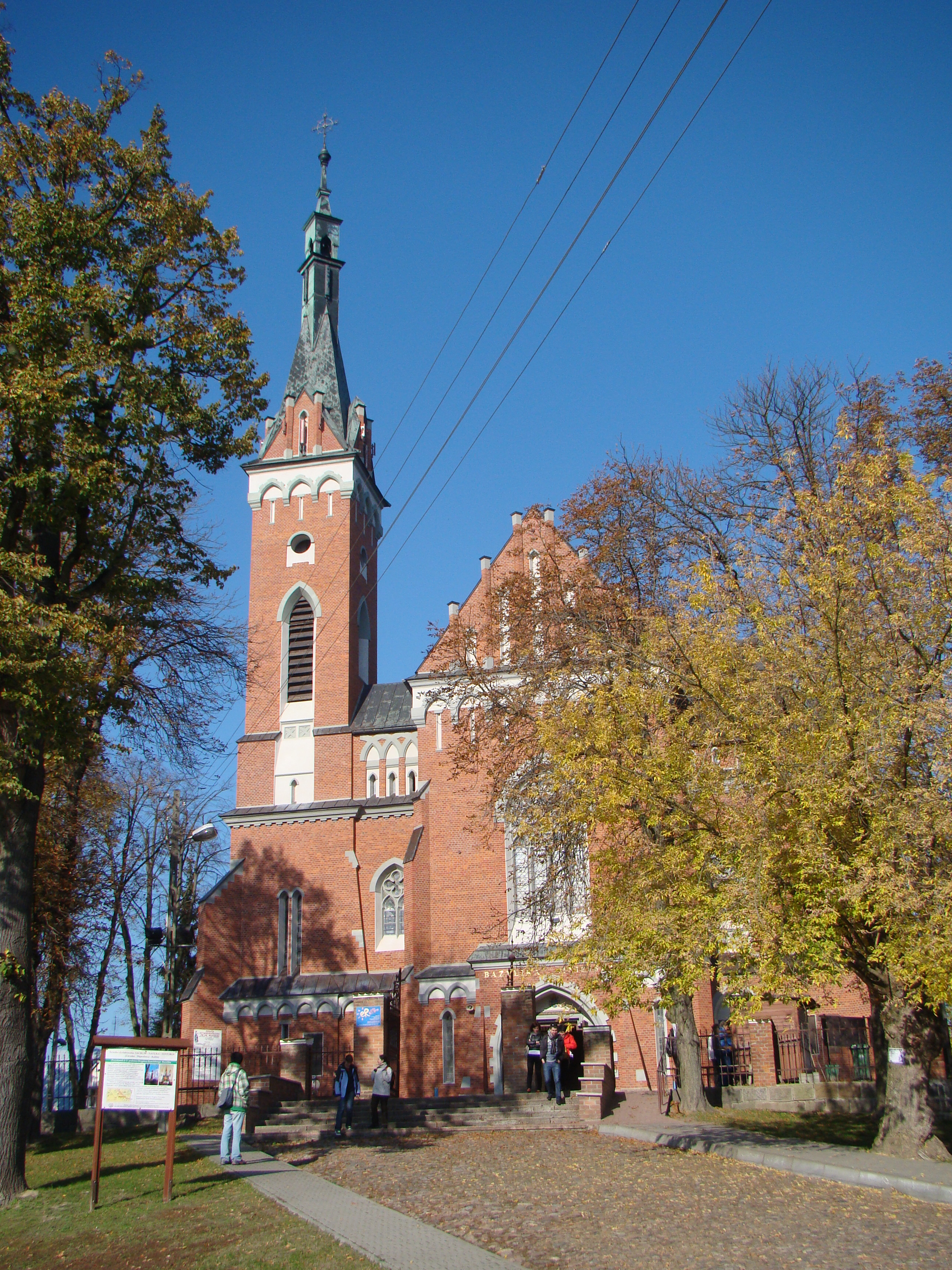
- Basilica church of Saint Adalbert

- Location within Poland
- Coordinates: 51°17′35″N 22°8′40″E
- Country: Poland
- Voivodeship: Lublin
- County: Puławy
- Gmina: Wąwolnica
- First mentioned: 1027
- Town rights: before 1370

Population
  - Total: 1,041
- Time zone: UTC+1 (CET)
  - Summer (DST): UTC+2 (CEST)
- Vehicle registration: LPU

Wąwolnica [vɔ̃vɔlˈnit͡sa] is a town in Puławy County, Lublin Voivodeship, in eastern Poland. It is the seat of the gmina (administrative district) called Gmina Wąwolnica.

== Legendary origins ==
According to legend, around the seventh century AD (some sources mention that it was probably 721) Prince Krak came from Kraków. Visiting the area, he found the site of the current Wąwolnica, which he named Wąwelnica, from the name of his home (Wawel). The coat of arms of the town shows St. George (Prince Krak was believed to have slain the Wawel Dragon).

== History ==
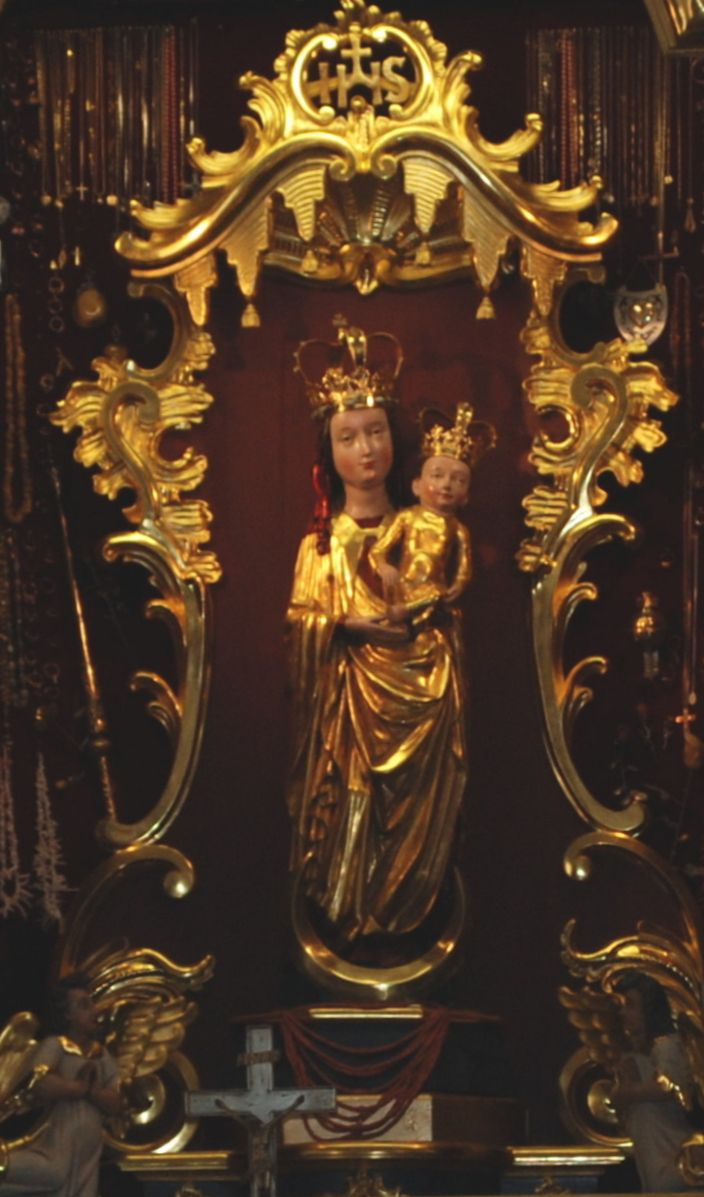
Medieval Virgin of Kębło statue at the local church

Wąwolnica is one of the oldest settlements in Lesser Poland (initially as part of the Sandomierz Voivodeship, and later in the Lublin Voivodeship in the Lesser Poland Province). Together with Bochotnica it formed the heart of the local administrative unit. A manuscript stored at the Holy Cross monastery on Łysa Góra states: "In 1027 the Fathers of our monastery parish ministry did newly establish and newly convert to the Holy Faith the Wawelnica settlement." Traces of occupation go back to the Stone Age. In the 13th century there already was a fortified town lying on a major highway leading from the commercial crossings on the Vistula river near present-day Kazimierz Dolny, via Rzeczyca, Wąwolnica to Lublin. The parish chronicle has preserved a written record of mediaeval local history: "Haunted was the year 1278 for the Polish. The Tatar onslaught flooded it all. Lublin was devastated as most of the others were, then, in rushed legions on barbaric raids, set-up their main camp, and kept bringing in fresh blood dripping booty. Hundreds of thousands of unfortunate prisoners were destined to be slaves for the Khan." This event marks the beginning of the cult of the Virgin Mary of Kębło. The settlement received its town charter from King Casimir III the Great before 1370 and became a royal town. The castle (royal tower), the royal chapel of the church of St. Adalbert, and the defensive wall (to a thickness of 3 meters) were built. The reign of king Casimir III the Great was considered Wąwolnica's heyday.

In 1409 King Władysław II Jagiełło granted Wąwolnica the privilege of a market. From 1444, castellan court proceedings were held in Wąwolnica by the Castellan of Lublin. In 1448 there was a change in the town's legal status with the adoption of the Magdeburg law. In 1458 king Casimir IV Jagiellon gave the parish to the Benedictines of the Holy Cross, who took over the patronage of the city and parish. The patronage expired in 1819 after the annulment of the law, the right of patronage over the parish went to Prince Adam Jerzy Czartoryski. In the 16th century courts were held by the Governor for the nobility of Lublin. In 1567 Wąwolnica was completely burnt. King Sigismund II Augustus ordered the Lublin voivode Jan Firlej to rebuild it, and so the town was moved to its new (present) location. In 1638, the church for the Benedictine monastery was consecrated, converted from the former royal chapel. Since the 17th century the town declined severely, then was subsequently destroyed by the armies of Russia, Sweden, and Saxony.

Historical population
Year	Pop.	±%
1827	1,132	—
1857	1,426	+26.0%
1883	1,693	+18.7%

Following the Third Partition of Poland, in 1795, Wąwolnica became part of the Austrian partition of Poland. After the Polish victory in the Austro-Polish War of 1809, it became part of the short-lived Duchy of Warsaw. In 1815, it became part of the Russian-controlled Congress Kingdom of Poland. In 1819, the monastery was dissolved. In 1820, Wawolnica was down to 132 wooden houses and 4 brick houses, with 1,034 residents. In 1870, the Tsarist authorities deprived Wąwolnica of civic rights as an act of reprisal for assisting the January Uprising. Following World War I, Poland regained independence and control of Wąwolnica. In 1921, 1,043 Jews, representing 35% of the total population, lived in Wąwolnica.

=== World War II and post-war years ===
In September 1939, Germany invaded Poland beginning World War II, and occupied Wąwolnica. They robbed and brutalized the Jewish population which had been around 900 before the war. In 1941, they confined them to a ghetto and conscripted many for forced labor. In March 1942, the SS took about 120 Jews to the cemetery and murdered them. Women had to carry the bodies and bury them at the Jewish cemetery. Later that month, the rest of the Jewish community was deported to Opole Lubelskie from where they were taken to the Bełżec death camp a few days later and murdered there. Only a few dozen of Wąwolnica's Jews survived the German occupation. After German occupation, Wąwolnica was restored to Poland, although with a Soviet-installed communist regime, which stayed in power until the 1980s.

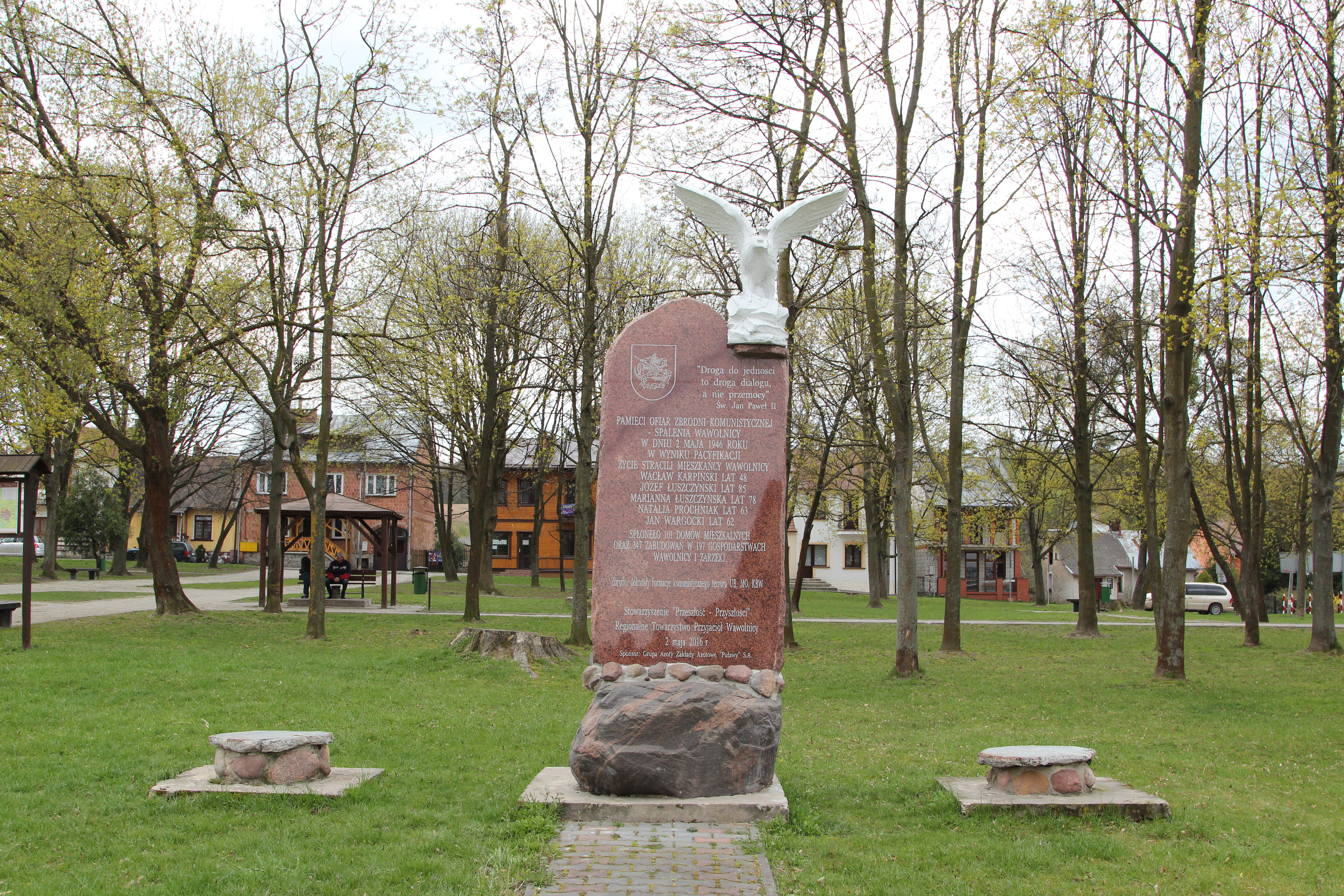
Memorial commemorating the victims of the communist pacification of Wąwolnica

In 1946, on 2 May, the village was burnt down by the UB for fostering the anti-communist underground. 101 homes, 106 barns, 121 cowsheds, 120 pigsties and other farm buildings were burned, many of them along with the livestock. Two people died in the fires, one person died of a heart attack, and many were injured. By accident, the event was witnessed and photographed by John Vachon, a professional American photographer with the UNRRA mission in Poland, who happened to be travelling through the area. His photographs remained unpublished for decades and were only released after his death in 1975.

== Sights ==
The present parish church of St. Adalbert was built in 1907–1914. The church was designed by K. Drozdowski in the "neo-Vistula" style, with three naves in red brick. In 2001 Pope John Paul II raised the church to the status of minor basilica. A church has been present on the site since the 11th century.

Next to the church, in the presbytery of what remains of the old Gothic church, there is a statue of Virgin Mary of Kębło, the object of special veneration and numerous pilgrimages.

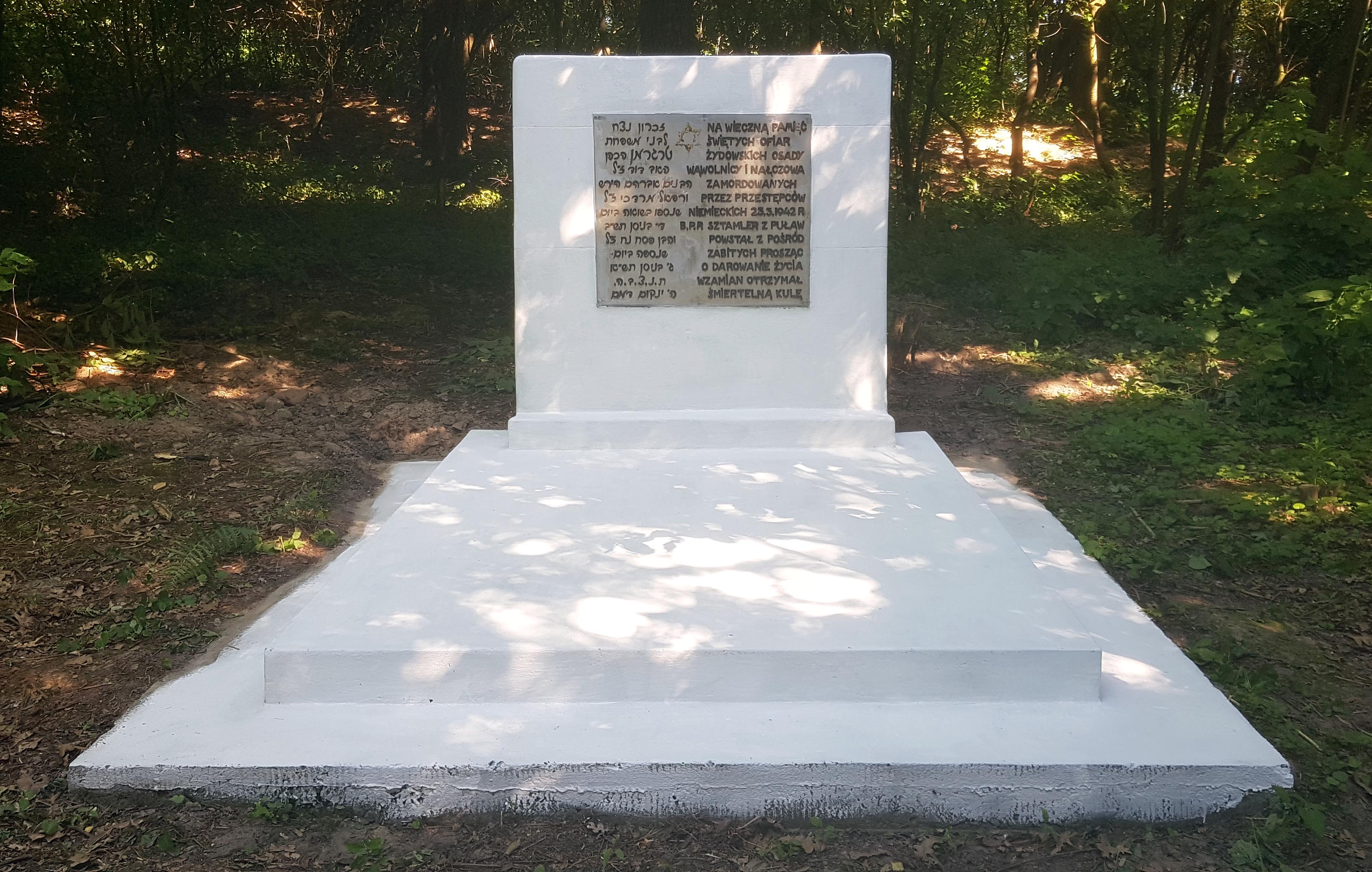
Memorial to Holocaust victims

There are remnants of a pre-war Jewish cemetery with a few tombstone fragments and a monument commemorating the victims of the German-perpetrated massacre from March 1942. It was built in 1993 by Sara Tregerman-Ryterski (1917–2011), whose father and brothers were murdered in the massacre,. The monument contains inscriptions in Polish and Hebrew. The Polish inscription is a dedication to the eternal memory of the victims and to one of the men who raised from the bodies around him, pleaded to spare his life and in return was shot dead. The inscription in Hebrew is a dedication to the victims of the Tregerman family, whom she carried and buried in the cemetery: Her father David and her brothers Abraham Hirsch, Refael Mordechai and Pesach Noah.

There is also a monument commemorating the victims of the communist pacification of Wąwolnica in May 1946.

== Tourism ==
Wąwolnica is located on the edge of the Kazimierz Landscape Park, between the major tourist centers of Puławy, Kazimierz Dolny and Nałęczów.

The Wąwolnica route passes through on the historic narrow-gauge Nałęczowskiej Commuter Rail. Tourist trains run on the route.

== Sports ==
The local football team is KS Wawel Wąwolnica.

== People associated with Wąwolnica ==
- Józef Gosławski (1908–1963), Polish sculptor and medal artist. He spent his childhood and also the occupation years in Wąwolnica.
- Stanisław Gosławski (1918–2008), Polish sculptor and author of many works of decorative arts, born in Wąwolnica.
