= Lublin Upland =

Geographical region in southeastern Poland

Coordinates: 50°50′2.508″N 22°38′53.1492″E

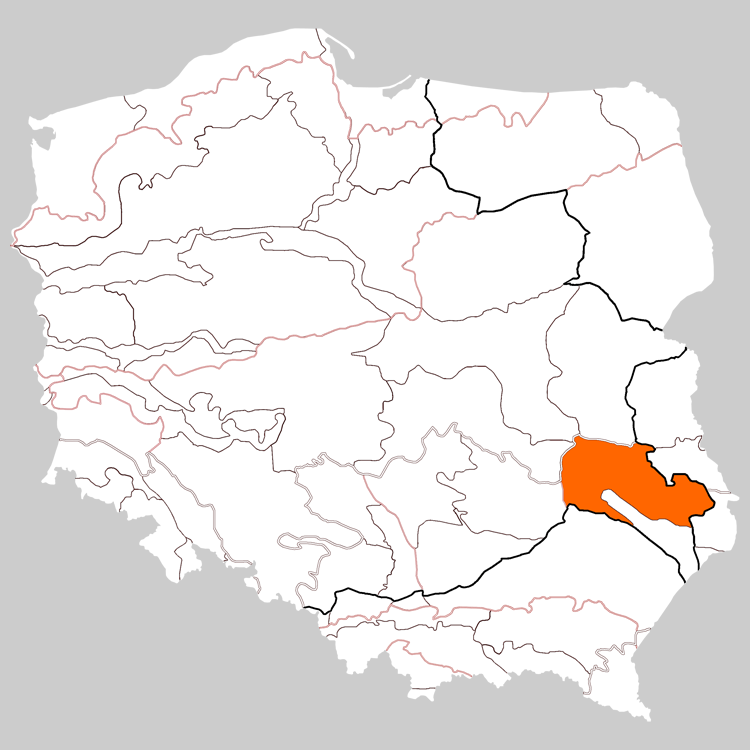
Lublin Upland on the map of Poland

Lublin Upland (Polish: Wyżyna Lubelska) is a geographical region in southeastern Poland, located in Lublin Voivodeship, between the rivers Vistula and Bug, around the city of Lublin. Its area is about 7,200 km^{2} and its highest elevation is 314 m above sea level. It is located in Lublin Voivodeship. In its southern portion it becomes the Roztocze range, and in the north, it turns into Lublin Polesie (Polesie Lubelskie). Biggest cities of the region are Lublin, Chełm, Zamość, Puławy, and Kraśnik. In some geography works, the term Lublin Upland (or (Eastern Lesser Poland Upland, Wyzyna Wschodniomalopolska) is used to describe all Polish uplands located east of the Vistula river. In this case, Roztocze, with its highest point (Wielki Dzial, 390 meters above sea level) also makes part of Lublin Upland.

The upland is famous for its loess valleys, which are numerous in the area of Kazimierz Dolny, Bochotnica and Kraśnik. Furthermore, due to its rich and fertile black soil, Lublin Upland is one of the best developed agricultural regions of the nation, with wheat, tobacco and hops fields. Most important local plant, however, is the sugar beet, which resulted in the presence of several sugar refineries. Forested areas are few, with most of them located in the south (see Solska Forest). There are three landscape parks located in Lublin Upland: Kazimierz Dolny Landscape Park, Wieprz River Landscape Park, and Krzczonow Landscape Park. Most important tourist centers are Lublin, Zamość, Kazimierz, the spa of Nałęczów, Puławy and Józefów.

== See also ==
- Lesser Polish Gorge of the Vistula
