= Witoszyn =

Witoszyn may refer to the following places:

- Witoszyn, Lublin Voivodeship (east Poland)
- Witoszyn, Lubusz Voivodeship (west Poland)
- Witoszyn, West Pomeranian Voivodeship (north-west Poland)
