= Kębło =

- Village
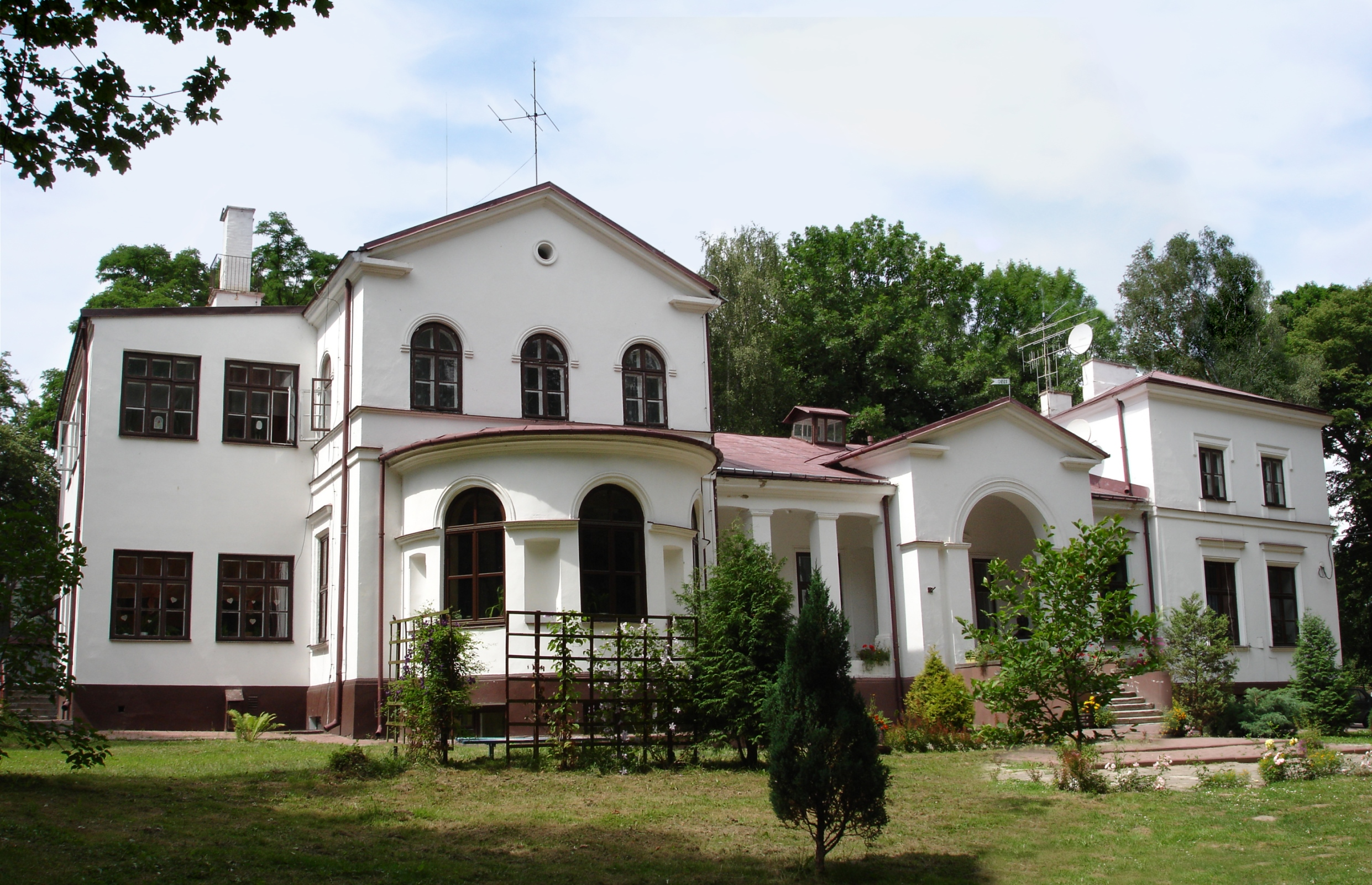
- Manor in Kęblo

- Location within Poland
- Coordinates: 51°16′52″N 22°07′17″E
- Country: Poland
- Voivodeship: Lublin
- County: Puławy
- Gmina: Wąwolnica
- Time zone: UTC+1 (CET)
  - Summer (DST): UTC+2 (CEST)

Kębło [ˈkɛmbwɔ] is a village in the administrative district of Gmina Wąwolnica, within Puławy County, Lublin Voivodeship, in eastern Poland.

== History ==
13 Polish citizens were murdered by Nazi Germany in the village during World War II.

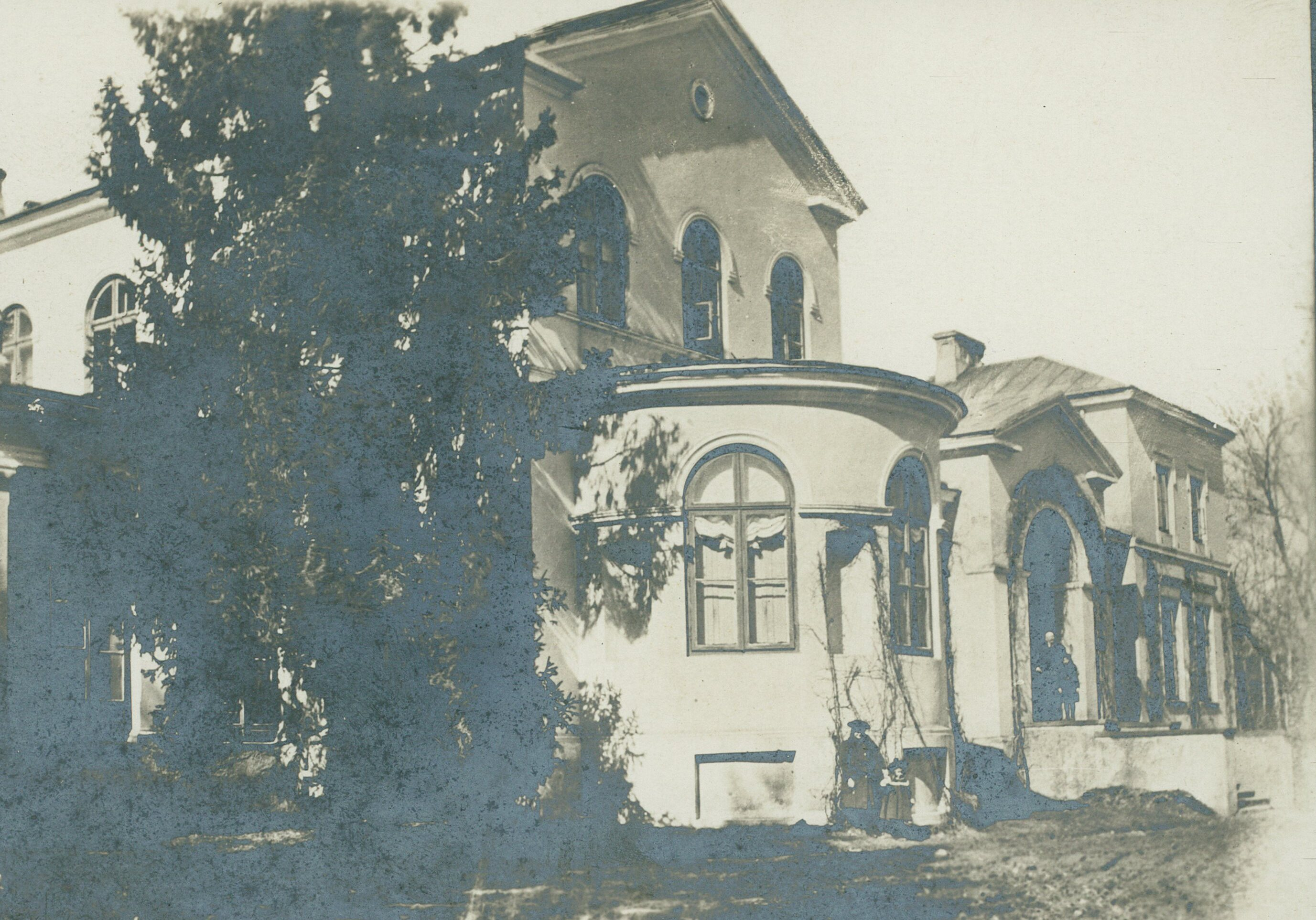
Palace before 1914

== See also ==
- Virgin Kębelska
