= Parchatka =

- Village
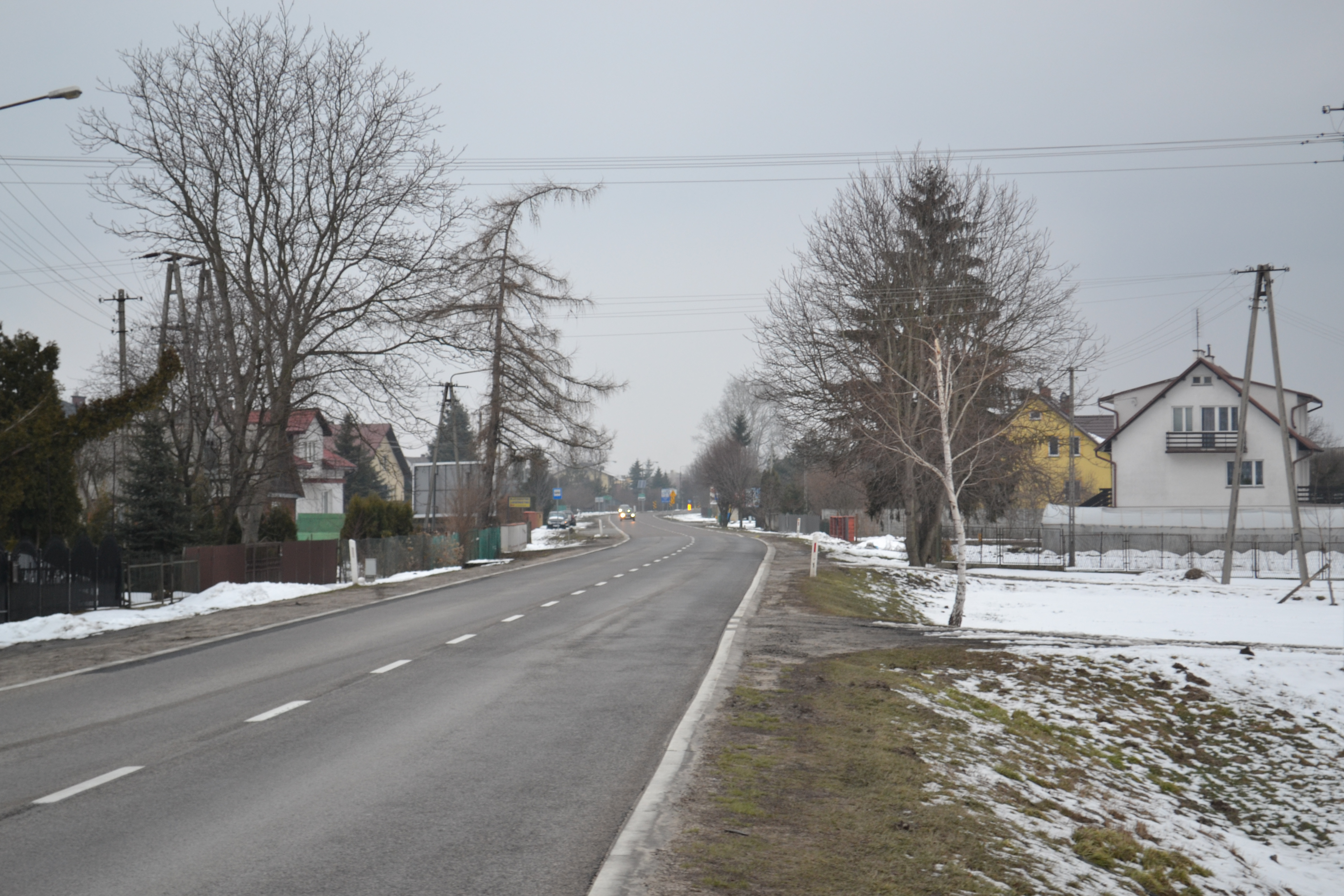
- Parchatka during winter

- Location within Poland
- Coordinates: 51°22′0″N 21°59′48″E
- Country: Poland
- Voivodeship: Lublin
- County: Puławy
- Gmina: Kazimierz Dolny
- Time zone: UTC+1 (CET)
  - Summer (DST): UTC+2 (CEST)
- Vehicle registration: LPU

Parchatka [parˈxatka] is a village in the administrative district of Gmina Kazimierz Dolny, within Puławy County, Lublin Voivodeship, in eastern Poland.

== History ==
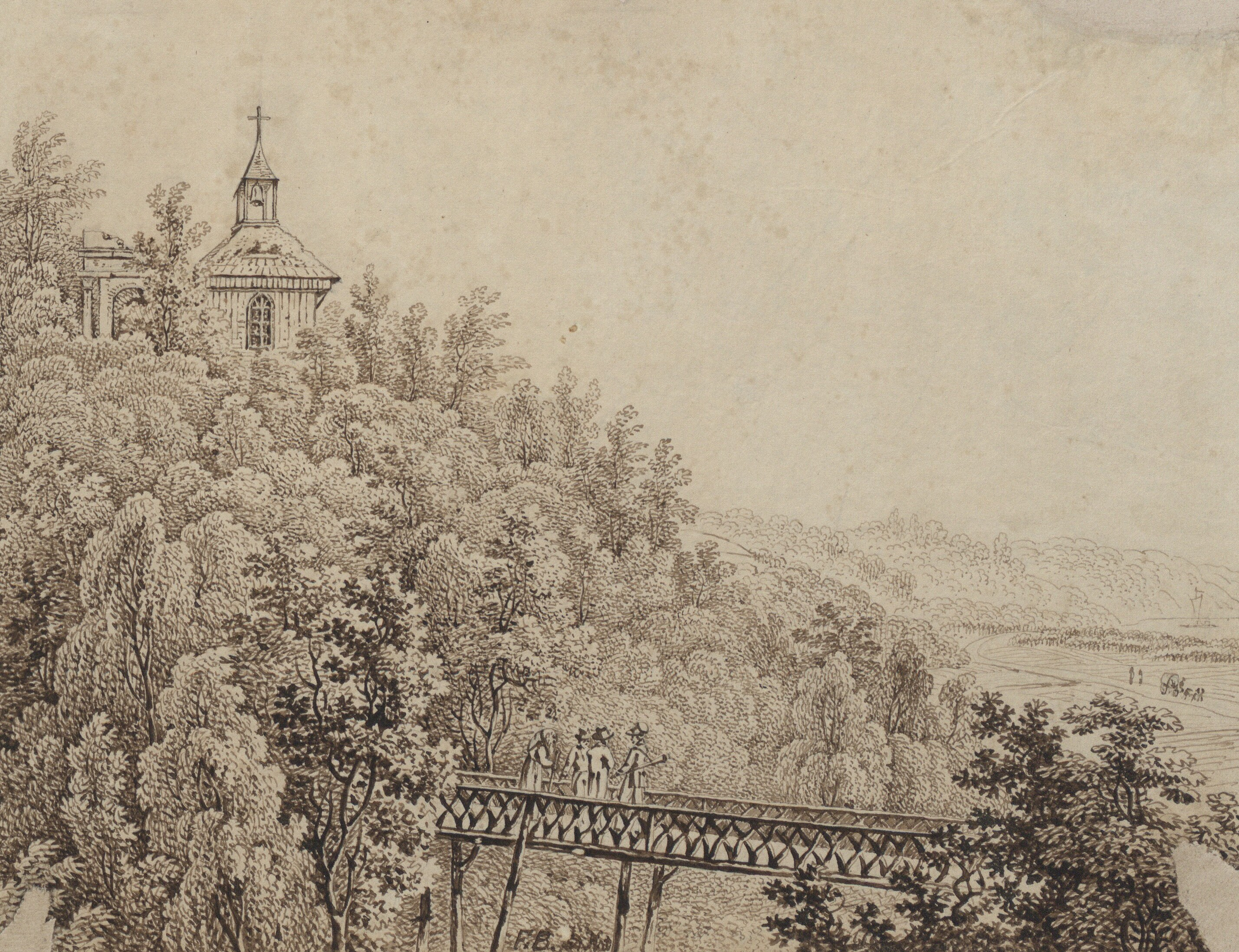
Parchatka, after 1819

According to the 1921 Polish census, Parchatka had a population of 379, exclusively Polish by nationality.

Following the German-Soviet invasion of Poland, which started World War II in September 1939, the village was occupied by Germany until 1944. On 18 November 1942, the ethnic Ukrainian 14th Waffen Grenadier Division of the SS (1st Galician) and the Ukrainian Auxiliary Police committed a massacre of 28 Poles, and arrested further 25 Poles, who were first sent to the German prison at the Lublin Castle and then the Auschwitz concentration camp, with only five surviving and returning after the war.
