= Łukawiec, Lubaczów County =

Łukawiec
- Village
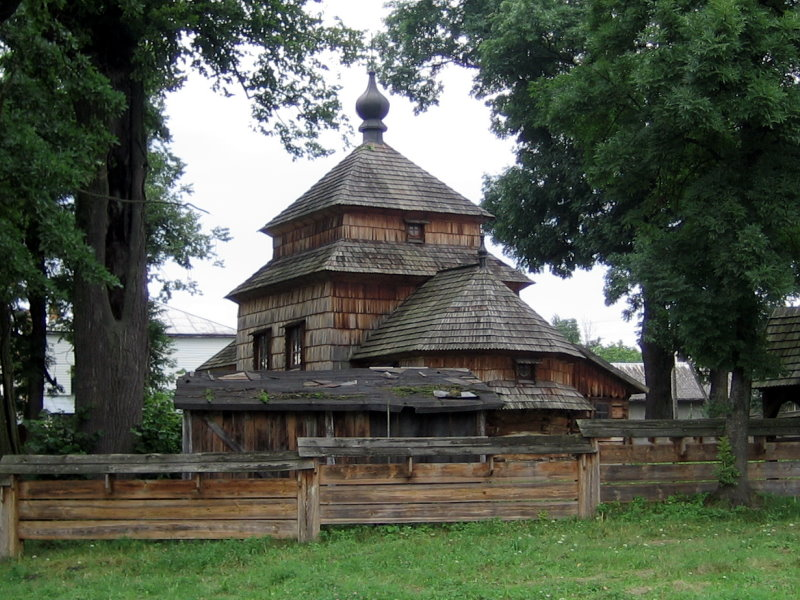
- Former Greek Catholic church

- Location within Poland
- Coordinates: 50°4′N 23°7′E
- Country: Poland
- Voivodeship: Subcarpathian
- County: Lubaczów
- Gmina: Wielkie Oczy

Łukawiec [wuˈkavʲɛt͡s] is a village in the administrative district of Gmina Wielkie Oczy, within Lubaczów County, Subcarpathian Voivodeship, in south-eastern Poland, close to the border with Ukraine. Łukawiec has existed since the XVIth Century.

== Location ==
Łukawiec is located in south-eastern Poland. The administrative area of Łukawiec, together with several hamlets, is 35.80 km^{2} (13.82 sq mi). Łukawiec is the largest town in the commune. The village is characterized by compact buildings with a chain character. Łukawiec is composed of several parts and hamlets, including Wola, Sydory, Tarnawskie, Zarzeka, Zabuczyna, Zacerkiew, Zakościół and Zagrobla.

== Education ==
The figure of Bolesław Müller, the founder and manager of the local school, is associated with Łukawiec. In August 1939, he was mobilized as a reserve officer of the Podhale regiment and fought in the September Campaign. He was then arrested and sent to a prisoner-of-war camp in Starobielsk where he shared the fate of Polish officers murdered in the East. The last message from him came from 1940. He died in Kharkov. The school building in Łukawiec houses a plaque commemorating his merits.

== Religion ==
Most of the inhabitants are Catholics. Łukawiec parish was separated from the Lubaczów parish on July 1, 1754. Archbishop Mieczysław Mokrzycki, who was a personal secretary of John Paul II comes from Łukawiec.

- Roman Catholic Sanctuary of Our Lady is located in the village. The Blessed Virgin Mary Queen of Poland's Church was built in years: 1980–1989. The miraculous Icon of Our Lady of Łukawiec from Tartaków is displayed in the main altar. There is also the Chapel of St. John Paul II in the church.

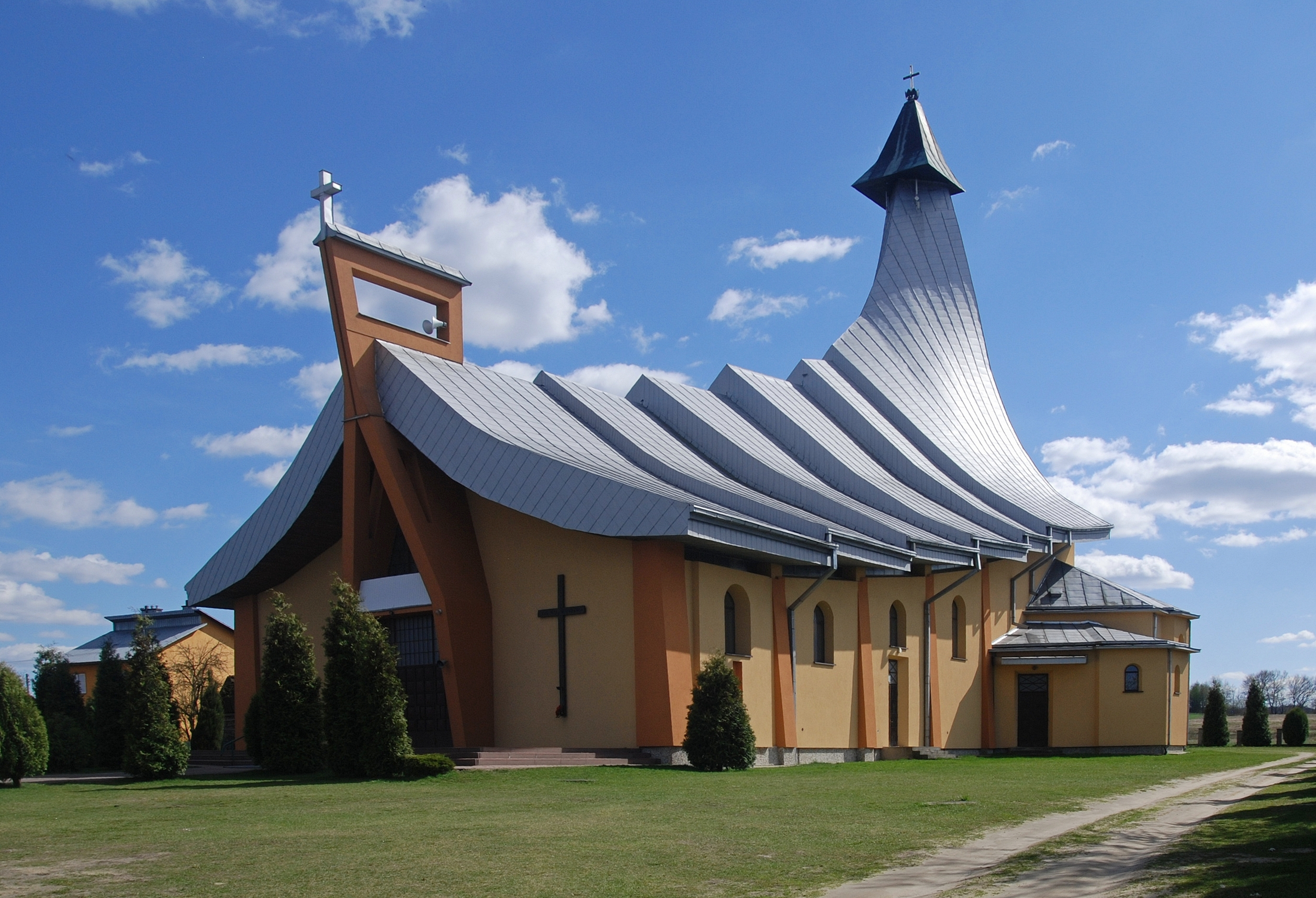
Sanctuary of Our Lady of Łukawiec

== Monuments ==
Łukawiec is located on the Wooden Architecture Route (route VI).

- Former Greek Catholic church of the Holy Spirit St. Dymitra Martyr, erected in 1701. Rebuilt in 1923 (including a new women's gallery with a vestibule, and the sacristy was added to the sanctuary). From 1947, unused. In the 1960s, changed to a warehouse. In 1987, damaged by a fire. Renovations with the restoration of the original appearance of the western part were carried out in 1990–1994. The object belongs to a group of traditional wooden churches of the Eastern Church. Its spatial layout - tripartite plan and single-body shape clearly refers to the oldest wooden churches from the 16th-17th century.
- Former Roman Catholic Church of Epiphany (Three Wise Man), built in 1754. According to tradition, the church was purchased and transferred from Narola. The church was renewed many times. During the renovation in 1948–1950, the form of a turret for a signature was changed. During the renovation in 1974–1975, the vestibule was extended. The last renovation was carried out in 2007.
- Belfry hung between two old oaks (next to the church).

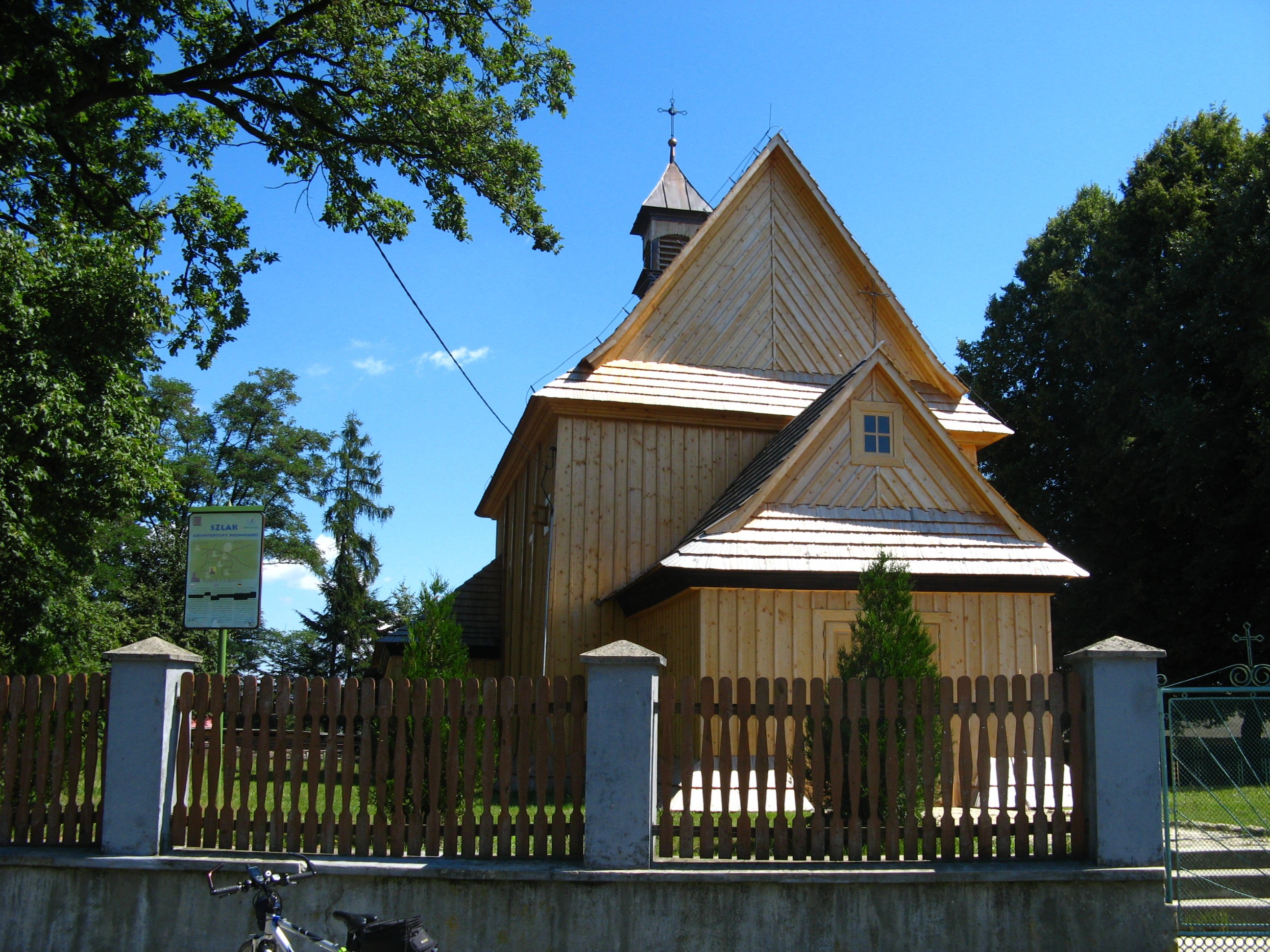
Church of Three Wise Man from the 17th Century

== Environment ==
- Natural monument - pedunculate oak, height: 24 m, trunk circumference: 480 cm at a height of 1.5 m.
- Nature Reserve "Moczary" in Łukawiec Forestry, created on April 19, 2005. Its area is 12.25 ha.
