= Bochotnica =

- Village
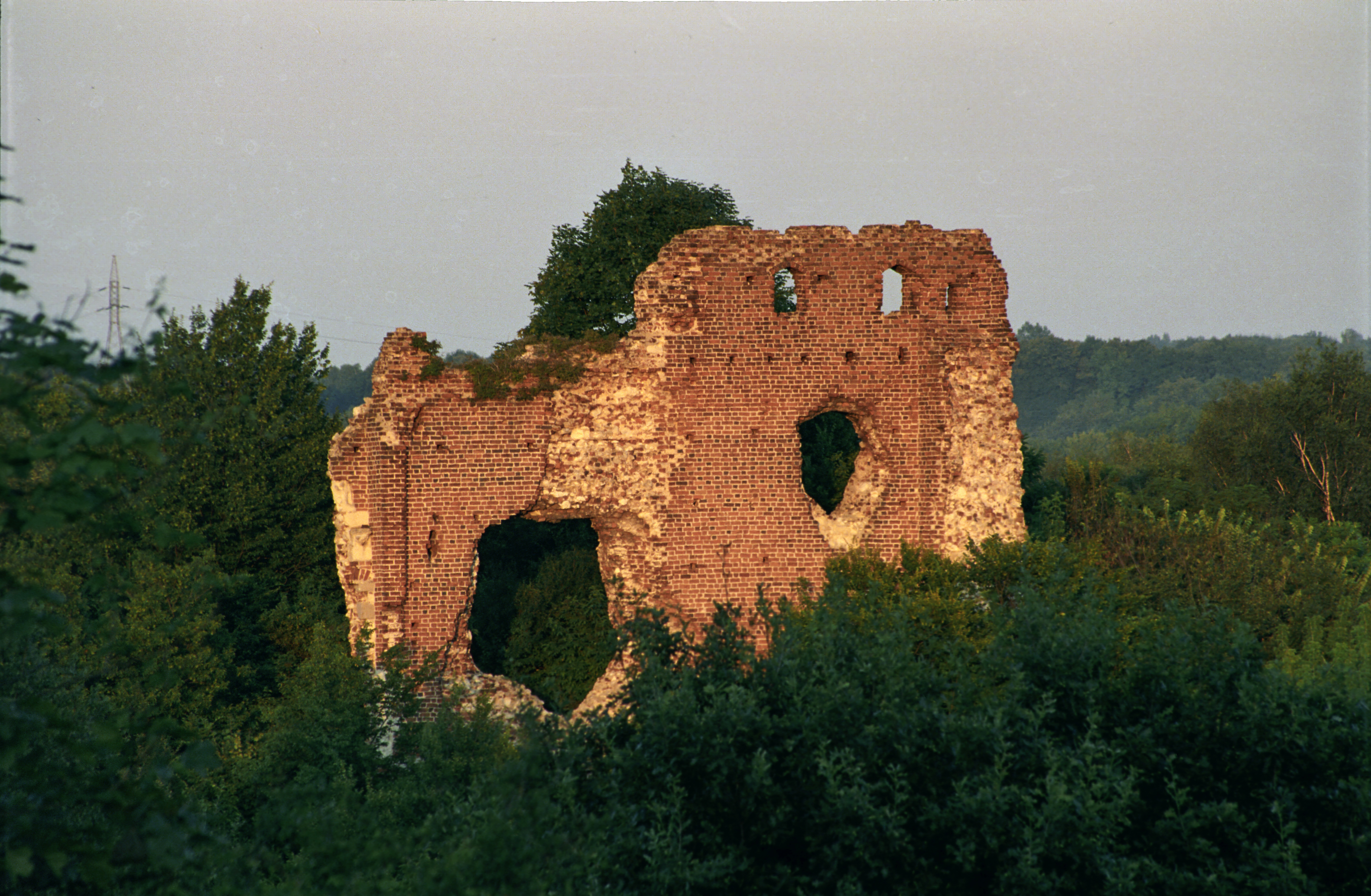
- Castle ruins in Bochotnica

- Location within Poland
- Coordinates: 51°20′N 21°59′E
- Country: Poland
- Voivodeship: Lublin
- County: Puławy
- Gmina: Kazimierz Dolny
- Population: 1,000

Bochotnica [bɔxɔtˈnit͡sa] is a village in the administrative district of Gmina Kazimierz Dolny, within Puławy County, Lublin Voivodeship, in eastern Poland. The village is located on the right bank of the Vistula, on the road between Puławy and Kazimierz Dolny. The ruins of a 14th-century castle are located nearby.

Bochotnica, which in the past was also called Bochotnica Mała (to distinguish it from nearby Bochotnica-Kolonia, or Bochotnica Wielka), is one of the oldest settlements in Lesser Poland. In the early years of the Kingdom of Poland, it was an important gord, located along merchant route from Kievan Rus towards central Poland. It now is a local tourist center, due to the picturesque Lesser Polish Gorge of the Vistula and proximity of Kazimierz Landscape Park. The village does not have a rail station, the nearest one is located at Puławy. It is a local road junction, where three roads meet.

Even though no documents exist to prove it, Bochotnica already was a defensive settlement in the 6th century. This was confirmed by archaeologists, who in 1993 found here remains of the gord, together with a pagan cemetery and several artifacts, such as bronze and iron tools, gold coins and a 10th-century sword. Together with neighboring Wąwolnica, Bochotnica was a local administrative center. In 1317, King Władysław Łokietek handed Bochotnica and other local villages to brothers Ostaszko and Dzierżko from Bejsce (Lewart coat of arms). The defensive castle at Bochotnica was erected probably in 1340, after a devastating Tatar raid of Lublin Land. The stronghold was rectangular shaped, located on a hill, which provided it with a good view of the area. In the 15th century, the castle belonged to the Kurowski family, then it passed into the hands of Voivode of Lublin, Jan Oleśnicki, who changed his last name into Bochotnicki. On his initiative, the castle was remodeled in Renaissance style. Bochotnicki died childless, and after his death, in the late 16th century, the castle began to turn into a ruin. The village belonged to several families (Borkowski, Tarło, Lubomirski, Sanguszko, Potocki), and in 1826 it was owned by Adam Jerzy Czartoryski, whose properties were confiscated by the Russians as a punishment for November Uprising. In 1886, new owner Józef Klemensowski, briefly considered reconstruction of the castle, but changed his plans.

Until the Partitions of Poland, Bochotnica belonged to Lesser Poland's Lublin Voivodeship. In 1815, it became part of Russian-controlled Congress Poland, and after World War I, it returned to Poland. On November 18, 1942, German occupiers murdered 45 people at local town square, as a reprisal for attack on a German patrol. After World War II, Bochotnica was a center of anticommunist resistance. On May 24, 1945, a battle between ex-Home Army unit and the NKVD took place, in which 16 Soviet agents and 10 Polish Communist collaborators were killed.
