= Gmina Kazimierz Dolny =

Gmina Kazimierz Dolny Kazimierz Dolny Commune
- Gmina
- Flag Coat of arms
- Interactive map of Gmina Kazimierz Dolny
- Coordinates (Kazimierz Dolny): 51°19′20″N 21°56′51″E
- Country: Poland
- Voivodeship: Lublin
- County: Puławy
- Seat: Kazimierz Dolny

Area
  - Total: 72.49 km^{2} (27.99 sq mi)

Population (2006)
  - Total: 7,018
  - Density: 96.81/km^{2} (250.7/sq mi)
  - Urban: 3,572
  - Rural: 3,446

Gmina Kazimierz Dolny is an urban-rural gmina (administrative district) in Puławy County, Lublin Voivodeship, in eastern Poland. Its seat is the town of Kazimierz Dolny, which lies approximately 11 kilometres (7 mi) south of Puławy and 45 km (28 mi) west of the regional capital Lublin.

The gmina covers an area of 72.49 square kilometres (28.0 sq mi), and as of 2006 its total population is 7,018 (out of which the population of Kazimierz Dolny amounts to 3,572, and the population of the rural part of the gmina is 3,446).

The gmina contains part of the protected area called Kazimierz Landscape Park.

== Villages ==
Apart from the town of Kazimierz Dolny, Gmina Kazimierz Dolny contains the villages and settlements of Bochotnica, Parchatka, Rzeczyca, Rzeczyca-Kolonia, Skowieszynek, Wierzchoniów, Witoszyn and Zbędowice.

== Neighbouring gminas ==
Gmina Kazimierz Dolny is bordered by the town of Puławy and by the gminas of Janowiec, Karczmiska, Końskowola, Wąwolnica and Wilków.
