= Vistula River Gorge of Lesser Poland =

Coordinates: 51°08′31″N 21°47′13″E

Vistula Gorge of Lesser Poland
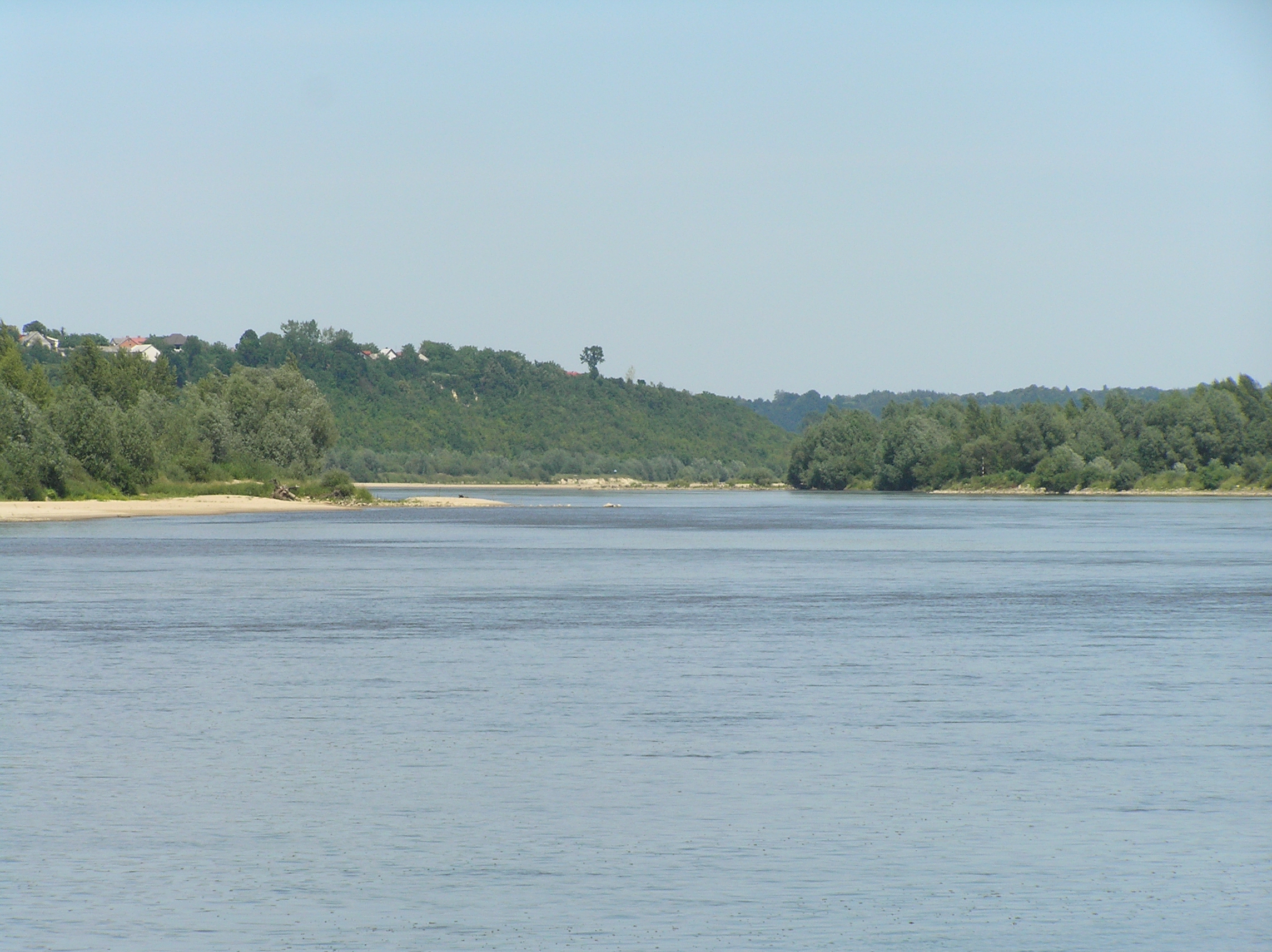
- Gorge of the Vistula in Kazimierz Dolny

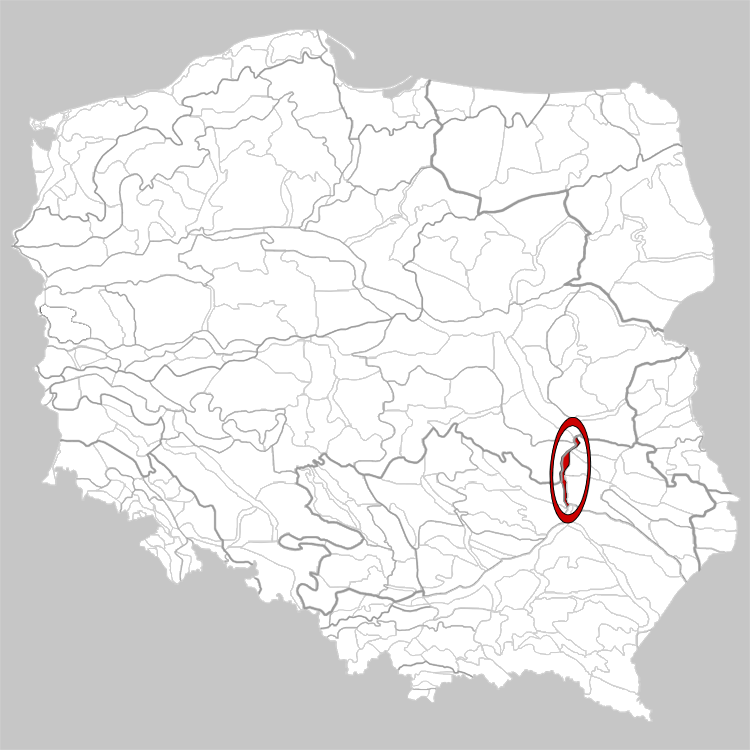
- The location map of the Gorge

The Lesser Poland Gorge of the Vistula (Polish: Małopolski Przełom Wisły) is a geographical region located in central-eastern Poland, which administratively belongs to three Polish voivodeships – Lublin, Masovian, and Świętokrzyskie. The Gorge is for the most part made by the valley of the Vistula, with two Polish uplands on both sides of the river – Lesser Poland (or Małopolska) Upland to the west, and Lublin Upland to the east. The gorge is about 70 kilometers long, extending from the town of Zawichost in the south, to Puławy in the north. It is considerably narrow, only up to 3 kilometers wide. In some places, the banks of the Vistula valley are very steep, up to 70 meters above the water level.

The region comprises a densely populated agricultural land, with two main towns; historic Kazimierz Dolny, and Annopol. Other towns are Józefów, Bochotnica, Janowiec and Wilków. The Gorge is one of several protected areas designated in the Natura 2000 territory of the European Union's ecological network around the Vistula and Pilica rivers (out of the total of around 500 Natura 2000 sites in Poland). They are listed as – Natura 2000 PLB 14000, and Natura 2000 PLH 060045.

== See also ==
- Protected areas of Poland
- Dunajec River Gorge at the tributary of the Vistula River
