= Skowieszynek =

- Village
- Location within Poland
- Coordinates: 51°19′N 22°1′E
- Country: Poland
- Voivodeship: Lublin
- County: Puławy
- Gmina: Kazimierz Dolny

Skowieszynek [skɔvjɛˈʂɨnɛk] is a village in the administrative district of Gmina Kazimierz Dolny, within Puławy County, Lublin Voivodeship, in eastern Poland.
