= Rzeczyca-Kolonia, Puławy County =

Rzeczyca-Kolonia
- Village
- Location within Poland
- Coordinates: 51°17′43″N 22°01′38″E
- Country: Poland
- Voivodeship: Lublin
- County: Puławy
- Gmina: Kazimierz Dolny

Rzeczyca-Kolonia [ʐɛˈt͡ʂɨt͡sa kɔˈlɔɲa] is a village in the administrative district of Gmina Kazimierz Dolny, within Puławy County, Lublin Voivodeship, in eastern Poland.
