= Madonna of Kębło =

Medieval sculpture in Wąwolnica, Lublin, Poland

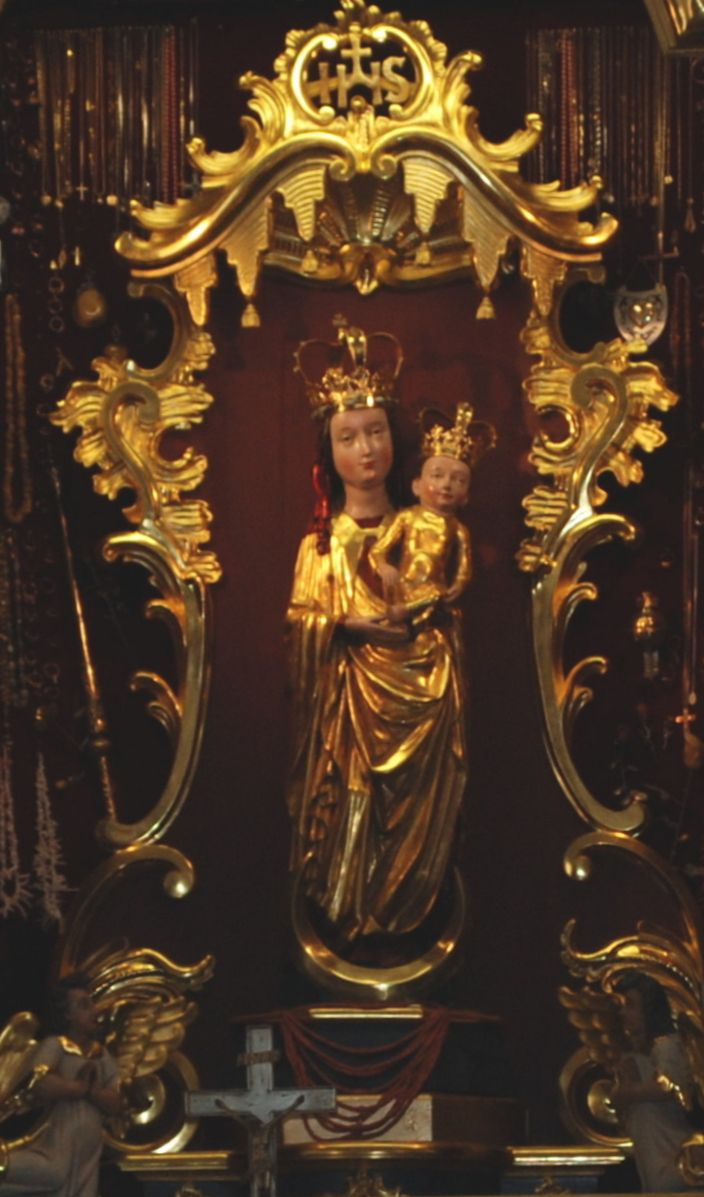
Figure of the Virgin Mary with the baby Christ

Madonna of Kębło (Polish: Matka Boska Kębelska) is a medieval sculpture of the Madonna and Child, located in the shrine in Wąwolnica. The statue was brought to Wąwolnica from the nearby village of Kębło, hence its name.

== Figurine ==
The Gothic sculpture of the Madonna and Child dates from the first half of the fifteenth century (around 1420 to 1440). It was made from a trunk of the lime tree with a height of 85 cm and a diameter at its widest point 27 cm. Its prototype was a stone statue of the Madonna from Vimperk. This style of sculpture is characterized by elegance and courtliness in presenting subtly, drawing a regular face and the richness and decorative draperies into the system. The mother figure is shown presenting the child Jesus to the world.

== History of veneration ==
The tradition of the veneration of Our Lady of Kębło and Wąwolnica probably dates back to the period of invasions by the Tatars at the end of the 13th century.

According to parish records, in the first days of September, 1278, Tartar raiders were sent to the vicinity of Wąwolnica. In the village of Kębło, the Tatars set up camp to gather stolen goods and hold people captive. They set on a huge boulder a stolen statue of the Virgin Mary. At the same time at Głusk Opolski Polish troops under the command of Otto Jastrzębczyk had taken up resistance to the invaders. The Poles won the battle.

When the defeated Tatars wanted to flee with their loot and prisoners, the figure of the Virgin Mary lifted itself into the air, moved a considerable distance and hung above them. Terrified, the Tartars abandoned their loot and prisoners and escaped. After their escape, the figure stood once again at its original location. Seeing this, the prisoners decided that it was God himself who had restored their freedom.

The location of the event became the object of a pilgrimage, and the local landowner Otto Jastrzębczyk decided to build a wooden church, in which the figure was placed.

On 8 September, 1700, the statue was transferred to the parish church in Wąwolnica after the superior of the Benedictines from the Basilica of the Holy Cross (Bazylika mniejsza pw. Trójcy Świętej), Father Chrystyn Mirecki, obtained permission from Pope Clement XII. This was because the old church was falling apart, it had insufficient capacity in relation to the needs of an expanding cult, and the need for greater custody for the miraculous statue. The figurine was placed on the altar, while the church was demolished in Kębło.

In modern times, only the chancel remained from the original 14th-century church, rebuilt in the Renaissance style to the chapel, which is now the shrine of Our Lady.

Pope Paul VI officially granted a decree of canonical coronation to the image on 6 April 1976 which is carried out on 10 September 1978.
