= Rzeczyca, Puławy County =

Rzeczyca
- Village
- Location within Poland
- Coordinates: 51°19′30″N 22°2′10″E
- Country: Poland
- Voivodeship: Lublin
- County: Puławy
- Gmina: Kazimierz Dolny

Population
  - Total: 460
- Time zone: UTC+1 (CET)
  - Summer (DST): UTC+2 (CEST)

Rzeczyca [ʐɛˈt͡ʂɨt͡sa] is a village in the administrative district of Gmina Kazimierz Dolny, within Puławy County, Lublin Voivodeship, in eastern Poland.

== History ==
Seven Polish citizens were murdered by Nazi Germany in the village during World War II.
