= Minor Basilica of Our Lady of La Salette in Dębowiec =

Church in Dębowiec, Podkarpackie Voivodeship, Poland

Coordinates: 49.6841°N 21.4657°E

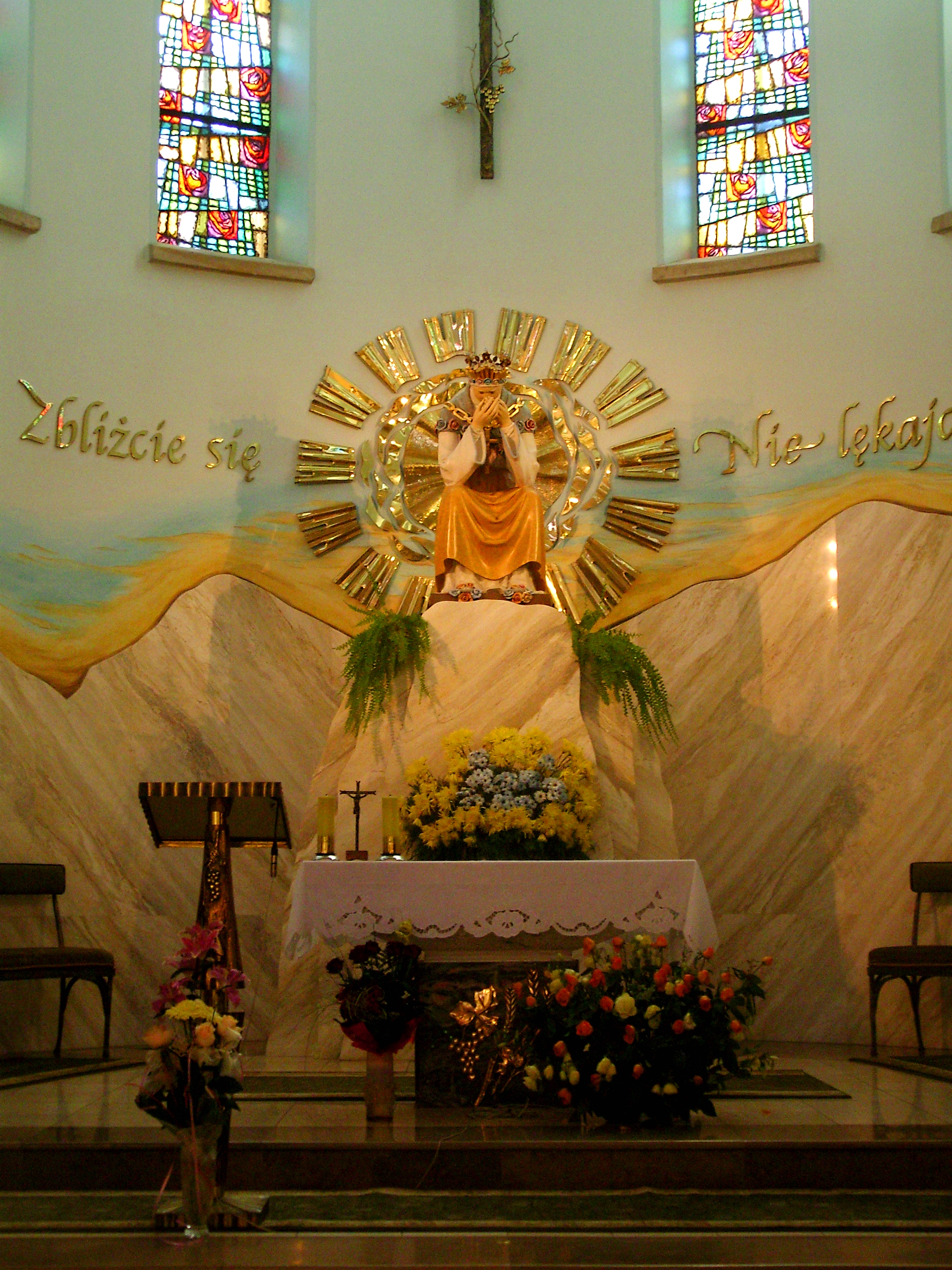

Minor Basilica of Our Lady of La Salette in Dębowiec is a Catholic shrine located in the south-east of Poland, founded by the La Salette Missionaries in 1910 on land bought from the Dębowiec Municipal Board on June 7, 1910.

== History ==
Between 1910 and 1911 the seminary was built and on October 18, 1911, students from the seminary in Puźniki (the first location of the La Salettes in Poland, currently an abandoned village in Ukraine) were moved to Dębowiec. On September 15, 1912, the Missionaries opened and dedicated the first church, which quickly became a center of worship of Our Lady of La Salette in Poland. From that moment on the shrine and monastery in Dębowiec became the mother church for the Missionaries of La Salette in Poland
Services in honour of Our Lady of La Salette were introduced in September 1923 and, as of 2017, are still currently held. The initiator of the services was Fr. Andrew Skibinski M.S.

In 1936 Missionaries began building a new church. The construction took them two years, but the shrine was not dedicated until 1941.
The Missionaries petitioned for their church to be elevated to the rank of minor basilica in 2005. The Holy See's decree was signed on August 22, 2011. The shrine has been elevated on May 20, 2012, after a three-day celebration.

After the Mass the mayor of Dębowiec, Zbigniew Staniszewski, said:

"Wherever I am – in Poland or abroad –I inevitably meet people who know about our La Salette Shrine. Now, with elevation of the Church to a Minor Basilica, La Salette and our town will become even more well known!".

=== Calvary ===
Three sets of figures representing the revelation of Our Lady of La Salette built in 1929. They are located on a small hill next to the church. Some of the figures were damaged during World War II and have visible bullet holes in them.

=== Messenger of Our Lady of La Salette ===
In 1921, in celebration of the 75th anniversary of the revelations in La Salette, the Missionaries started issuing a bi-monthly journal titled "Messenger of Our Lady of La Salette". The editor's position was given to priest M. Kolbuch, the first Polish M.S.
