= Witoszyn, Lublin Voivodeship =

Witoszyn
- Village
- Location within Poland
- Coordinates: 51°20′N 22°4′E
- Country: Poland
- Voivodeship: Lublin
- County: Puławy
- Gmina: Kazimierz Dolny

Witoszyn [viˈtɔʂɨn] is a village in the administrative district of Gmina Kazimierz Dolny, within Puławy County, Lublin Voivodeship, in eastern Poland.
