= Our Lady of Łukawiec =

Roman Catholic icon

Our Lady of Łukawiec (Our Lady of Tartaków)
- Matka Boża Łukawiecka (Tartakowska) (Polish)
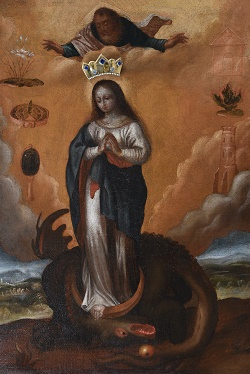
- Type: Painting
- Medium: Tempera on oak planks
- Subject: Blessed Virgin Mary
- Condition: On display
- Location: Sanctuary of Our Lady of Łukawiec, Łukawiec

Our Lady of Łukawiec (Polish: Matka Boża Łukawiecka), earlier Our Lady of Tartaków (Polish: Matka Boża Tartakowska), also known as Our Lady Full of Graces (Polish: Matka Boża Łaskawa) is a Roman Catholic icon of the Blessed Virgin Mary.

== Description ==
The painting shows the Mother of God standing one foot on the crescent moon that is on top of a dying dragon. Mary is dressed in a long, down-to-earth dress, covered with a dark blue cloak. Her hair is dissolved, reaching her shoulders, and her head is turned to the right, slightly tilted down. Mary has slightly closed eyes, and her face is focused and gentle. Hands are folded for prayer. In the lower part of the painting, under the feet of the Mother of God you can see the winged dragon, who is dying, and next to the apple lying on the ground. Above Mother of God's figure floats God the Father with a gray beard, clothed in robes, spreading His hands over Mary, protecting Her and the whole Earth. On the right and left you can see Marian symbols like lilies among thorns, Mirror of Justice, Tree of Life on the left side and the Blue Gate, the Burning Bush and the Tower of David on the right. Clouds are visible in the image. The colors of the upper part are bright, while the bottom, where the dragon is visible, the colors are dark, showing the contrast.

== History ==
=== In Tartaków ===
The image of the Immaculate Conception was painted on a canvas stuck to the board at the beginning of the 17th century by an unknown Italian painter and placed at the Potocki castle in the town of Tartaków. "It imagines Blessed Virgin Mary with hands folded to pray, standing on the moon, under which the rolled-up snake bites the apple. Above her, God the Father spreads his hands". After the great fire of the castle, the painting found its way to chaplain Stanisław Potocki and the local parish priest Mikołaj Kucharski in 1727. After his death, the image of the Virgin Mary was in 1764 placed in the local St. Michael the Archangel's church above the baptismal font. The following year, the painting was moved to the main altar. In 1765 from 9 to 24 March, the painting, as it was described, "cried". From the eyes of Virgin Mary bloody tears squeezed out, which fell or dried in the image. According to witnesses, a glow was visible above the church during those days, leading people to believe that a fire had broken out in the church, and the painting itself was said to be shimmering with colors. In 1777, the painting was considered miraculous, and two years later placed in a specially prepared, on the initiative of priest Kostkiewicz, a new huge main altar. A specially prepared book recorded 407 cases of miracles that were said to have been performed through the intercession of Our Lady of Tartaków. In addition, over 300 votive offerings were collected for graces received. Countess Anna Potocka funded a silver and gold dress, a crown of stars, and a crescent moon to adorn the image.

=== In Łukawiec ===
In 1944, the painting was fortunately saved from destruction by Polish nuns, the Sisters Servants from Dębica, who transported it to Poland, to the general house of the congregation. In 1961, the painting was transported to Krakow by Archbishop Eugeniusz Baziak, who resided in Lubaczów and the nearby village of Łukawiec. In Krakow, the painting was probably renovated. In 1963, it found its way to Lubaczów. The parish in Tarnoszyn also sought to acquire it. Ultimately, however, the painting was handed over to the parish of Łukawiec in 1965 by the apostolic administrator of the Archdiocese of Lubaczów, Professor Jan Nowicki. On 28 November of that year, it was placed in the main altar of the wooden church of the Epiphany (Three Kings) in Łukawiec. This was done at the request of former parishioners from Tartaków, for whom it was easier to travel to Łukawiec than to the more distant Tarnoszyn. As in Tartaków, the painting was unveiled and covered during the singing of songs in honour of the Virgin Mary.

Due to the increasing number of the believers, both from Łukawiec and from Tartaków, a decision was made to build a new church in Łukawiec. The Church of Blessed Virgin Mary Queen of Poland in Łukawiec was consecrated by Bishop Marian Jaworski in 1990. In the same year, the image of Mary was placed in the main altar. The new church became the Sanctuary of Our Lady of Łukawiec. On 3 June 1991, the painting was crowned in Lubaczów by Pope John Paul II during one of his pilgrimages to Poland. On 15 May 2004, a dedicated and crowned copy of the painting was donated to the church in Tartaków. In 2016, the painting underwent renovation in Krakow. In connection with the 25th anniversary of the coronation of the image on 3 June 2016, a new, larger altar was built in the sanctuary. The restored image was placed in the new altar on 4 June, and the new altar and tabernacle were consecrated by Archbishop Mieczysław Mokrzycki, a native of the Łukawiec parish, on 8 June during the main anniversary celebrations. Since then, the image has been ceremonially unveiled and covered to the sound of a fanfare composed by Sebastian Szymański. The veil for the image of the Virgin Mary is a painting depicting the biblical scene of the Epiphany, alluding to the same dedication of the Łukawiec parish.
