= Sanctuary of Our Lady of Łukawiec =

- Kościół pw. NMP Królowej Polski w Łukawcu Sanktuarium Matki Bożej Łukawieckiej
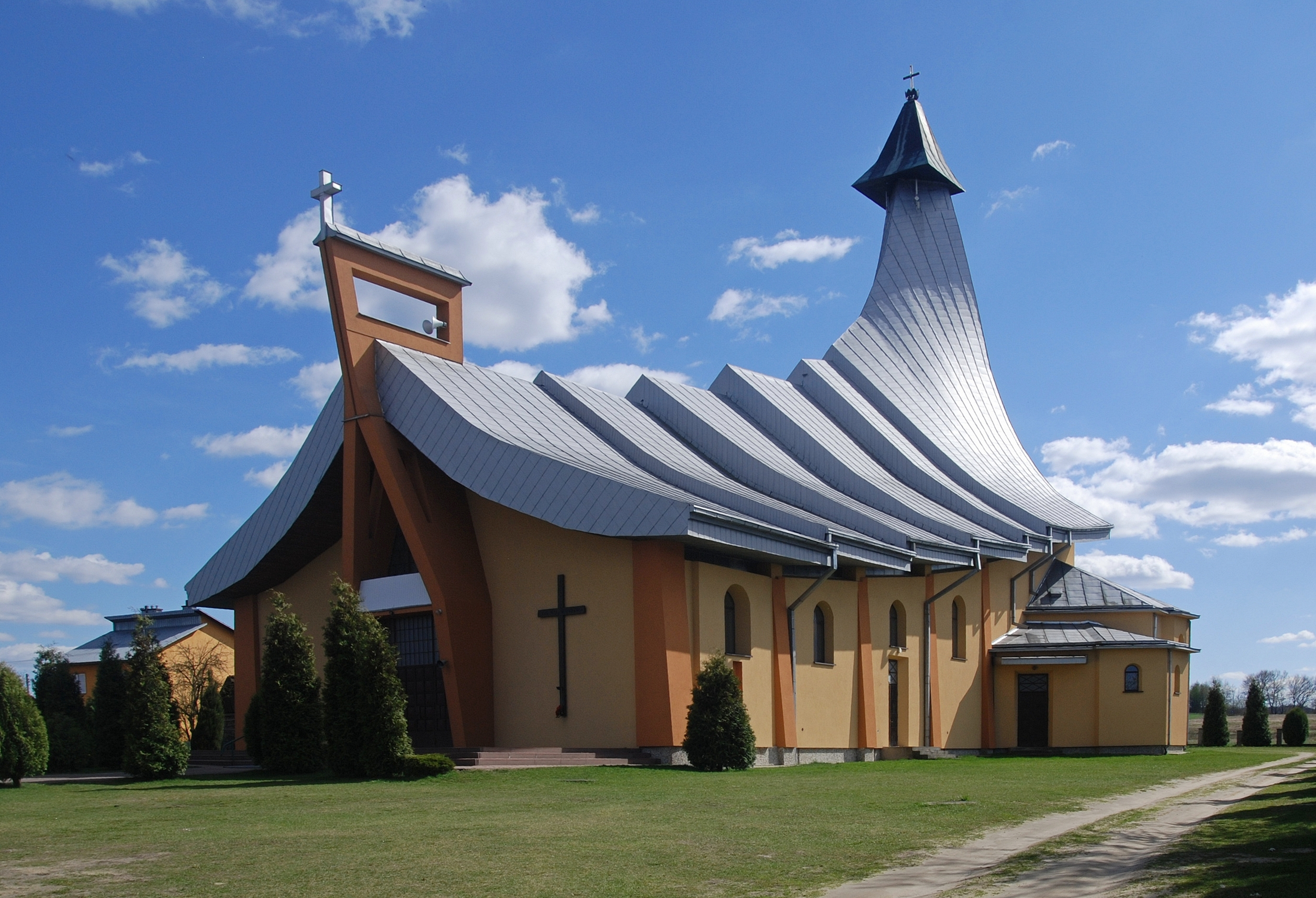
- Sanctuary of Our Lady of Łukawiec
- 50°04′29.89″N 23°07′05.74″E
- Location: Łukawiec
- Country: Poland

History
- Dedication: The Most Holy Virgin Mary, Queen of Poland
- Consecrated: 1990

Architecture
- Architect: Henryk Stawicki
- Years built: 1980-1989

The Most Holy Virgin Mary, Queen of Poland's Church (Polish: Kościół pw. NMP Królowej Polski), also known as Sanctuary of Our Lady of Łukawiec (Polish: Sanktuarium Matki Bożej Łukawieciej) is a Roman Catholic church, in the village Łukawiec, in the administrative district of Gmina Wielkie Oczy, within Lubaczów County, Subcarpathian Voivodeship, in south-eastern Poland. It was designed by Henryk Stawicki from Cracow and built between 1980 and 1989.

== History ==
The church is dedicated to Our Lady, Queen of Poland. The Painting of Our Lady of Łukawiec (earlier: Our Lady of Tartaków) from the 17th century is displayed on the main altar.

Previously, the Łukawiec parish church was the Three Wise Man Church. However, due to the arrival of more and more believers, a decision was made to build a new church, thanks to the efforts of priest Józef Kornaga. It was built in 1980-1989 according to the design of engineer Henryk Stawicki from Krakow. The church was consecrated by Bishop Marian Jaworski in 1990. The church is brick-built in a modern style. Its shape resembles a boat. In 1990, from the historic church of Epiphany, a miraculous Icon of Our Lady of Łukawiec (earlier: Our Lady of Tartaków) was moved to the new church and placed on the main altar. The church became the Sanctuary of Our Lady of Łukawiec. The altar is located in a triangular niche, narrowing towards the top, supposed to resemble rays descending from the Heaven. In the middle, there is a long, rectangular stained-glass window that reaches the roof. On the left side of the altar, there is a door to the sacristy, and on the right to the Chapel of St. John Paul II. On May 17, 2011, Bishop Wacław Depo dedicated the new elevation of the church and the presbytery.

In 2013, thanks to the efforts of Archbishop Mieczysław Mokrzycki, a chapel of John Paul II was made in the church. Archbishop Mieczysław Mokrzycki was the personal secretary of John Paul II. He made the dedication of the chapel. Thanks to him, in the chapel were the relics of the Pope, in the form of a strand of hair, which was placed in a kneeler, and in specially prepared cases, there were cassock, piuska, chasuble and chalice.

In 2016, on celebrations connected with the 25th anniversary of the coronation of the Miraculous Icon of Our Lady of Łukawiec by John Paul II, a new, huge main altar was made. The miraculous Icon of the Blessed Mother was placed there on June 6, 2016 after renovation. The consecration of the new altar was made by archbishop Mieczysław Mokrzycki who came from Łukawiec, during a solemn mass on June 8, 2016. The altar was designed by Bogusław Kulka and his wife. Masonry work was done by Jerzy Malarczyk and woodwork by Józef Majerczyk. Anita Kurasińska painted a picture referring to the parish's call - Epiphany. This painting is a veil for the Miraculous Icon of Our Lady of Łukawiec.
