= Kazimierz Landscape Park =

Protected area in Poland

Coordinates: 51.3264°N 21.9914°E

- Kazimierski Park Krajobrazowy
- IUCN category V (protected landscape/seascape)
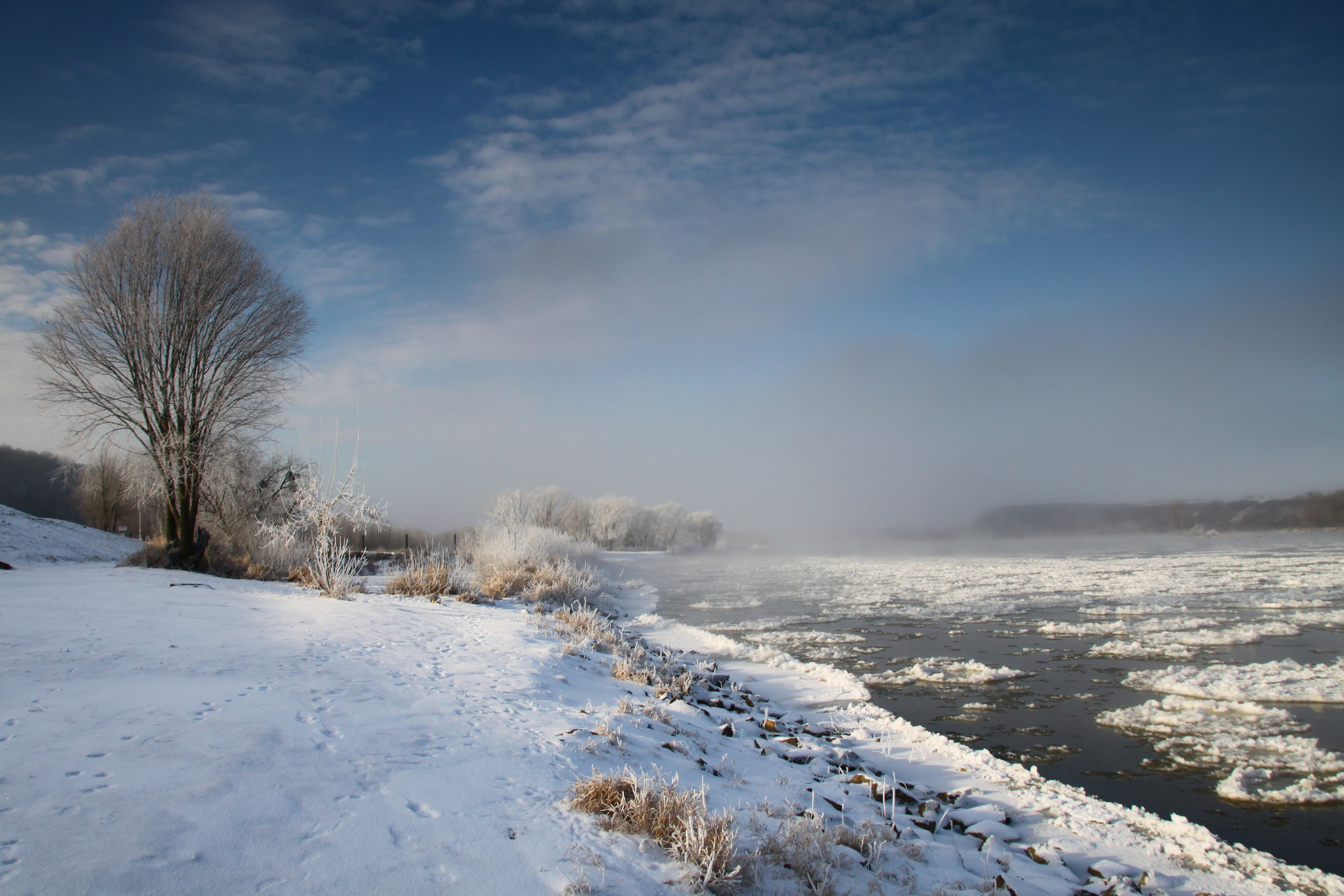
- Park in winter
- Interactive map of Kazimierz Landscape Park
- Location: Lublin Voivodeship
- Area: 136.70 km^{2} (52.78 sq mi)
- Established: 1979

Kazimierz Landscape Park (Kazimierski Park Krajobrazowy) is a protected area (Landscape Park) in eastern Poland. Established in 1979, Kazimierz covers an area of 136.70 square kilometres (52.78 sq mi) and includes two nature reserves. It lies within Lublin Voivodeship, in Puławy County (Gmina Kazimierz Dolny).

Unfortunately, it has been identified as having an "unstable natural balance".
