= Ignacy Potocki =

Polish nobleman & writer (1750–1809)

Count Roman Ignacy Potocki
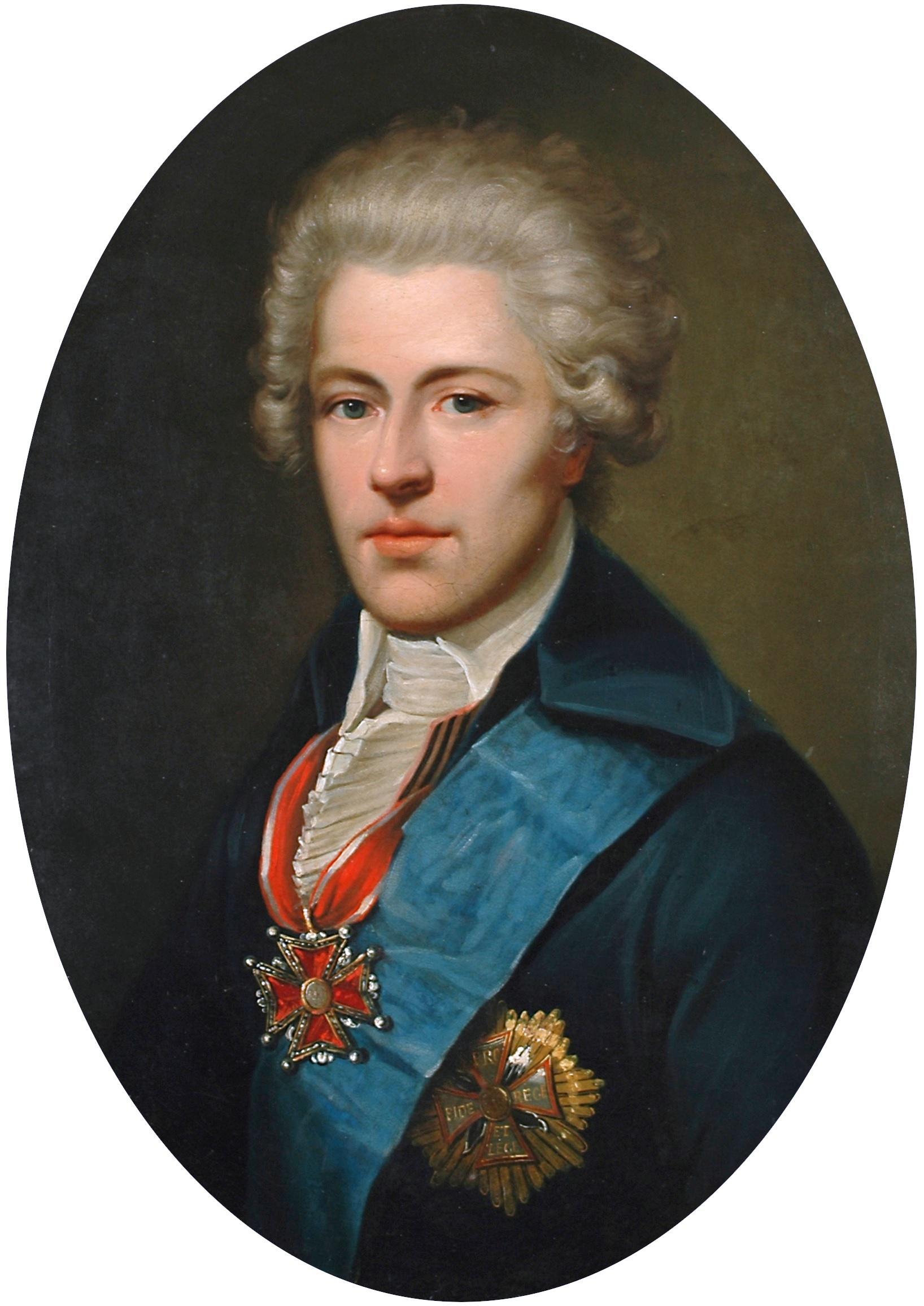
- Portrait attributed to Alexander Kucharsky
- Coat of arms: Clan Piława
- Born: 28 February 1750; Radzyń Podlaski, Poland
- Died: 30 August 1809 (aged 59); Vienna, Austria
- Noble family: Potocki
- Spouse: Elżbieta Lubomirska
- Issue: Krystyna Potocka
- Father: Eustachy Potocki
- Mother: Marianna Kątska

Roman Ignacy Potocki, generally known as Ignacy Potocki (Polish pronunciation: [iɡˈnatsɨ pɔˈtɔtskʲi]; 1750–1809), was a Polish nobleman, member of the influential magnate Potocki family, owner of Klementowice and Olesin (near Kurów), a politician, statesman, writer, and office holder. He was the Marshal of the Permanent Council (Rada Nieustająca) in 1778–1782, Grand Clerk of Lithuania from 1773, Court Marshal of Lithuania from 1783, Grand Marshal of Lithuania from 16 April 1791 to 1794. He was not a count. He has sometimes been confused with Ignacy Michal Potocki (1830-1917), who had a count title. In contrast to princely titles, count titles were not granted under Polish law.

He was an educational activist, member of the Commission of National Education and the initiator and president of Society for Elementary Textbooks. He was an opponent of King Stanisław II August in the 1770s and 1780s, and a major figure in the Polish politics of that era. During the Great Sejm, he was a leader of the Patriotic Party and the reform movement and eventually backed the King in many reform projects. An advocate of a pro-Prussian orientation, he helped conclude an alliance with Prussia in 1790. He co-authored the Constitution of 3 May 1791.

== Life ==
=== Youth ===
Potocki was born in Radzyń on 28 February 1750 into the influential magnate Potocki family. He was the son of Eustachy Potocki and Marianna Kątska, brother of Jerzy Michał Potocki, Jan Nepomucen Eryk Potocki and Stanisław Kostka Potocki.

Potocki was an alumnus of the Collegium Nobilium in Warsaw, where he was a student in the years 1761–1765. From 1765, he studied theology and law in Rome, where he attended the Collegium Nazarenum, up to about 1769. His parents intended for him to join the ranks of clergy, but he refused to follow this path. After traveling through Italy and Germany, he returned to Poland around 1771. On 27 December 1772 he married Elżbieta Lubomirska. This marriage brought him close to the political faction of Familia. Early on, Potocki made a major impression on many of his contemporaries, being groomed as the next leader of Familia. From 1772 he was invited to the King Stanisław II Augustus' Thursday Dinners.

=== Political career ===
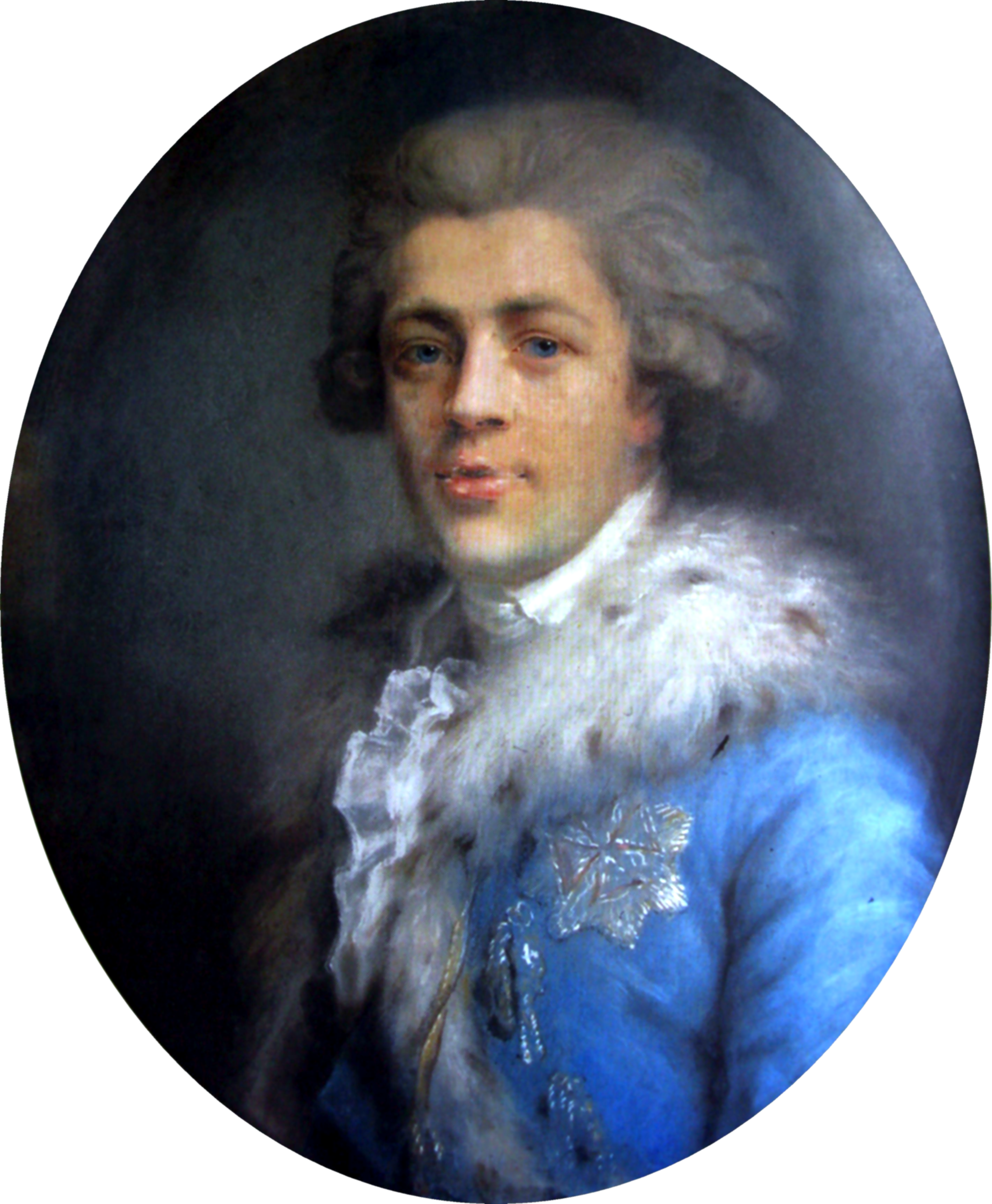
Ignacy Potocki by Anna Rajecka

As a member (1772–1791) of Poland's Commission of National Education (Komisja Edukacji Narodowej) – the world's first ministry of education – he was the initiator of and presided over the Society for Elementary Textbooks (Towarzystwo do Ksiąg Elementarnych, founded in 1775). He presided over the renovation of the Załuski's Library (in 1774). He was involved in the development of numerous projects, such as the history curriculum. In 1781 he reviewed and endorsed Hugo Kołłątaj's work at the Cracow Academy. His involvement with the educational projects earned him a nickname bakałarz (holder of baccalarius degree, teacher). His involvement with the educational reforms lessened only during the era of the Great Sejm (1788–1792), when he became increasingly involved with the wider reform program.

On 29 May 1773, he received the office of Great Clerk (Writer) of Lithuania, a relatively low-ranked position that was seen by some as below the magnates of the Potocki family. He participated in the Partition Sejm of 1773, where he sat on several commissions. Seeing himself in opposition to the king, he refused a seat on the Permanent Council that he was offered in March 1774. The king tried to appease him with the Order of Saint Stanislaus on 14 July that year, but that failed to bring Potocki to his side. Instead, Potocki became, for the next decade and half, one of his chief political critics and opponents; in 1776 he went to Moscow to argue, unsuccessfully, for limiting the power of king and the Russian ambassador, Otto Magnus von Stackelberg. Later that year, his election to the Sejm was disputed, and the king and Stackelberg managed to block his election. In 1778 however, the growing rift between the king and Stackelberg allowed him to take, through political maneuvering, the chairmanship of the Permanent Council Marshal of the Sejm. That year he also became a Knight of the Order of the White Eagle.

In 1779, Potocki joined the freemasonry, and by 1780, he advanced to the head of a freemasonry lodge. He became de facto head of the "Familia", and of anti-royal opposition (succeeding its previous leader, Stanisław Lubomirski, upon his death in 1783). That year also saw the sudden death of his wife. During a trip to Italy and France, in absentia, the influence of the Familia resulted in his appointment to the office of the Court Marshal of Lithuania. He continued to oppose various royal projects at the Sejms of 1784 and 1786. In 1785, he lost some face for his involvement in the Dogrumowa affair, in which the king was falsely accused of an instigation of a poisoning attempt.

Disappointed with Russia's lack of support for any serious reforms in Poland, he shifted to favoring an alliance with the Kingdom of Prussia instead. Although this resulted in the split of the anti-royalist opposition, he was seen as the leader of opposition (the Patriotic Party) when the Great Sejm begun in 1788. After some initial political maneuvering, the issues of a closer relation with Prussia (that would eventually grow into the Polish-Prussian alliance) and a major reform of the government, both of which he was closely involved in, began accelerating in 1789. At first supportive, more of a republican form of government, political reality (such as royal faction victory at the elections of 1790) resulted in his acceptance of a more constitutional monarchy approach. In 1790, through the mediation of Scipione Piattoli, the king and Potocki begun drifting closer together, working on a draft document that would eventually become the 3 May 1791 constitution. Alongside Poniatowski, Kołłątaj and Piattoli, he is seen as one of the major authors of that document. He supported the quasi-coup d'état in which the constitution was passed on 3 May 1791.

On 17 May 1791, he resigned his position in the Commission of National Education to take an appointment (Minister of Police) in the newly created government, the Guard of Laws. From March 1792 he also held the position of Minister of War. During the War in the Defence of the Constitution in 1792, he went on an unsuccessful diplomatic mission to Berlin to request assistance from the Prussian government. On 4 July 1792, a sudden depression made him resign his ministerial positions. A vocal opponent of the Targowica Confederation and likely an author of an anonymous anti-Targowica brochure, he was specifically requested by the Russian government not to be involved in the negotiations; he also refused to join the Targowica Confederation, even after Poniatowski's accession to it.

=== Final years ===
Following the victory of the Targowica Confederation and the abrogation of the May 3rd Constitution, Potocki emigrated from the Polish–Lithuanian Commonwealth, settling in Leipzig. Together with Tadeusz Kościuszko, he proposed a plan for a French-Polish alliance of republics, that was however not met with much support in France. He co-authored a work with Hugo Kołłątaj, On the Adoption and Fall of the Polish Constitution of 3 May (O ustanowieniu i upadku Konstytucji Polskiej 3-go Maja, 1793).

Potocki participated in preparations for the Kościuszko Uprising of 1794. In early April, he left Leipzig and arrived in Kraków. He was involved in unsuccessful diplomatic negotiations with various foreign powers in a vain attempt to gain support for the insurgents. During the Uprising he served as a member of the Supreme National Council (Rada Najwyższa Narodowa), as a chief of its diplomatic department. Upon suppression of the Uprising, instead of emigrating again, he took part in the surrender negotiations, which gained him respect in many quarters. Eventually, on 21 December 1794, he was imprisoned by the Tsarist Russian authorities. He has lost most of his wealth following the Uprising, as most of his estates were confiscated. Near the end of his life, he would be troubled by his inability to pay off debts from the 1780s.

Released in 1796, following the death of Catherine the Great, Potocki retired to Kurów, Puławy county (central Poland). There he devoted himself to historical studies, publishing several books, translations and commentaries. He also wrote poems, but those were never published during his lifetime. Historians still debate over his potential authorship of several anonymous works (primarily political brochures). He distanced himself from activists discussing a new insurrection, but was nonetheless arrested and imprisoned by the Austrian authorities again in the years 1798–1800. In 1801 he joined the Warsaw Scientific Society. He returned to politics shortly after much of Galicia was liberated by Napoleon and attached to the Duchy of Warsaw. During the negotiations with Napoleon in Dresden he contracted severe diarrhea and died on 30 August 1809. He was buried in Wilanów.

He had no direct descendants; his only surviving daughter, Krystyna (born 1778), died in 1800. His reduced estates were inherited by a nephew, Aleksander Potocki.

== Remembrance ==
In private life, he is said to have had a weakness for gambling, but he also had a reputation as an honest reformer who puts the good of the country above his own.

He is one of the figures immortalized in Jan Matejko's 1891 painting, Constitution of 3 May 1791.

== See also ==
- List of Poles
