= Nowodworski =

- Powiat nowodworski (disambiguation)

== Surname ==
- Adam Nowodworski (1572–1634) was a Roman Catholic Polish bishop.
- Michał Nowodworski (1831–1896) was a 19th-century Roman Catholic Bishop of Plock in Poland.

== See also ==
- Bartłomiej Nowodworski High School
- Nowodworski Foundation
- Wólka Nowodworska
- Valeriya Novodvorskaya
