= Kolonia Klementowice =

- Part of village
- Location within Poland
- Coordinates: 51°23′N 22°8′E
- Country: Poland
- Voivodeship: Lublin
- County: Puławy
- Gmina: Kurów

Kolonia Klementowice [kɔˈlɔɲa klɛmɛntɔˈvit͡sɛ] is a part of Klementowice in the administrative district of Gmina Kurów, within Puławy County, Lublin Voivodeship, in eastern Poland.
