= Góry Olesińskie =

- Part of village
- Location within Poland
- Coordinates: 51°22′N 22°11′E
- Country: Poland
- Voivodeship: Lublin
- County: Puławy
- Gmina: Kurów

Góry Olesińskie [ˈɡurɨ ɔlɛˈɕiɲskʲɛ] is a part of Płonki in the administrative district of Gmina Kurów, within Puławy County, Lublin Voivodeship, in eastern Poland.
