= Nasiłów =

- Village
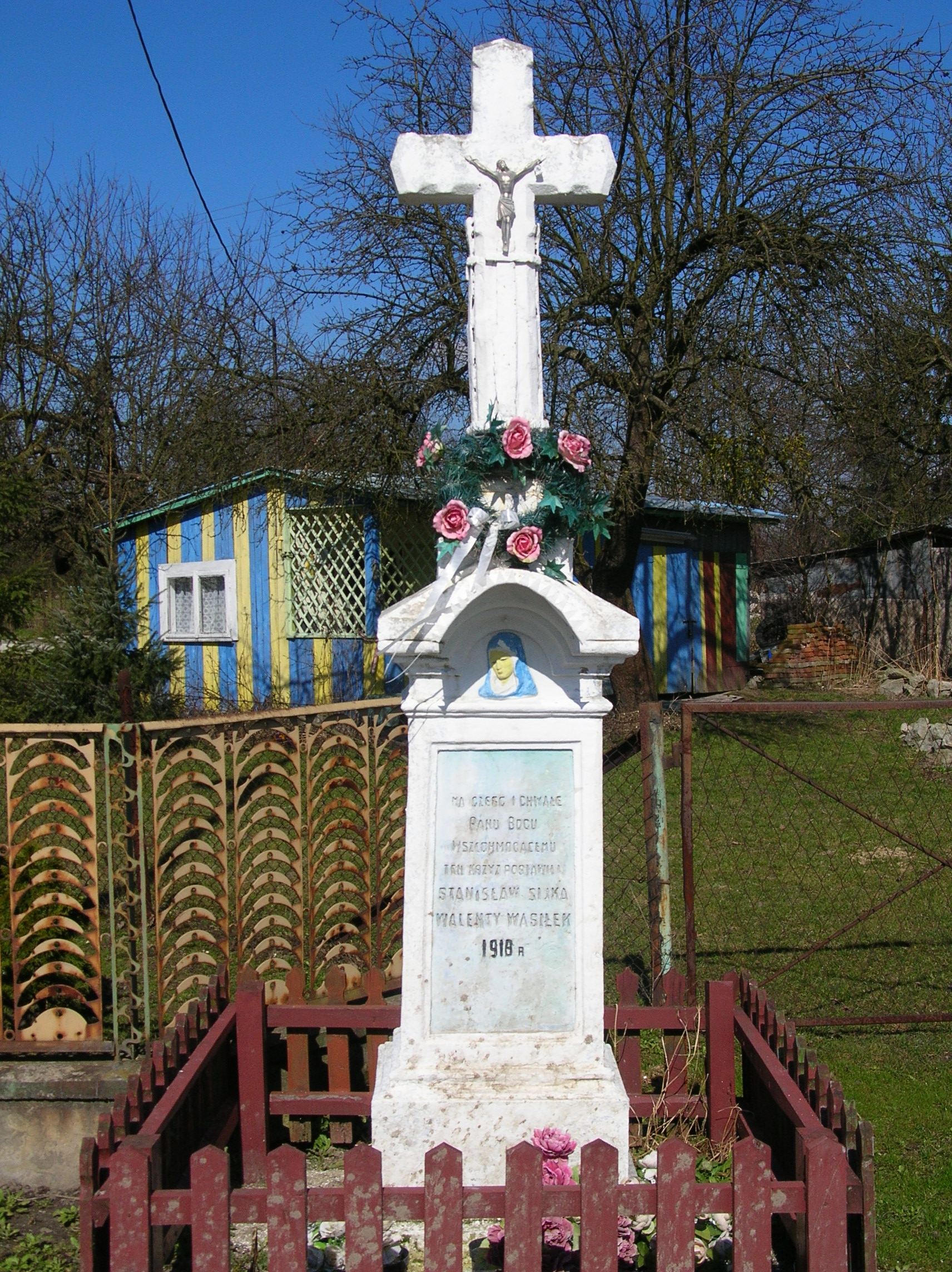
- Crucifix from 1918

- Location within Poland
- Coordinates: 51°20′N 21°57′E
- Country: Poland
- Voivodeship: Lublin
- County: Puławy
- Gmina: Janowiec
- Population: 350

Nasiłów [naˈɕiwuf] is a village in the administrative district of Gmina Janowiec, within Puławy County, Lublin Voivodeship, in eastern Poland.
