= Czołna =

- Village
- Location within Poland
- Coordinates: 51°33′N 22°10′E
- Country: Poland
- Voivodeship: Lublin
- County: Puławy
- Gmina: Baranów

Population
  - Total: 251

Czołna [ˈt͡ʂɔu̯na] is a village in the administrative district of Gmina Baranów, within Puławy County, Lublin Voivodeship, in eastern Poland.
