= Bronice-Kolonia =

- Village
- Location within Poland
- Coordinates: 51°20′41″N 22°11′43″E
- Country: Poland
- Voivodeship: Lublin
- County: Puławy
- Gmina: Nałęczów

Bronice-Kolonia [brɔˈnit͡sɛ kɔˈlɔɲa] is a village in the administrative district of Gmina Nałęczów, within Puławy County, Lublin Voivodeship, in eastern Poland.
