= Posiołek =

- Village
- Location within Poland
- Coordinates: 51°25′35″N 22°09′55″E
- Country: Poland
- Voivodeship: Lublin
- County: Puławy
- Gmina: Kurów
- Population: 24

Posiołek [pɔˈɕɔwɛk] is a village in the administrative district of Gmina Kurów, within Puławy County, Lublin Voivodeship, in eastern Poland.
