= Gródek, Puławy County =

Gródek
- Village
- Location within Poland
- Coordinates: 51°32′01″N 22°13′00″E
- Country: Poland
- Voivodeship: Lublin
- County: Puławy
- Gmina: Baranów

Gródek [ˈɡrudɛk] is a village in the administrative district of Gmina Baranów, within Puławy County, Lublin Voivodeship, in eastern Poland.
