= Zastawie, Puławy County =

Zastawie
- Village
- Location within Poland
- Coordinates: 51°25′21″N 22°13′47″E
- Country: Poland
- Voivodeship: Lublin
- County: Puławy
- Gmina: Kurów
- Population: 113

Zastawie [zasˈtavjɛ] is a village in the administrative district of Gmina Kurów, within Puławy County, Lublin Voivodeship, in eastern Poland.
