= Wygoda, Puławy County =

Wygoda
- Village
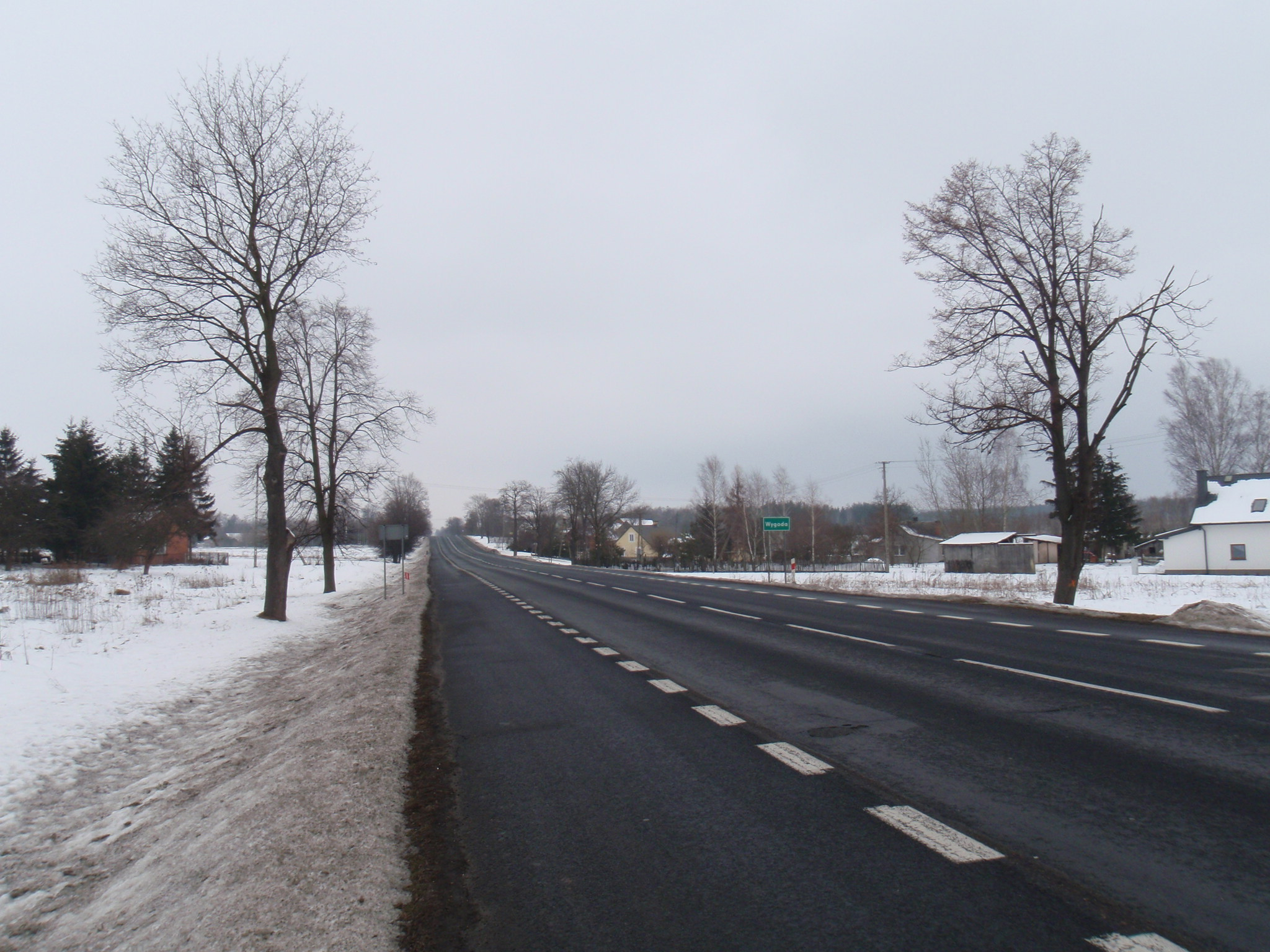

- Location within Poland
- Coordinates: 51°24′31″N 20°09′21″E
- Country: Poland
- Voivodeship: Lublin
- County: Puławy
- Gmina: Kurów

Wygoda [vɨˈɡɔda] is a village in the administrative district of Gmina Kurów, within Puławy County, Lublin Voivodeship, in eastern Poland.
