= Śniadówka =

- Village
- Location within Poland
- Coordinates: 51°31′N 22°11′E
- Country: Poland
- Voivodeship: Lublin
- County: Puławy
- Gmina: Baranów

Śniadówka [ɕɲaˈdufka] is a village in the administrative district of Gmina Baranów, within Puławy County, Lublin Voivodeship, in eastern Poland.
