= Marianka, Puławy County =

Marianka
- Village
- Location within Poland
- Coordinates: 51°27′11″N 22°12′31″E
- Country: Poland
- Voivodeship: Lublin
- County: Puławy
- Gmina: Kurów
- Population: 27

Marianka [maˈrjaŋka] is a village in the administrative district of Gmina Kurów, within Puławy County, Lublin Voivodeship, in eastern Poland.
