= Klin =

Klin may refer to:

Places

- Klin, Podlaskie Voivodeship, in northeastern Poland
- Klin, Lublin Voivodeship, in eastern Poland
- Klin Urban Settlement, a municipal formation which the Town of Klin in Klinsky District of Moscow Oblast, Russia is incorporated as
- Klin, Russia, several inhabited localities in Russia
- Klin, Námestovo District, Slovakia
- Klin (mountain), Slovakia

People

- Ami Klin, American autism expert

Other

- Klin (air base), an air base in Moscow Oblast, Russia
- Klin sub-machine gun, a Russian sub-machine gun
- KLIN, a radio station in Lincoln, Nebraska, United States

== See also ==
- Klina or Klinë, a city and municipality in the District of Peć in north-western Kosovo
- Kline (disambiguation)
- Klinsky (disambiguation)
