= Las-Grzęba =

- Village
- Location within Poland
- Coordinates: 51°29′07″N 22°05′00″E
- Country: Poland
- Voivodeship: Lublin
- County: Puławy
- Gmina: Żyrzyn

Las-Grzęba [ˈlas ˈɡʐɛmba] is a village in the administrative district of Gmina Żyrzyn, within Puławy County, Lublin Voivodeship, in eastern Poland.
