= Klinsky =

Klinsky (masculine), Klinskaya (feminine), or Klinskoye (neuter) may refer to:

- Klinsky District, a district of Moscow Oblast, Russia
- Klinsky (rural locality) (Klinskaya, Klinskoye), several rural localities in Russia
- Klinskoye, a Russian brand of beer by AB InBev

Klinski -

== See also ==
- Klin (disambiguation)
