= Łysa Góra, Puławy County =

Łysa Góra
- Village
- Location within Poland
- Coordinates: 51°30′39″N 22°07′44″E
- Country: Poland
- Voivodeship: Lublin
- County: Puławy
- Gmina: Baranów

Łysa Góra [ˈwɨsa ˈɡura] is a village in the administrative district of Gmina Baranów, within Puławy County, Lublin Voivodeship, in eastern Poland.
