= Drzewce, Lublin Voivodeship =

Drzewce
- Village
- Location within Poland
- Coordinates: 51°20′N 22°12′E
- Country: Poland
- Voivodeship: Lublin
- County: Puławy
- Gmina: Nałęczów

Population
  - Total: 600
- Time zone: UTC+1 (CET)
  - Summer (DST): UTC+2 (CEST)

Drzewce [ˈdʐɛft͡sɛ] is a village in the administrative district of Gmina Nałęczów, within Puławy County, Lublin Voivodeship, in eastern Poland.

== History ==
Five Polish citizens were murdered by Nazi Germany in the village during World War II.
