= Bartłomiejowice, Lublin Voivodeship =

Bartłomiejowice
- Village
- Location within Poland
- Coordinates: 51°19′N 22°7′E
- Country: Poland
- Voivodeship: Lublin
- County: Puławy
- Gmina: Wąwolnica
- Population (approx.): 180

Bartłomiejowice [bartwɔmjɛjɔˈvit͡sɛ] is a village in the administrative district of Gmina Wąwolnica, within Puławy County, Lublin Voivodeship, in eastern Poland.
