= Ludwinów, Puławy County =

Ludwinów
- Village
- Location within Poland
- Coordinates: 51°19′06″N 22°15′49″E
- Country: Poland
- Voivodeship: Lublin
- County: Puławy
- Gmina: Nałęczów

Ludwinów [ludˈvinuf] is a village in the administrative district of Gmina Nałęczów, within Puławy County, Lublin Voivodeship, in eastern Poland.
