= Oblasy, Lublin Voivodeship =

Oblasy
- Village
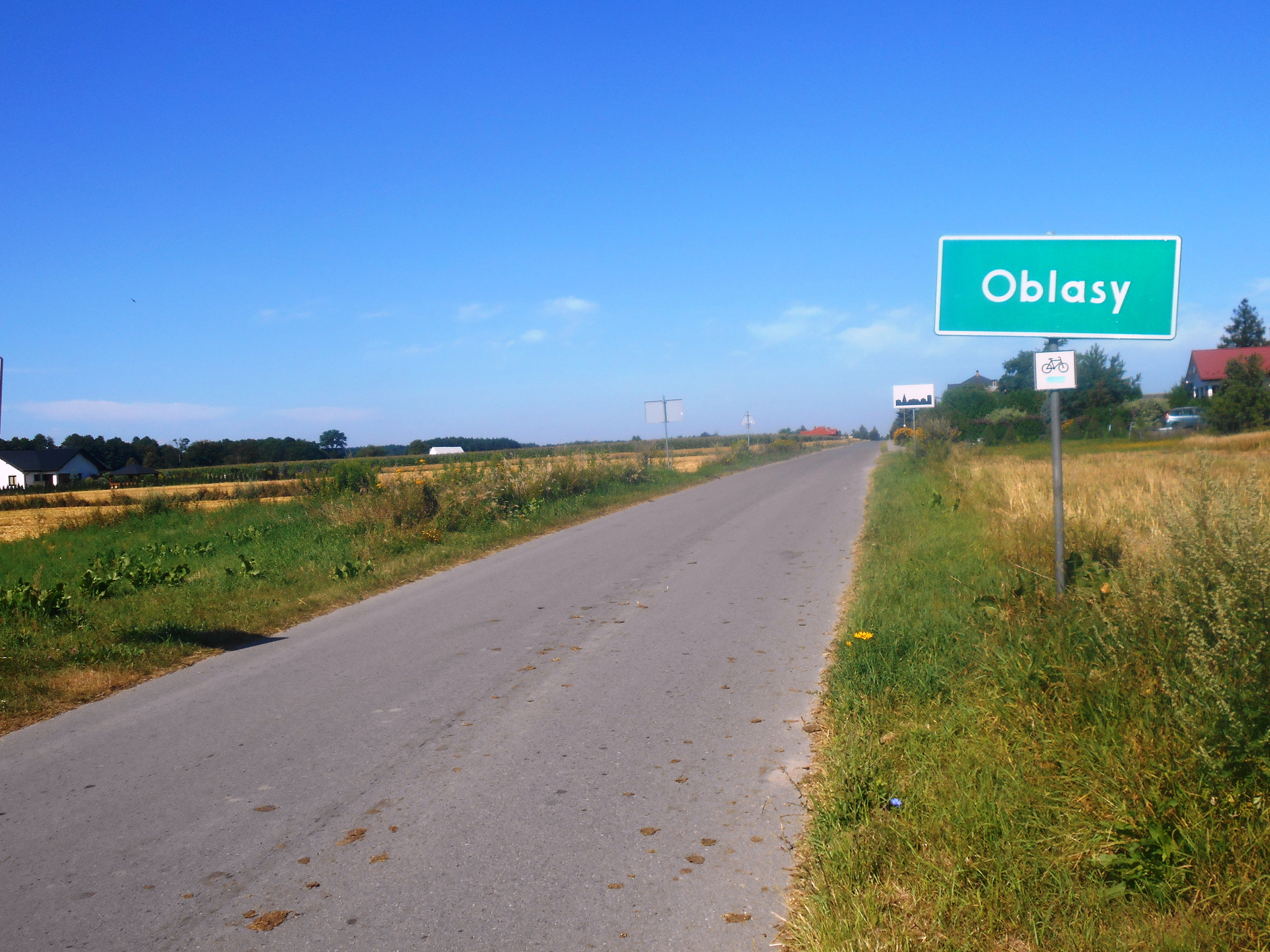

- Location within Poland
- Coordinates: 51°20′13″N 21°53′59″E
- Country: Poland
- Voivodeship: Lublin
- County: Puławy
- Gmina: Janowiec

Oblasy [ɔˈblasɨ] is a village in the administrative district of Gmina Janowiec, within Puławy County, Lublin Voivodeship, in eastern Poland.
