= Podbórz =

Podbórz may refer to the following places in Poland:

- Podbórz, Lublin Voivodeship
- Podbórz, West Pomeranian Voivodeship
- Podbórz, Szczecin
