= Zagóźdź =

- Village
- Location within Poland
- Coordinates: 51°33′52″N 22°13′12″E
- Country: Poland
- Voivodeship: Lublin
- County: Puławy
- Gmina: Baranów

Zagóźdź [ˈzaɡuɕt͡ɕ] is a village in the administrative district of Gmina Baranów, within Puławy County, Lublin Voivodeship, in eastern Poland.
