= Łąkoć =

Łąkoć may refer to the following places in Poland:

- Łąkoć, Lublin Voivodeship (east Poland)
- Łąkoć, Pomeranian Voivodeship (north Poland)
