= Jaworów, Lublin Voivodeship =

Jaworów
- Village
- Location within Poland
- Coordinates: 51°32′N 22°3′E
- Country: Poland
- Voivodeship: Lublin
- County: Puławy
- Gmina: Żyrzyn

Jaworów [jaˈvɔruf] is a village in the administrative district of Gmina Żyrzyn, within Puławy County, Lublin Voivodeship, in eastern Poland.
