= Sadurki, Lublin Voivodeship =

Sadurki
- Village
- Location within Poland
- Coordinates: 51°17′N 22°17′E
- Country: Poland
- Voivodeship: Lublin
- County: Puławy
- Gmina: Nałęczów
- Elevation: 200 m (660 ft)

Sadurki [saˈdurki] is a village in the administrative district of Gmina Nałęczów, within Puławy County, Lublin Voivodeship, in eastern Poland.
