= Piotrowice, Puławy County =

Piotrowice
- Village
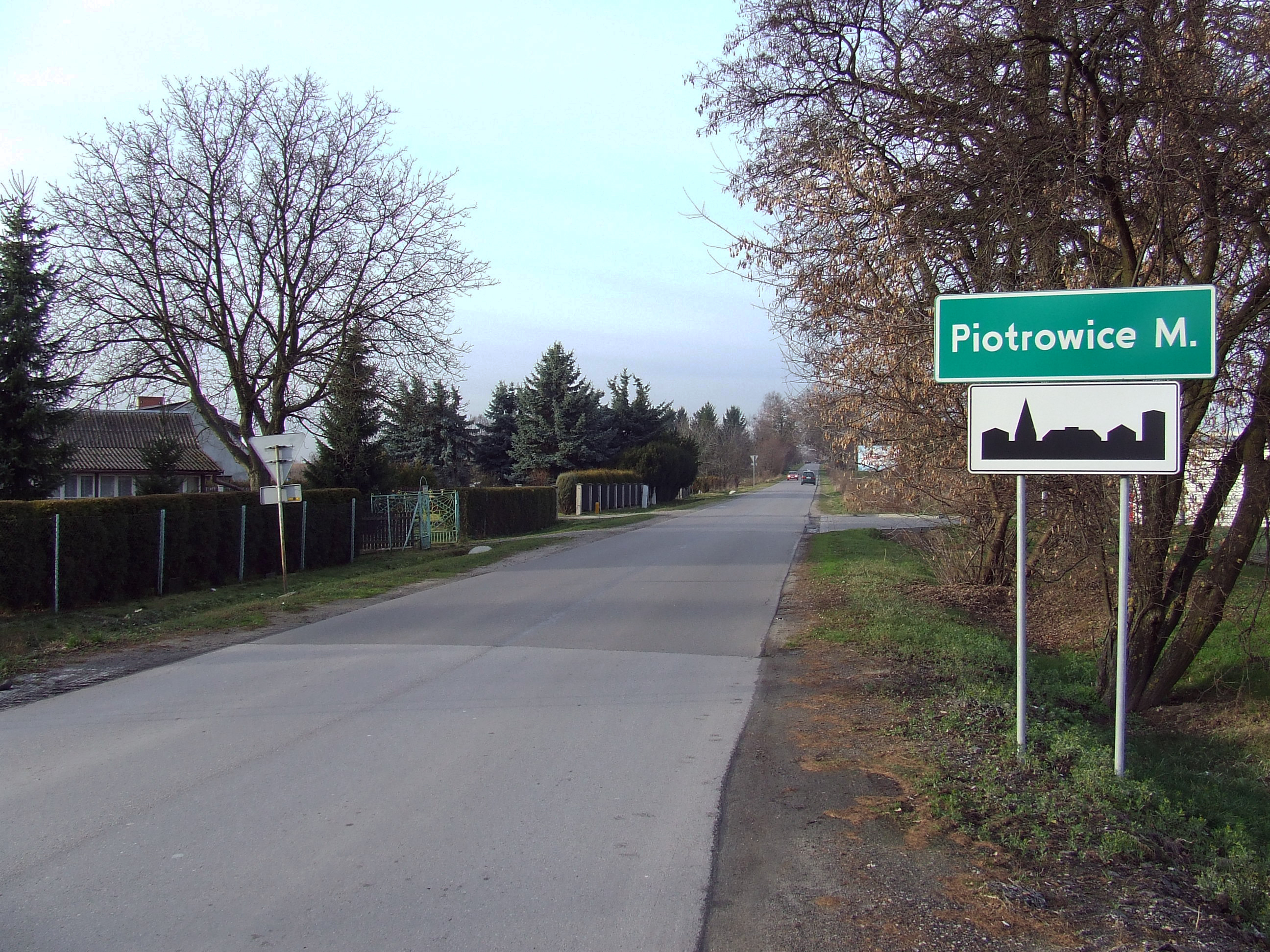
- Street and road sign of Piotrowice, Puławy County

- Location within Poland
- Coordinates: 51°18′39″N 22°14′15″E
- Country: Poland
- Voivodeship: Lublin
- County: Puławy
- Gmina: Nałęczów

Piotrowice [pjɔtrɔˈvit͡sɛ] is a village in the administrative district of Gmina Nałęczów, within Puławy County, Lublin Voivodeship, in eastern Poland.
