= Mała Dęba =

- Village
- Location within Poland
- Coordinates: 51°26′17″N 22°10′43″E
- Country: Poland
- Voivodeship: Lublin
- County: Puławy
- Gmina: Kurów

Mała Dęba [ˈmawa ˈdɛmba] is a village in the administrative district of Gmina Kurów, within Puławy County, Lublin Voivodeship, in eastern Poland.
