= Płonki =

- Village
- Location within Poland
- Coordinates: 51°23′N 22°12′E
- Country: Poland
- Voivodeship: Lublin
- County: Puławy
- Gmina: Kurów
- Population: 795

Płonki [ˈpwɔŋki] is a village in the administrative district of Gmina Kurów, within Puławy County, Lublin Voivodeship, in eastern Poland. It is located approximately 3 km (2 mi) south-east of Kurów, 17 km (11 mi) east of Puławy, and 30 km (19 mi) north-west of the regional capital Lublin.
