= Strzyżowice, Lublin Voivodeship =

Strzyżowice
- Village
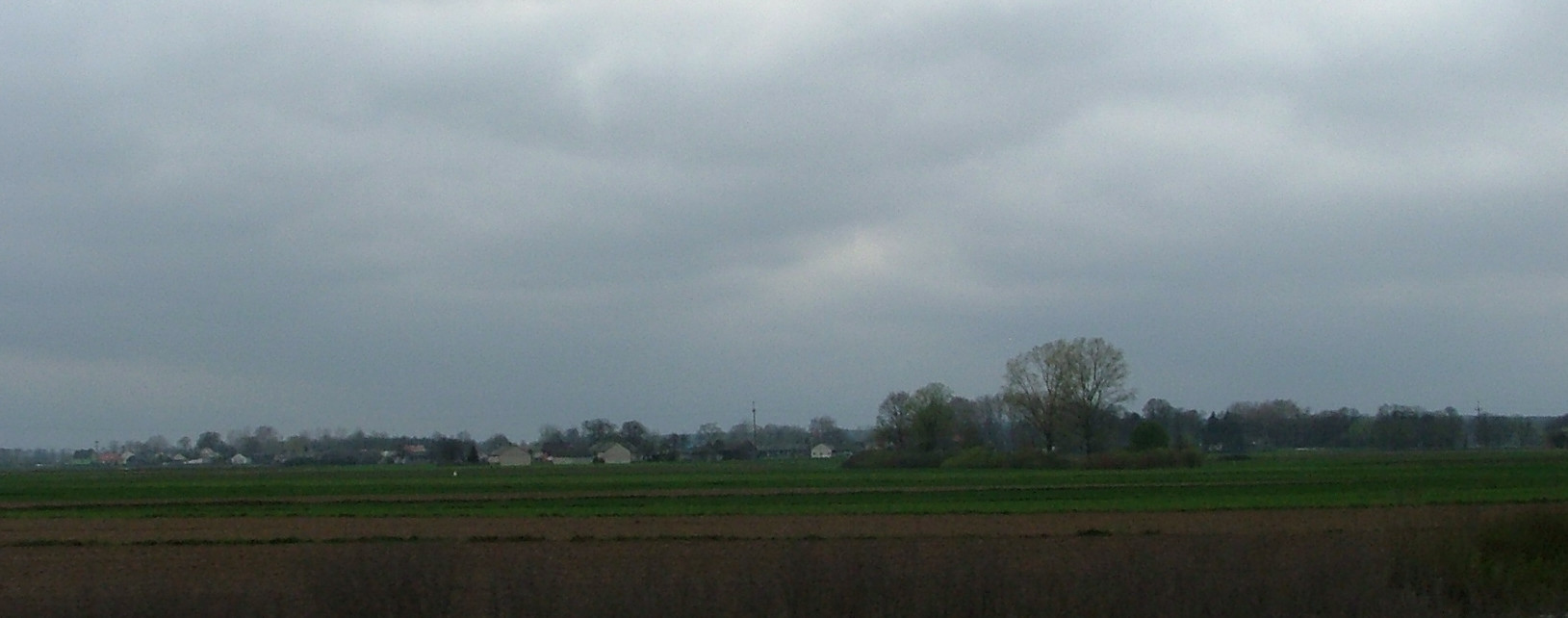

- Location within Poland
- Coordinates: 51°34′16″N 22°0′49″E
- Country: Poland
- Voivodeship: Lublin
- County: Puławy
- Gmina: Żyrzyn

Strzyżowice [stʂɨʐɔˈvit͡sɛ] is a village in the administrative district of Gmina Żyrzyn, within Puławy County, Lublin Voivodeship, in eastern Poland.
