= Zawada, Puławy County =

Zawada
- Village
- Location within Poland
- Coordinates: 51°18′45″N 22°6′14″E
- Country: Poland
- Voivodeship: Lublin
- County: Puławy
- Gmina: Wąwolnica

Zawada [zaˈvada] is a village in the administrative district of Gmina Wąwolnica, within Puławy County, Lublin Voivodeship, in eastern Poland.
