= Bronice =

Bronice may refer to the following places in Poland:

- Bronice, Lublin Voivodeship (north-west Poland)
- Bronice, Lubusz Voivodeship (western Poland)
