= Karmanowice =

- Village
- Location within Poland
- Coordinates: 51°21′N 22°7′E
- Country: Poland
- Voivodeship: Lublin
- County: Puławy
- Gmina: Wąwolnica

Karmanowice [karmanɔˈvit͡sɛ] is a village in the administrative district of Gmina Wąwolnica, within Puławy County, Lublin Voivodeship, in eastern Poland.
