= Pogonów, Lublin Voivodeship =

Pogonów
- Village
- Location within Poland
- Coordinates: 51°33′N 22°6′E
- Country: Poland
- Voivodeship: Lublin
- County: Puławy
- Gmina: Baranów

Pogonów [pɔˈɡɔnuf] is a village in the administrative district of Gmina Baranów, within Puławy County, Lublin Voivodeship, in eastern Poland.
