= Drzewce-Kolonia, Lublin Voivodeship =

Drzewce-Kolonia
- Village
- Location within Poland
- Coordinates: 51°19′32″N 22°10′48″E
- Country: Poland
- Voivodeship: Lublin
- County: Puławy
- Gmina: Nałęczów

Drzewce-Kolonia [ˈdʐɛft͡sɛ kɔˈlɔɲa] is a village in the administrative district of Gmina Nałęczów, within Puławy County, Lublin Voivodeship, in eastern Poland.
