= Paluchów =

- Village
- Location within Poland
- Coordinates: 51°27′03″N 22°11′02″E
- Country: Poland
- Voivodeship: Lublin
- County: Puławy
- Gmina: Kurów

Paluchów [paˈluxuf] is a village in the administrative district of Gmina Kurów, within Puławy County, Lublin Voivodeship, in eastern Poland.
