= Chruszczów-Kolonia =

- Village
- Location within Poland
- Coordinates: 51°17′20″N 22°11′40″E
- Country: Poland
- Voivodeship: Lublin
- County: Puławy
- Gmina: Nałęczów

Chruszczów-Kolonia [ˈxruʂt͡ʂuf kɔˈlɔɲa] is a village in the administrative district of Gmina Nałęczów, within Puławy County, Lublin Voivodeship, in eastern Poland.
