= Brzozowa Gać =

- Village
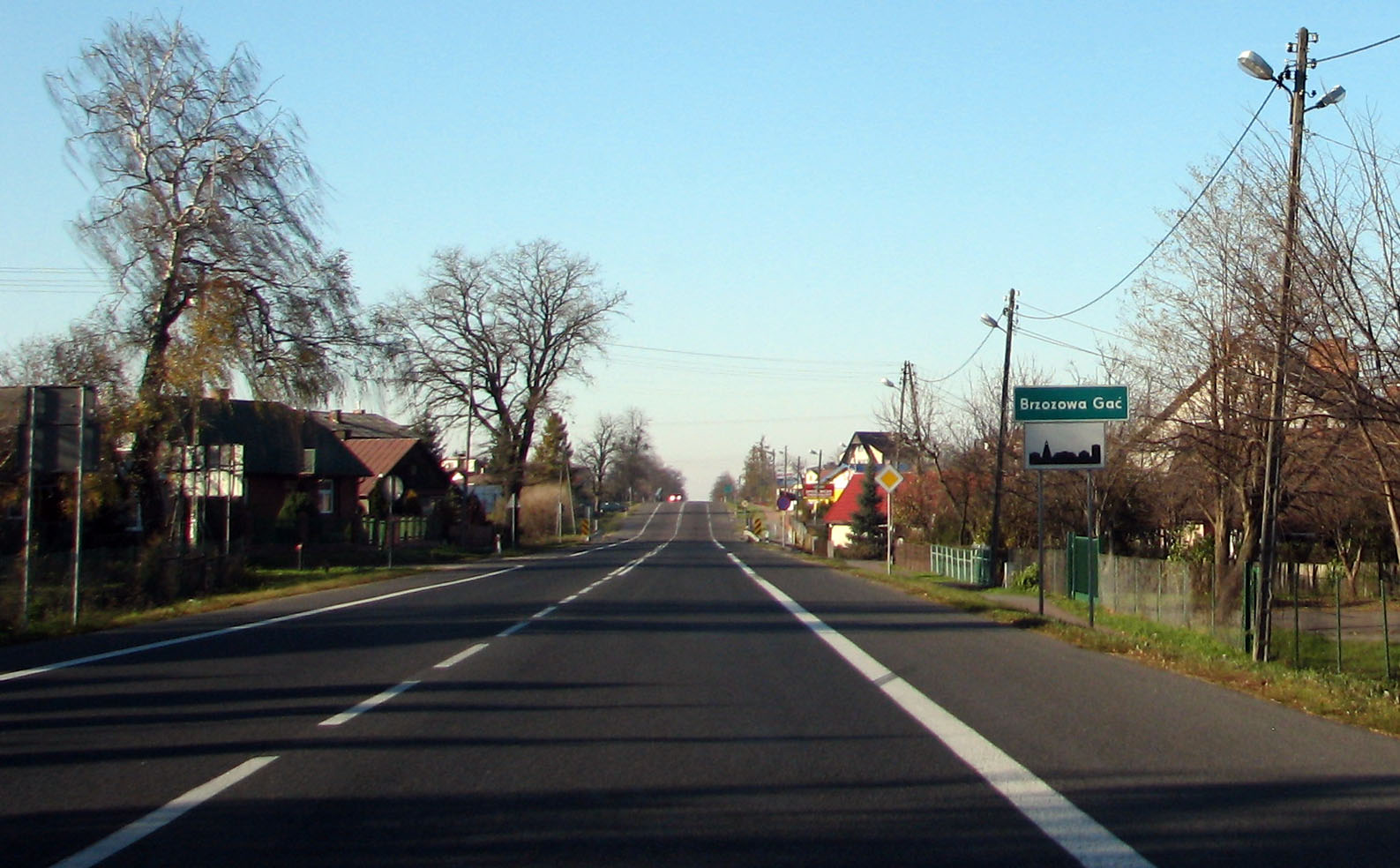

- Location within Poland
- Coordinates: 51°24′N 22°11′E
- Country: Poland
- Voivodeship: Lublin
- County: Puławy
- Gmina: Kurów
- Elevation: 154 m (505 ft)
- Population: 580

Brzozowa Gać (Polish pronunciation: [bʐɔˈzɔva ˈɡat͡ɕ]) is a village in the administrative district of Gmina Kurów, within Puławy County, Lublin Voivodeship, in eastern Poland.
