= Brześce, Lublin Voivodeship =

Brześce
- Village
- Location within Poland
- Coordinates: 51°17′53″N 21°50′28″E
- Country: Poland
- Voivodeship: Lublin
- County: Puławy
- Gmina: Janowiec

Brześce [ˈbʐɛɕt͡sɛ] is a village in the administrative district of Gmina Janowiec, within Puławy County, Lublin Voivodeship, in eastern Poland.
