= Barłogi, Lublin Voivodeship =

Barłogi
- Village
- Location within Poland
- Coordinates: 51°25′32″N 22°11′54″E
- Country: Poland
- Voivodeship: Lublin
- County: Puławy
- Gmina: Kurów
- Elevation: 155 m (509 ft)
- Population: 140

Barłogi [barˈwɔɡi] is a village in the administrative district of Gmina Kurów, within Puławy County, Lublin Voivodeship, in eastern Poland.

Antoni Sułek, a professor of sociology of University of Warsaw, was born in Barłogi in 1945.
