= Dębczyna =

- Village
- Location within Poland
- Coordinates: 51°34′N 22°13′E
- Country: Poland
- Voivodeship: Lublin
- County: Puławy
- Gmina: Baranów

Population
  - Total: 63

Dębczyna [dɛmpˈt͡ʂɨna] is a village in the administrative district of Gmina Baranów, within Puławy County, Lublin Voivodeship, in eastern Poland.
