= Mała Kłoda =

- Village
- Location within Poland
- Coordinates: 51°24′36″N 22°12′22″E
- Country: Poland
- Voivodeship: Lublin
- County: Puławy
- Gmina: Kurów

Mała Kłoda [ˈmawa ˈkwɔda] is a village in the administrative district of Gmina Kurów, within Puławy County, Lublin Voivodeship, in eastern Poland.
