= Łopatki-Kolonia =

- Village
- Location within Poland
- Coordinates: 51°19′05″N 22°07′06″E
- Country: Poland
- Voivodeship: Lublin
- County: Puławy
- Gmina: Wąwolnica

Łopatki-Kolonia [wɔˈpatki kɔˈlɔɲa] is a village in the administrative district of Gmina Wąwolnica, within Puławy County, Lublin Voivodeship, in eastern Poland.
