= Szumów =

- Village
- Location within Poland
- Coordinates: 51°20′N 22°11′E
- Country: Poland
- Voivodeship: Lublin
- County: Puławy
- Gmina: Kurów
- Elevation: 150 m (490 ft)
- Population: 148

Szumów [ˈʂumuf] is a village in the administrative district of Gmina Kurów, within Puławy County, Lublin Voivodeship, in eastern Poland.
