= Zagrody, Puławy County =

Zagrody
- Village
- Location within Poland
- Coordinates: 51°29′N 22°7′E
- Country: Poland
- Voivodeship: Lublin
- County: Puławy
- Gmina: Żyrzyn

Zagrody [zaˈɡrɔdɨ] is a village in the administrative district of Gmina Żyrzyn, within Puławy County, Lublin Voivodeship, in eastern Poland.
