= Wojszyn, Lublin Voivodeship =

Wojszyn
- Village
- Location within Poland
- Coordinates: 51°21′N 21°56′E
- Country: Poland
- Voivodeship: Lublin
- County: Puławy
- Gmina: Janowiec
- Population: 640

Wojszyn [ˈvɔi̯ʂɨn] is a village in the administrative district of Gmina Janowiec, within Puławy County, Lublin Voivodeship, in eastern Poland.
