= Coat of arms of Kurów =

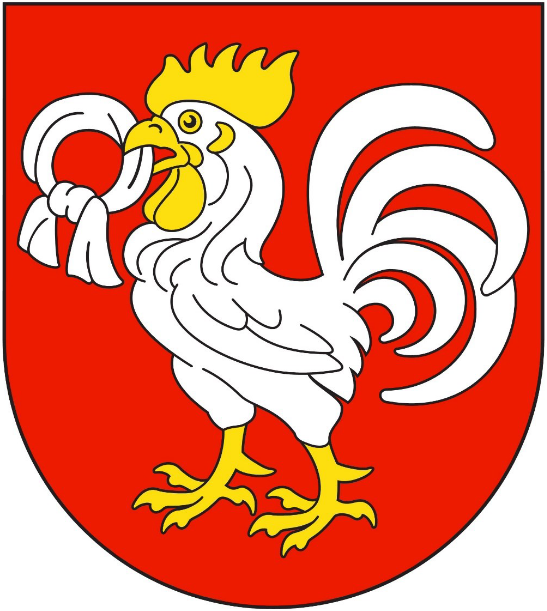
Official coat of arms of the Kurów commune

The coat of arms of Kurów and the Kurów municipality consists of a white cock with a gold crest, bill, talons and in its beak a white handkerchief in a red field.

== History ==
The first coat of arms of Kurów (from January 6, 1442) depicted the cock without the handkerchief (probably because the Polish surname Kurowski who was the owner of Kurów comes from the word kur, meaning "cock"). In 1464 the handkerchief was added to the coat of arms from the arms of the Zbąski family, who were the owners of Kurów from 1464 to 1683.

Former coat of arms (to 2021)

== See also ==
- Kur coat of arms

== Bibliography ==
- Marian Gumowski: Najstarsze Pieczęcie Miast Polskich. Toruń 1960
- Adam Boniecki: Herbarz Polski, vol XIII. Warszawa 1899
- Michał Baliński i Tymoteusz Lipiński: Starożytna Polska Pod Względem Historycznym Jeograficznym I Statystycznym, vol II p.1106. Warszawa 1845
