= Bałtów =

Bałtów can refer to two villages in Poland:

- Bałtów, Lublin Voivodeship (eastern Poland)
- Bałtów, Świętokrzyskie Voivodeship (southeastern Poland)
