= Sachalin, Lublin Voivodeship =

Sachalin
- Village
- Location within Poland
- Coordinates: 51°32′35″N 22°00′32″E
- Country: Poland
- Voivodeship: Lublin
- County: Puławy
- Gmina: Żyrzyn

Sachalin [saˈxalin] is a village in the administrative district of Gmina Żyrzyn, within Puławy County, Lublin Voivodeship, in eastern Poland.
