= Niwa, Puławy County =

Niwa
- Village
- Location within Poland
- Coordinates: 51°32′N 22°10′E
- Country: Poland
- Voivodeship: Lublin
- County: Puławy
- Gmina: Baranów

Niwa [ˈɲiva] is a village in the administrative district of Gmina Baranów, within Puławy County, Lublin Voivodeship, in eastern Poland.
