= Grabówki, Lublin Voivodeship =

Grabówki
- Village
- Location within Poland
- Coordinates: 51°17′45″N 22°04′23″E
- Country: Poland
- Voivodeship: Lublin
- County: Puławy
- Gmina: Wąwolnica

Grabówki [ɡraˈbufki] is a village in the administrative district of Gmina Wąwolnica, within Puławy County, Lublin Voivodeship, in eastern Poland.
