= Kolonia Płonki =

- Village
- Location within Poland
- Coordinates: 51°23′19″N 22°12′36″E
- Country: Poland
- Voivodeship: Lublin
- County: Puławy
- Gmina: Kurów

Kolonia Płonki [kɔˈlɔɲa ˈpwɔnki] is a village in the administrative district of Gmina Kurów, within Puławy County, Lublin Voivodeship, in eastern Poland.
