= Zgórzyńskie =

- Village
- Location within Poland
- Coordinates: 51°18′34″N 22°08′48″E
- Country: Poland
- Voivodeship: Lublin
- County: Puławy
- Gmina: Wąwolnica

Zgórzyńskie [zɡuˈʐɨɲskʲɛ] is a village in the administrative district of Gmina Wąwolnica, within Puławy County, Lublin Voivodeship, in eastern Poland.
