= Paulinów, Lublin Voivodeship =

Paulinów
- Village
- Location within Poland
- Coordinates: 51°20′N 22°15′E
- Country: Poland
- Voivodeship: Lublin
- County: Puławy
- Gmina: Nałęczów

Paulinów [pau̯ˈlinuf] is a village in the administrative district of Gmina Nałęczów, within Puławy County, Lublin Voivodeship, in eastern Poland.
