= Parafianka =

- Village
- Location within Poland
- Coordinates: 51°33′N 22°2′E
- Country: Poland
- Voivodeship: Lublin
- County: Puławy
- Gmina: Żyrzyn

Parafianka [paraˈfjaŋka] is a village in the administrative district of Gmina Żyrzyn, within Puławy County, Lublin Voivodeship, in eastern Poland.
