= Brześce-Kolonia =

- Village
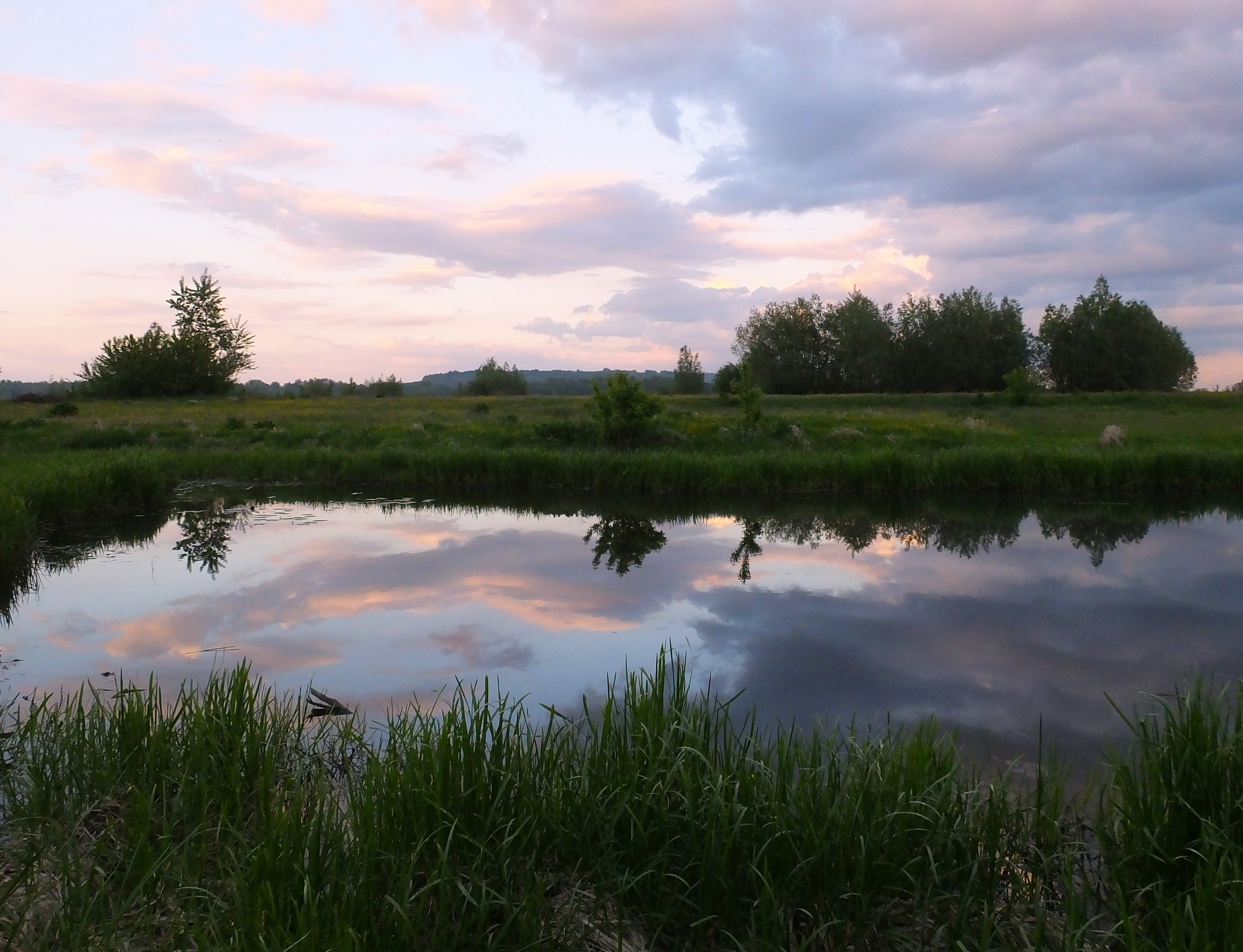
- The oxbow lake in Brześce

- Location within Poland
- Coordinates: 51°17′14″N 21°50′56″E
- Country: Poland
- Voivodeship: Lublin
- County: Puławy
- Gmina: Janowiec

Brześce-Kolonia [ˈbʐɛɕt͡sɛ kɔˈlɔɲa] is a village in the administrative district of Gmina Janowiec, within Puławy County, Lublin Voivodeship, in eastern Poland.
