= Motoga, Lublin Voivodeship =

Motoga
- Village
- Location within Poland
- Coordinates: 51°33′32″N 22°06′27″E
- Country: Poland
- Voivodeship: Lublin
- County: Puławy
- Gmina: Baranów

Population
  - Total: 42

Motoga [mɔˈtɔɡa] is a village in the administrative district of Gmina Baranów, within Puławy County, Lublin Voivodeship, in eastern Poland.
