= Trzcianki, Puławy County =

Trzcianki
- Village
- Location within Poland
- Coordinates: 51°23′N 21°55′E
- Country: Poland
- Voivodeship: Lublin
- County: Puławy
- Gmina: Janowiec

Trzcianki [ˈtʂt͡ɕaŋki] is a village in the administrative district of Gmina Janowiec, within Puławy County, Lublin Voivodeship, in eastern Poland.
