= Las-Jawor =

- Village
- Location within Poland
- Coordinates: 51°31′45″N 22°02′41″E
- Country: Poland
- Voivodeship: Lublin
- County: Puławy
- Gmina: Żyrzyn

Las-Jawor [ˈlas ˈjavɔr] is a village in the administrative district of Gmina Żyrzyn, within Puławy County, Lublin Voivodeship, in eastern Poland.
