= Kotliny, Lublin Voivodeship =

Kotliny
- Village
- Location within Poland
- Coordinates: 51°29′N 22°10′E
- Country: Poland
- Voivodeship: Lublin
- County: Puławy
- Gmina: Żyrzyn
- Time zone: UTC+1 (CET)
  - Summer (DST): UTC+2 (CEST)

Kotliny [kɔˈtlinɨ] is a village in the administrative district of Gmina Żyrzyn, within Puławy County, Lublin Voivodeship, in eastern Poland.

== History ==
Seven Polish citizens were murdered by Nazi Germany in the village during World War II.
