= Węgielnica, Lublin Voivodeship =

Węgielnica
- Village
- Location within Poland
- Coordinates: 51°26′12″N 22°10′03″E
- Country: Poland
- Voivodeship: Lublin
- County: Puławy
- Gmina: Kurów

Węgielnica [vɛŋɡʲɛlˈnit͡sa] is a village in the administrative district of Gmina Kurów, within Puławy County, Lublin Voivodeship, in eastern Poland.
