= Stanisławka, Puławy County =

Stanisławka
- Village
- Location within Poland
- Coordinates: 51°17′29″N 22°06′26″E
- Country: Poland
- Voivodeship: Lublin
- County: Puławy
- Gmina: Wąwolnica

Stanisławka [staniˈswafka] is a village in the administrative district of Gmina Wąwolnica, within Puławy County, Lublin Voivodeship, in eastern Poland.
