= Żerdź, Lublin Voivodeship =

Żerdź
- Village
- Location within Poland
- Coordinates: 51°31′N 22°4′E
- Country: Poland
- Voivodeship: Lublin
- County: Puławy
- Gmina: Żyrzyn

Żerdź [ʐɛrt͡ɕ] is a village in the administrative district of Gmina Żyrzyn, within Puławy County, Lublin Voivodeship, in eastern Poland.
