= Dęba, Lublin Voivodeship =

Dęba
- Village
- Location within Poland
- Coordinates: 51°26′28″N 22°10′19″E
- Country: Poland
- Voivodeship: Lublin
- County: Puławy
- Gmina: Kurów
- Elevation: 161 m (528 ft)
- Population: 258

Dęba [ˈdɛmba] is a village in the administrative district of Gmina Kurów, within Puławy County, Lublin Voivodeship, in eastern Poland.
