= Kłoda, Lublin Voivodeship =

Kłoda
- Village
- Location within Poland
- Coordinates: 51°24′54″N 22°13′14″E
- Country: Poland
- Voivodeship: Lublin
- County: Puławy
- Gmina: Kurów
- Population: 312

Kłoda [ˈkwɔda] is a village in the administrative district of Gmina Kurów, within Puławy County, Lublin Voivodeship, in eastern Poland.
