= Rąblów =

- Village
- Location within Poland
- Coordinates: 51°19′42″N 22°5′41″E
- Country: Poland
- Voivodeship: Lublin
- County: Puławy
- Gmina: Wąwolnica
- Population: 340

Rąblów [ˈrɔmbluf] is a village in the administrative district of Gmina Wąwolnica, within Puławy County, Lublin Voivodeship, in eastern Poland.
