= Zarzeka =

- Village
- Location within Poland
- Coordinates: 51°17′35″N 22°09′30″E
- Country: Poland
- Voivodeship: Lublin
- County: Puławy
- Gmina: Wąwolnica

Zarzeka [zaˈʐɛka] is a village in the administrative district of Gmina Wąwolnica, within Puławy County, Lublin Voivodeship, in eastern Poland.
