= Czesławice, Lublin Voivodeship =

Czesławice
- Village
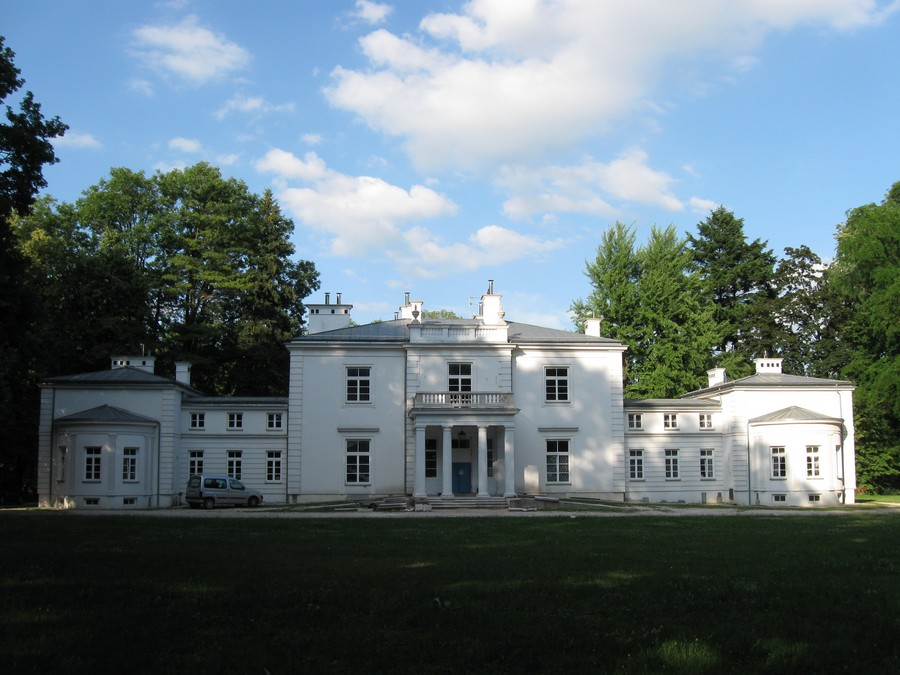
- Czesławice Palace

- Location within Poland
- Coordinates: 51°18′23″N 22°16′2″E
- Country: Poland
- Voivodeship: Lublin
- County: Puławy
- Gmina: Nałęczów
- Time zone: UTC+1 (CET)
  - Summer (DST): UTC+2 (CEST)
- Vehicle registration: LPU

Czesławice (Polish pronunciation: [t͡ʂɛswaˈvit͡sɛ]) is a village in the administrative district of Gmina Nałęczów, within Puławy County, Lublin Voivodeship, in eastern Poland.
