= Kośmin, Lublin Voivodeship =

Kośmin
- Village
- Location within Poland
- Coordinates: 51°35′N 22°0′E
- Country: Poland
- Voivodeship: Lublin
- County: Puławy
- Gmina: Żyrzyn
- Time zone: UTC+1 (CET)
  - Summer (DST): UTC+2 (CEST)

Kośmin [ˈkɔɕmin] is a village in the administrative district of Gmina Żyrzyn, within Puławy County, Lublin Voivodeship, in eastern Poland.

Polish writer Zofia Kossak-Szczucka was born here.

== History ==
Three Polish citizens were murdered by Nazi Germany in the village during World War II.
