= Choszczów =

- Village
- Location within Poland
- Coordinates: 51°28′N 22°12′E
- Country: Poland
- Voivodeship: Lublin
- County: Puławy
- Gmina: Kurów
- Population: 271

Choszczów [ˈxɔʂt͡ʂuf] is a village in the administrative district of Gmina Kurów, within Puławy County, Lublin Voivodeship, in eastern Poland.
