= Osiny, Puławy County =

Osiny
- Village
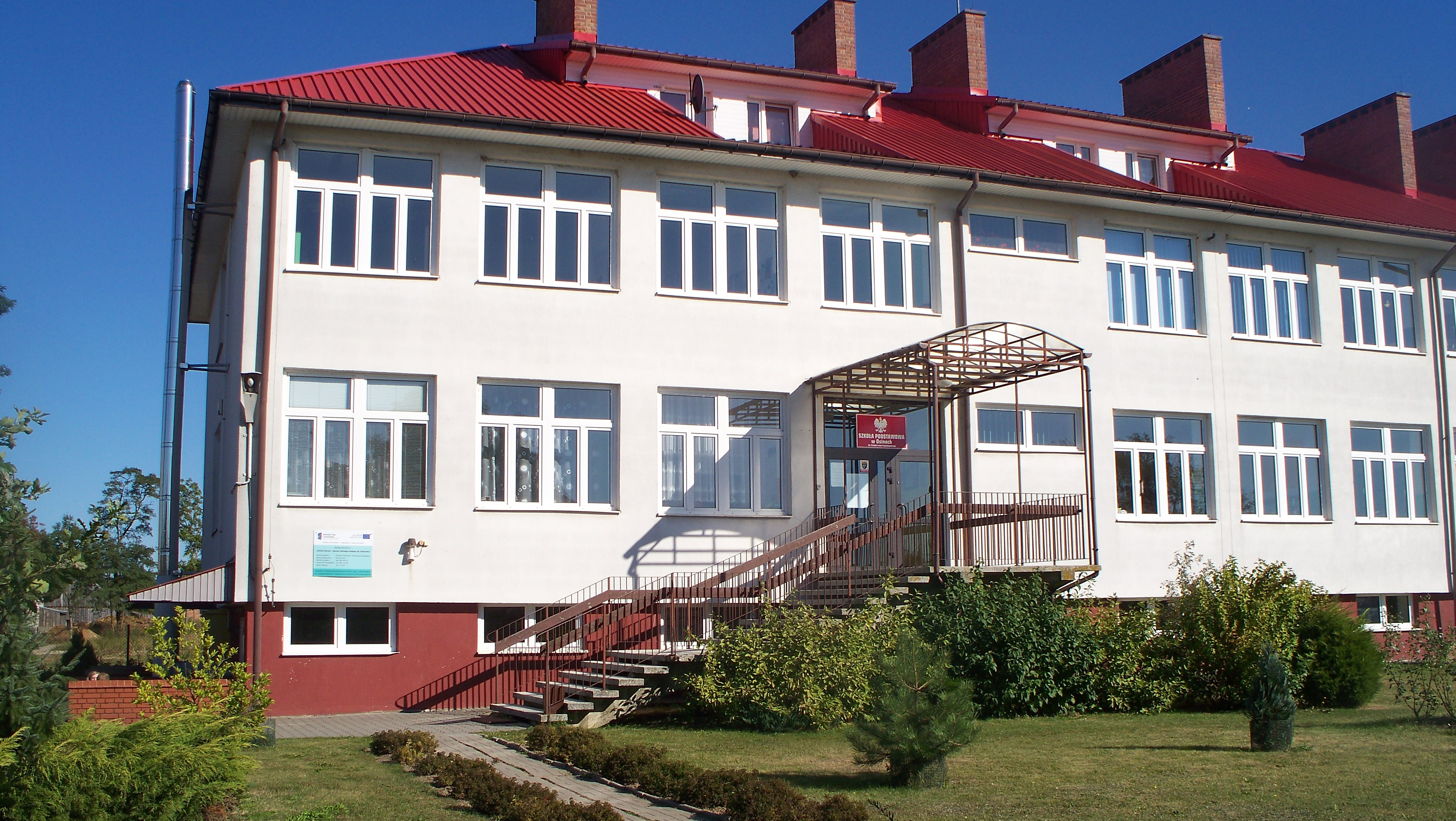
- Primary school in Osiny

- Location within Poland
- Coordinates: 51°28′N 22°4′E
- Country: Poland
- Voivodeship: Lublin
- County: Puławy
- Gmina: Żyrzyn

Population (approx.)
  - Total: 1,040
- Time zone: UTC+1 (CET)
  - Summer (DST): UTC+2 (CEST)
- Vehicle registration: LPU

Osiny [ɔˈɕinɨ] is a village in the administrative district of Gmina Żyrzyn, within Puławy County, Lublin Voivodeship, in eastern Poland.

== History ==
Six Polish citizens were murdered by Nazi Germany in the village during World War II.
