= Strzelce, Puławy County =

Strzelce
- Village
- Location within Poland
- Coordinates: 51°17′N 22°14′E
- Country: Poland
- Voivodeship: Lublin
- County: Puławy
- Gmina: Nałęczów

Strzelce [ˈstʂɛlt͡sɛ] is a village in the administrative district of Gmina Nałęczów, within Puławy County, Lublin Voivodeship, in eastern Poland.
