= Kalinówka, Puławy County =

Kalinówka
- Village
- Location within Poland
- Coordinates: 51°23′04″N 22°13′37″E
- Country: Poland
- Voivodeship: Lublin
- County: Puławy
- Gmina: Kurów

Kalinówka [kaliˈnufka] is a village in the administrative district of Gmina Kurów, within Puławy County, Lublin Voivodeship, in eastern Poland.
