= Bronisławka, Puławy County =

Bronisławka
- Village
- Location within Poland
- Coordinates: 51°28′N 22°12′E
- Country: Poland
- Voivodeship: Lublin
- County: Puławy
- Gmina: Kurów
- Population: 211

Bronisławka [brɔniˈswafka] is a village in the administrative district of Gmina Kurów, within Puławy County, Lublin Voivodeship, in eastern Poland.
