= Bałtów, Lublin Voivodeship =

Bałtów
- Village
- Location within Poland
- Coordinates: 51°30′N 22°2′E
- Country: Poland
- Voivodeship: Lublin
- County: Puławy
- Gmina: Żyrzyn

Bałtów [ˈbau̯tuf] is a village in the administrative district of Gmina Żyrzyn, within Puławy County, Lublin Voivodeship, in eastern Poland, approximately 5 km (3 mi) west of Żyrzyn, 11 km (7 mi) northeast of Puławy and 47 km (29 mi) northwest of the regional capital Lublin.
