= Huta, Gmina Wąwolnica =

Huta
- Village
- Location within Poland
- Coordinates: 51°16′50″N 22°06′12″E
- Country: Poland
- Voivodeship: Lublin
- County: Puławy
- Gmina: Wąwolnica

Huta [ˈxuta] is a village in the administrative district of Gmina Wąwolnica, within Puławy County, Lublin Voivodeship, in eastern Poland.
