= Cynków, Lublin Voivodeship =

Cynków
- Village
- Location within Poland
- Coordinates: 51°18′N 22°15′E
- Country: Poland
- Voivodeship: Lublin
- County: Puławy
- Gmina: Nałęczów

Cynków [ˈt͡sɨnkuf] is a village in the administrative district of Gmina Nałęczów, within Puławy County, Lublin Voivodeship, in eastern Poland.
