= Bochotnica-Kolonia =

- Village
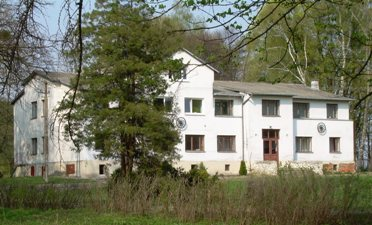

- Location within Poland
- Coordinates: 51°16′8″N 22°14′33″E
- Country: Poland
- Voivodeship: Lublin
- County: Puławy
- Gmina: Nałęczów

Bochotnica-Kolonia [bɔxɔtˈnit͡sa kɔˈlɔɲa] is a village in the administrative district of Gmina Nałęczów, within Puławy County, Lublin Voivodeship, in eastern Poland.
