= Janowice, Puławy County =

Janowice
- Village
- Location within Poland
- Coordinates: 51°18′49″N 21°51′04″E
- Country: Poland
- Voivodeship: Lublin
- County: Puławy
- Gmina: Janowiec

Janowice [janɔˈvit͡sɛ] is a village in the administrative district of Gmina Janowiec, within Puławy County, Lublin Voivodeship, in eastern Poland.
