= Borysów =

Borysów may refer to:

- Barysaw, Belarus - Borysów in Polish
- Borysów, Lublin Voivodeship (east Poland)
