= Kozioł, Lublin Voivodeship =

Kozioł
- Village
- Location within Poland
- Coordinates: 51°32′18″N 22°11′08″E
- Country: Poland
- Voivodeship: Lublin
- County: Puławy
- Gmina: Baranów

Kozioł [ˈkɔʑɔu̯] is a village in the administrative district of Gmina Baranów, within Puławy County, Lublin Voivodeship, in eastern Poland.
