= Antopol, Puławy County =

Antopol
- Village
- Location within Poland
- Coordinates: 51°16′36″N 22°15′33″E
- Country: Poland
- Voivodeship: Lublin
- County: Puławy
- Gmina: Nałęczów

Antopol [anˈtɔpɔl] is a village in the administrative district of Gmina Nałęczów, within Puławy County, Lublin Voivodeship, in eastern Poland.
