= Gmina Janowiec =

District in Lublin Voivodeship, Poland

Gmina Janowiec Janowiec Commune
- Gmina
- Coat of arms
- Interactive map of Gmina Janowiec
- Coordinates (Janowiec): 51°19′29″N 21°52′59″E
- Country: Poland
- Voivodeship: Lublin
- County: Puławy
- Seat: Janowiec

Area
  - Total: 79 km^{2} (31 sq mi)

Population (2015)
  - Total: 3,675
  - Density: 47/km^{2} (120/sq mi)
- Website: http://www.janowiec.com

Gmina Janowiec is a rural gmina (administrative district) in Puławy County, Lublin Voivodeship, in eastern Poland. Its seat is the village of Janowiec, which lies approximately 12 kilometres (7 mi) south-west of Puławy and 49 km (30 mi) west of the regional capital Lublin.

The gmina covers an area of 79 square kilometres (30.5 sq mi), and as of 2006 its total population is 3,594 (3,675 in 2015).

== Villages ==
Gmina Janowiec contains the villages and settlements of Brześce, Brześce-Kolonia, Janowice, Janowiec, Nasiłów, Oblasy, Trzcianki and Wojszyn.

== Neighbouring gminas ==
Gmina Janowiec is bordered by the town of Puławy and by the gminas of Kazimierz Dolny, Przyłęk, Puławy and Wilków.
