= Wólka Nowodworska =

- Village
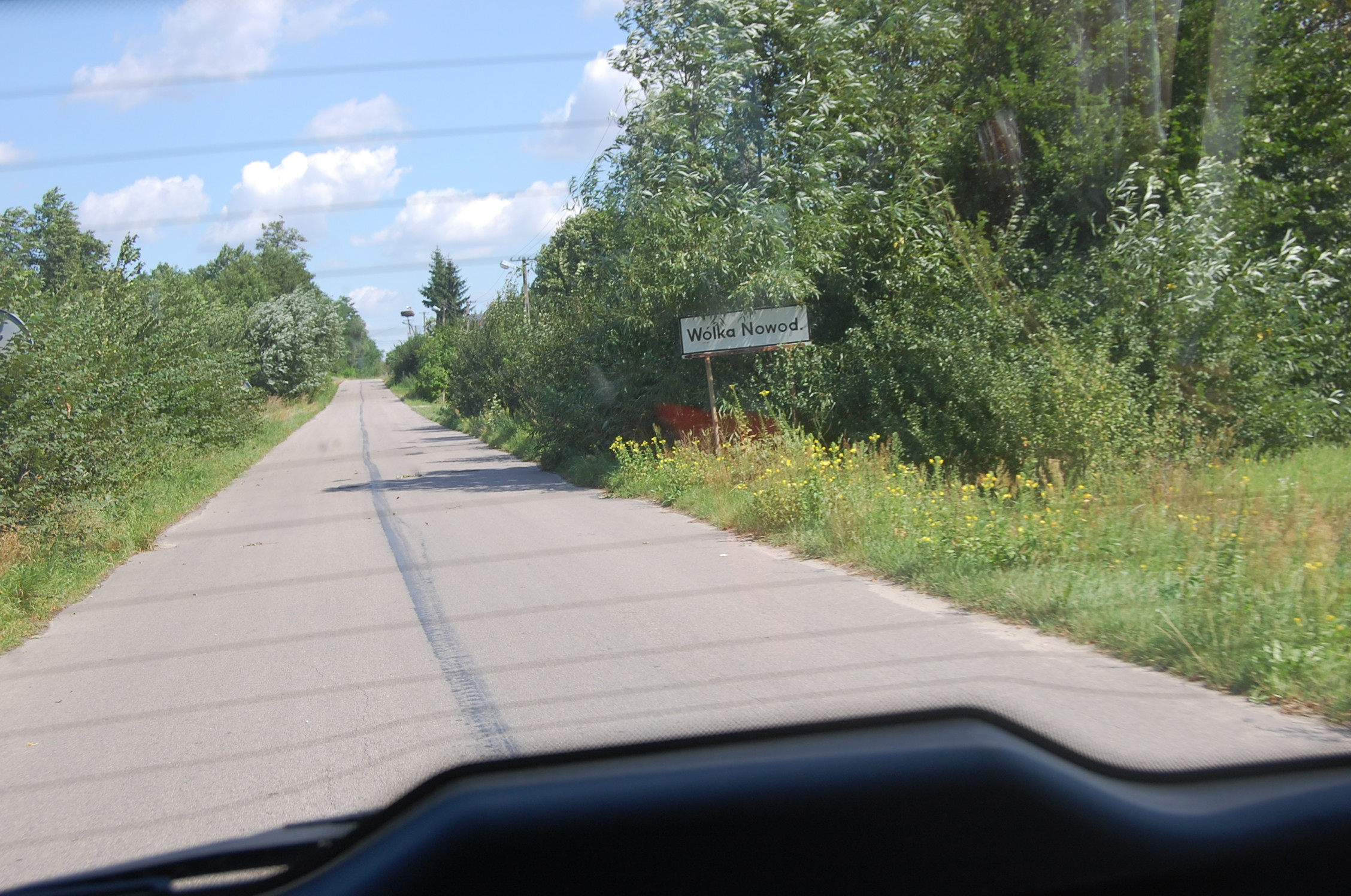

- Location within Poland
- Coordinates: 51°25′06″N 22°10′13″E
- Country: Poland
- Voivodeship: Lublin
- County: Puławy
- Gmina: Kurów

Population
  - Total: 114

Wólka Nowodworska [ˈvulka nɔvɔdˈvɔrska] is a village in the administrative district of Gmina Kurów, within Puławy County, Lublin Voivodeship, in eastern Poland.
