= Łąkoć, Lublin Voivodeship =

Łąkoć
- Village
- Location within Poland
- Coordinates: 51°26′02″N 22°13′37″E
- Country: Poland
- Voivodeship: Lublin
- County: Puławy
- Gmina: Kurów

Population
  - Total: 231
- Time zone: UTC+1 (CET)
  - Summer (DST): UTC+2 (CEST)

Łąkoć [ˈwɔnkɔt͡ɕ] is a village in the administrative district of Gmina Kurów, within Puławy County, Lublin Voivodeship, in eastern Poland.

== History ==
14 Polish citizens were murdered by Nazi Germany in the village during World War II.
