= Podbórz, Lublin Voivodeship =

Podbórz
- Village
- Location within Poland
- Coordinates: 51°24′23″N 22°11′16″E
- Country: Poland
- Voivodeship: Lublin
- County: Puławy
- Gmina: Kurów

Podbórz [ˈpɔdbuʂ] is a village in the administrative district of Gmina Kurów, in Puławy County, Lublin Voivodeship, in eastern Poland.
