= Gmina Nałęczów =

Gmina Nałęczów Nałęczów Commune
- Gmina
- Coat of arms
- Interactive map of Gmina Nałęczów
- Coordinates (Nałęczów): 51°17′N 22°13′E
- Country: Poland
- Voivodeship: Lublin
- County: Puławy
- Seat: Nałęczów

Area
  - Total: 62.86 km^{2} (24.27 sq mi)

Population (2006)
  - Total: 9,502
  - Density: 151.2/km^{2} (391.5/sq mi)
  - Urban: 4,243
  - Rural: 5,259
- Website: http://www.naleczow.pl/

Gmina Nałęczów is an urban-rural gmina (administrative district) in Puławy County, Lublin Voivodeship, in eastern Poland. Its seat is the town of Nałęczów, which lies approximately 23 kilometres (14 mi) south-east of Puławy and 25 km (16 mi) west of the regional capital Lublin.

The gmina covers an area of 62.86 square kilometres (24.3 sq mi), and as of 2006 its total population is 9,502 (out of which the population of Nałęczów amounts to 4,243, and the population of the rural part of the gmina is 5,259).

== Villages ==
Apart from the town of Nałęczów, Gmina Nałęczów contains the villages and settlements of Antopol, Bochotnica-Kolonia, Bronice, Bronice-Kolonia, Chruszczów-Kolonia, Cynków, Czesławice, Drzewce, Drzewce-Kolonia, Ludwinów, Paulinów, Piotrowice, Sadurki and Strzelce.

== Neighbouring gminas ==
Gmina Nałęczów is bordered by the gminas of Garbów, Jastków, Kurów, Markuszów, Wąwolnica and Wojciechów.
