= Gmina Żyrzyn =

Gmina Żyrzyn Żyrzyn Commune
- Gmina
- Flag Coat of arms
- Interactive map of Gmina Żyrzyn
- Coordinates (Żyrzyn): 51°30′N 22°6′E
- Country: Poland
- Voivodeship: Lublin
- County: Puławy
- Seat: Żyrzyn

Area
  - Total: 128.73 km^{2} (49.70 sq mi)

Population (2015)
  - Total: 6,538
  - Density: 50.79/km^{2} (131.5/sq mi)
- Website: http://www.zyrzyn.lubelskie.pl

Gmina Żyrzyn is a rural gmina (administrative district) in Puławy County, Lublin Voivodeship, in eastern Poland. Its seat is the village of Żyrzyn, which lies approximately 14 kilometres (9 mi) north-east of Puławy and 44 km (27 mi) north-west of the regional capital Lublin.

The gmina covers an area of 128.73 square kilometres (49.7 sq mi), and as of 2006 its total population is 6,588 (6,538 in 2015).

== Villages ==
Gmina Żyrzyn contains the villages and settlements of Bałtów, Borysów, Cezaryn, Jaworów, Kośmin, Kotliny, Las-Grzęba, Las-Jawor, Osiny, Parafianka, Sachalin, Skrudki, Strzyżowice, Wilczanka, Wola Osińska, Zagrody, Żerdź and Żyrzyn.

== Neighbouring gminas ==
Gmina Żyrzyn is bordered by the town of Puławy and by the gminas of Abramów, Baranów, Końskowola, Kurów, Puławy, Ryki and Ułęż.
