= Gmina Wąwolnica =

Gmina Wąwolnica Wąwolnica Commune
- Gmina
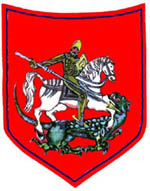
- Coat of arms
- Interactive map of Gmina Wąwolnica
- Coordinates (Wąwolnica): 51°17′35″N 22°8′40″E
- Country: Poland
- Voivodeship: Lublin
- County: Puławy
- Seat: Wąwolnica

Area
  - Total: 62.15 km^{2} (24.00 sq mi)

Population (2015)
  - Total: 4,799
  - Density: 77.22/km^{2} (200.0/sq mi)
- Website: http://www.wawolnica.pl

Gmina Wąwolnica is a rural gmina (administrative district) in Puławy County, Lublin Voivodeship, in eastern Poland. Its seat is the village of Wąwolnica, which lies approximately 19 kilometres (12 mi) south-east of Puławy and 31 km (19 mi) west of the regional capital Lublin.

The gmina covers an area of 62.15 square kilometres (24.0 sq mi), and as of 2006 its total population is 4,936 (4,799 in 2015).

== Villages ==
Gmina Wąwolnica contains the villages and settlements of Bartłomiejowice, Celejów, Grabówki, Huta, Karmanowice, Kębło, Łąki, Łopatki, Łopatki-Kolonia, Mareczki, Rąblów, Rogalów, Stanisławka, Wąwolnica, Zarzeka, Zawada and Zgórzyńskie.

== Neighbouring gminas ==
Gmina Wąwolnica is bordered by the gminas of Karczmiska, Kazimierz Dolny, Końskowola, Kurów, Nałęczów, Poniatowa and Wojciechów.
