= Klin, Lublin Voivodeship =

Klin
- Village
- Location within Poland
- Coordinates: 51°31′27″N 22°10′33″E
- Country: Poland
- Voivodeship: Lublin
- County: Puławy
- Gmina: Baranów

Population
  - Total: 29

Klin [klin] is a village in the administrative district of Gmina Baranów, within Puławy County, Lublin Voivodeship, in eastern Poland.
