= Borysów, Lublin Voivodeship =

Borysów
- Village
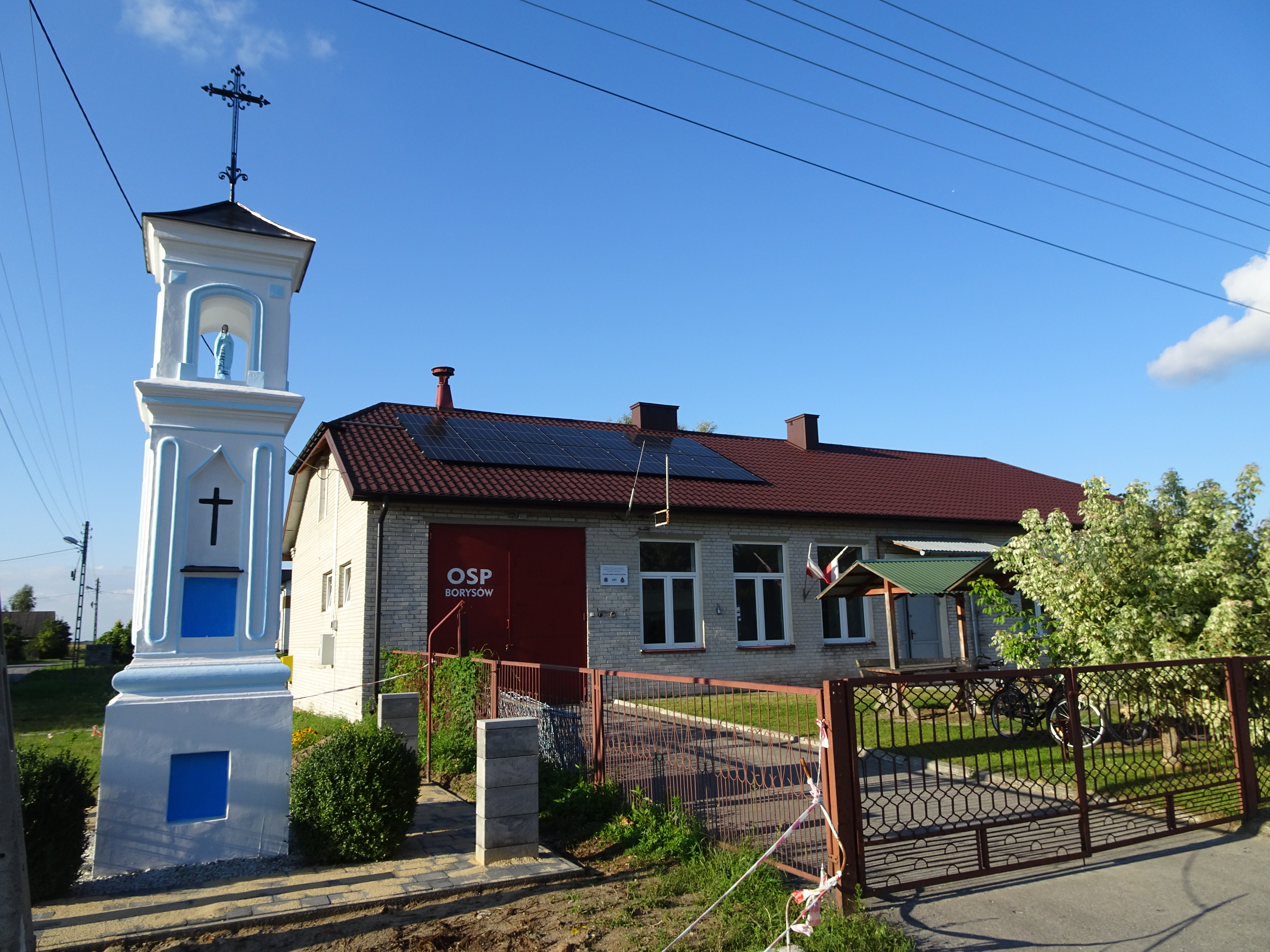
- Volunteer fire department

- Location within Poland
- Coordinates: 51°31′N 22°3′E
- Country: Poland
- Voivodeship: Lublin
- County: Puławy
- Gmina: Żyrzyn
- Time zone: UTC+1 (CET)
  - Summer (DST): UTC+2 (CEST)
- Vehicle registration: LPU
- Website: http://www.borysow.cba.pl

Borysów [bɔˈrɨsuf] is a village in the administrative district of Gmina Żyrzyn, within Puławy County, Lublin Voivodeship, in eastern Poland.
