= Olesin, Puławy County =

Olesin
- Village
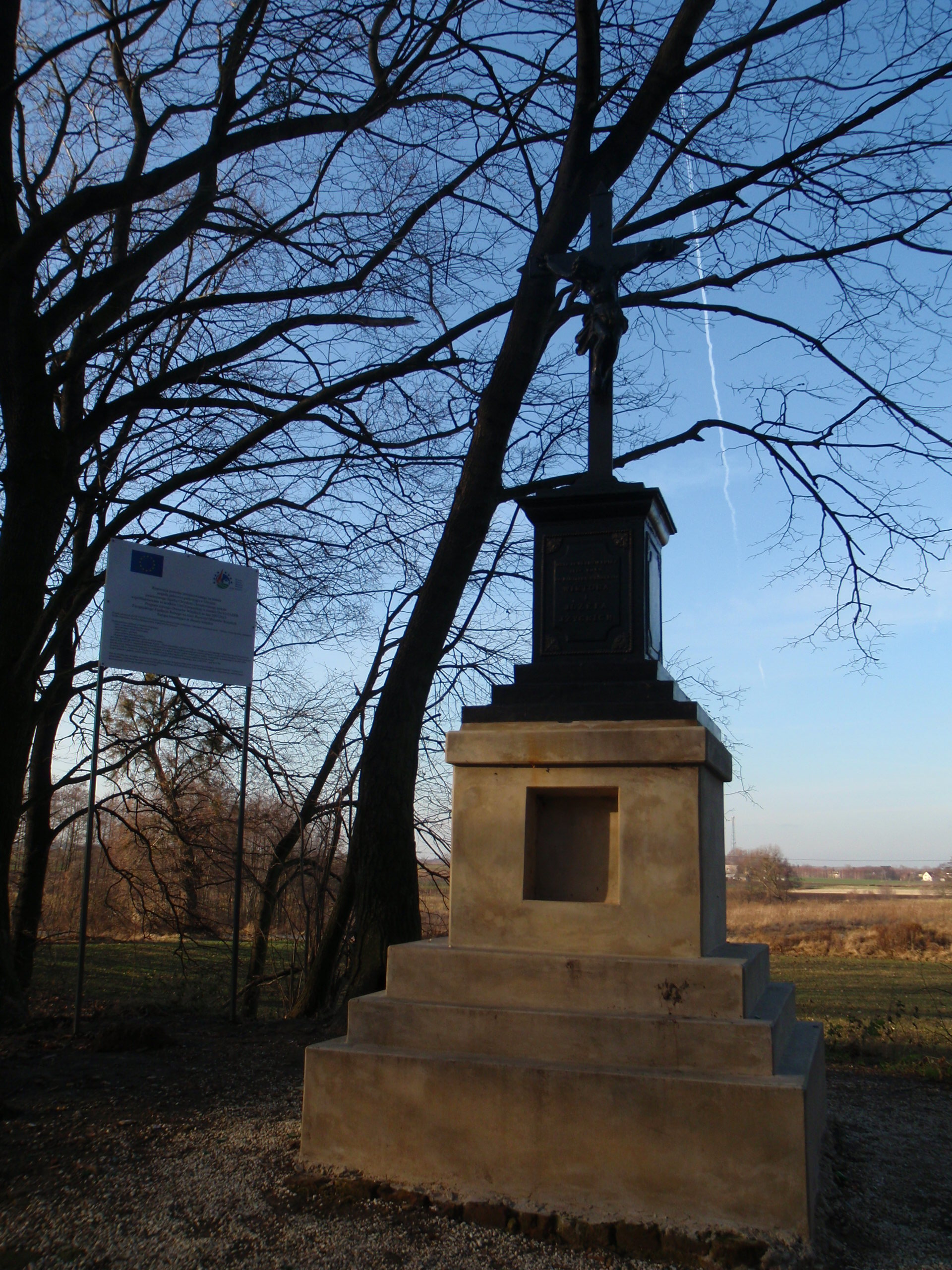
- Monument in Olesin

- Location within Poland
- Coordinates: 51°22′50″N 22°11′48″E
- Country: Poland
- Voivodeship: Lublin
- County: Puławy
- Gmina: Kurów
- Population: 343

Olesin [ɔˈlɛɕin] is a village in the administrative district of Gmina Kurów, within Puławy County, Lublin Voivodeship, in eastern Poland.
