= Gmina Baranów, Lublin Voivodeship =

Gmina Baranów Baranów Commune
- Gmina
- Flag Coat of arms
- Interactive map of Gmina Baranów
- Coordinates (Baranów): 51°33′26″N 22°8′8″E
- Country: Poland
- Voivodeship: Lublin
- County: Puławy
- Seat: Baranów

Area
  - Total: 85.03 km^{2} (32.83 sq mi)

Population (2015)
  - Total: 3,999
  - Density: 47.03/km^{2} (121.8/sq mi)
- Website: http://gminabaranow.pl/

Gmina Baranów is a rural gmina (administrative district) in Puławy County, Lublin Voivodeship, in eastern Poland. Its seat is the village of Baranów, which lies approximately 20 kilometres (12 mi) north-east of Puławy and 46 km (29 mi) north-west of the regional capital Lublin.

The gmina covers an area of 85.03 square kilometres (32.8 sq mi), and as of 2006 its total population is 4,228 (3,999 in 2015).

== Villages ==
Gmina Baranów contains the villages and settlements of Baranów, Czołna, Dębczyna, Gródek, Huta, Karczunek, Klin, Kozioł, Łukawica, Łukawka, Łysa Góra, Motoga, Niwa, Nowomichowska, Pogonów, Składów, Śniadówka, Wola Czołnowska, and Zagóźdź.

== Neighbouring gminas ==
Gmina Baranów is bordered by the gminas of Abramów, Jeziorzany, Michów, Ułęż, and Żyrzyn.
