= Bronice, Lublin Voivodeship =

Village in Poland

Bronice
- Village
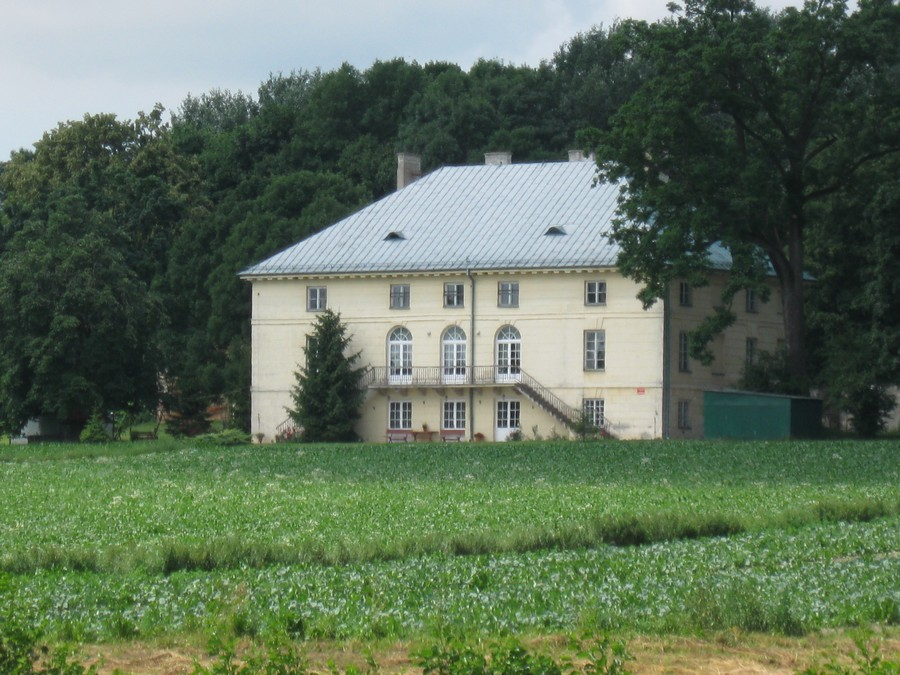
- Manor in Bronice

- Location within Poland
- Coordinates: 51°21′N 22°14′E
- Country: Poland
- Voivodeship: Lublin
- County: Puławy
- Gmina: Nałęczów

Bronice [brɔˈnit͡sɛ] is a village in the administrative district of Gmina Nałęczów, within Puławy County, Lublin Voivodeship, in eastern Poland.
