= Klinsky (rural locality) =

Rural localities in Russia

Klinsky (Russian: Клинский; masculine), Klinskaya (Клинская; feminine), or Klinskoye (Клинское; neuter) is the name of several rural localities in Russia:

- Klinskoye, Brasovsky District, Bryansk Oblast, a selo in Dubrovsky Selsoviet of Brasovsky District of Bryansk Oblast
- Klinskoye, Navlinsky District, Bryansk Oblast, a selo in Sokolovsky Selsoviet of Navlinsky District of Bryansk Oblast
- Klinskoye, Ozyorsky District, Moscow Oblast, a village in Klishinskoye Rural Settlement of Ozyorsky District of Moscow Oblast
- Klinskoye, Serebryano-Prudsky District, Moscow Oblast, a selo in Mochilskoye Rural Settlement of Serebryano-Prudsky District of Moscow Oblast
