= Żyrzyn =

- Village
- Church of Saints Peter and Paul

- Location within Poland
- Coordinates: 51°30′N 22°6′E
- Country: Poland
- Voivodeship: Lublin
- County: Puławy
- Gmina: Żyrzyn

Population
  - Total: 1,400
- Time zone: UTC+1 (CET)
  - Summer (DST): UTC+2 (CEST)
- Vehicle registration: LPU

Żyrzyn [ˈʐɨʐɨn] is a village in Puławy County, Lublin Voivodeship, in eastern Poland. It is the seat of the gmina (administrative district) called Gmina Żyrzyn.

On 8 August 1863, it was the site of the Battle of Żyrzyn between Polish partisans and Russian troops, won by the Poles.
