= Kurów =

- Town
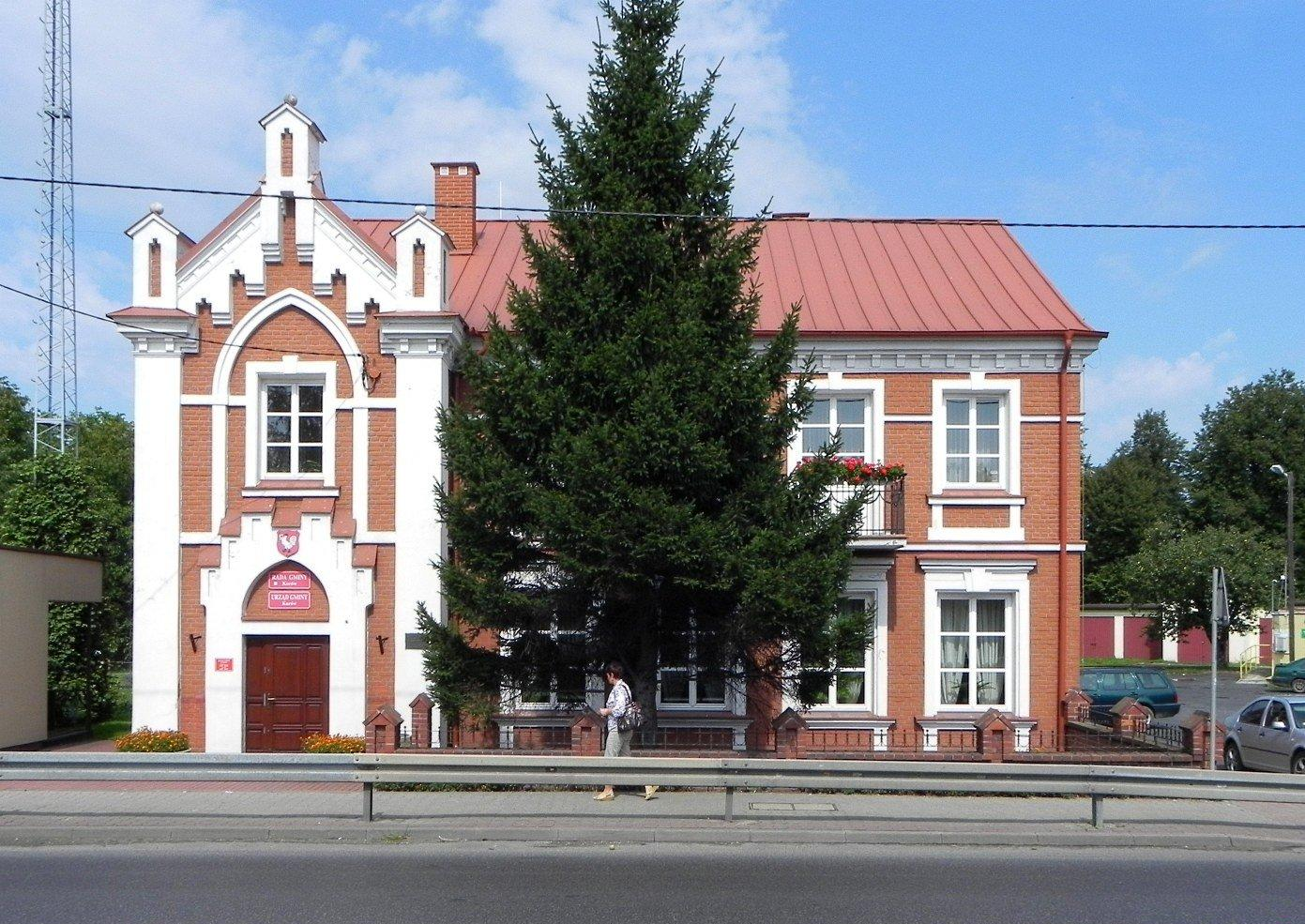
- Town Hall

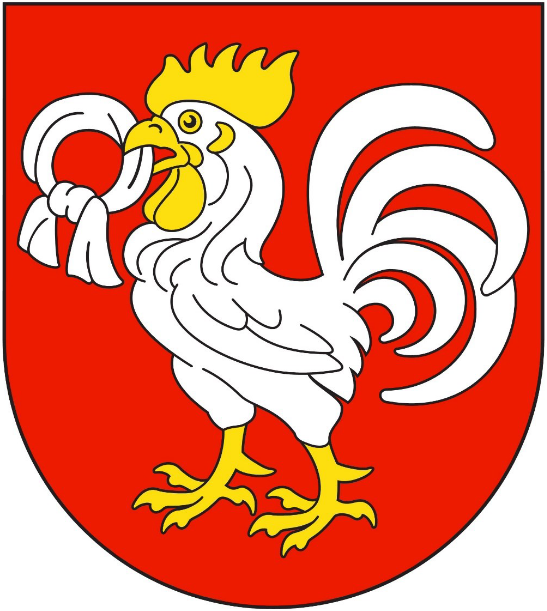
- Coat of arms

- Location within Poland
- Coordinates: 51°23′23″N 22°11′10″E
- Country: Poland
- Voivodeship: Lublin Voivodeship
- County: Puławy
- Gmina: Kurów
- Established: probably 12th century
- Town rights: 1442–1870, since 2025

Government
  - Mayor: Maria Wiejak

Area
  - Total: 11.33 km^{2} (4.37 sq mi)
- Elevation: 157 m (515 ft)

Population (31.12.2018)
  - Total: 2,725
  - Density: 241/km^{2} (620/sq mi)
- Time zone: UTC+1 (CET)
  - Summer (DST): UTC+2 (CEST)
- Postal code: 24-170
- Area code: +48 81
- Car plates: LPU

Kurów [ˈkuruf] is a town in eastern Poland, located in the historic province of Lesser Poland, between Puławy and Lublin, on the Kurówka River. It is the capital of a separate gmina (municipality) called Gmina Kurów, within Lublin Voivodeship. The town has 2,725 inhabitants (as of 2018).

== History ==
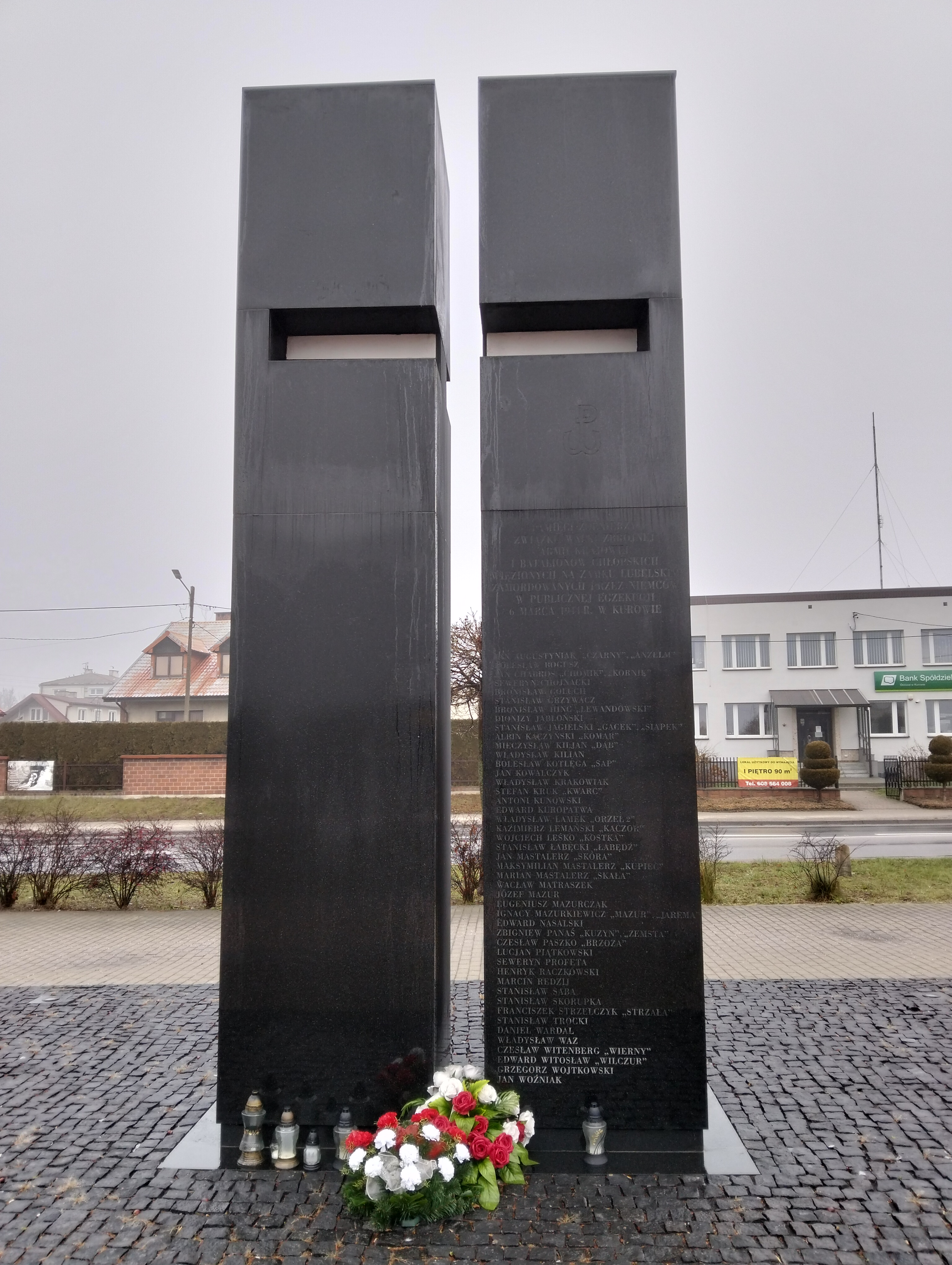
Memorial to Poles massacred by the German occupiers in 1944

Kurów was likely first mentioned in the Gesta principum Polonorum of Gall Anonim as castrum Galli, what is interpreted as the Castle of the Kurowie. The earliest historical mention of Kurów comes from a document issued in 1185, which mentions a church dedicated to Saint Giles already existing in the place. Sometime between 1431 and 1442 the village was granted city rights based on the Magdeburg Law. As a private town, As a private town, it became the market centre for the surrounding area. Several fur and leather factories were also located here. In the 16th century, Kurów became one of the centres of Calvinism, since many of the Polish Brethren settled there. By 1660, most of the inhabitants had converted to Arianism. At that time, Kurów was one of the most important urban centers of the Lublin Voivodeship in the Lesser Poland Province of Poland.

After 1660, the town shares its history with the rest of the region. In 1795, after the Third Partition of Poland, Kurów was annexed by Austria. After the Polish victory in the Austro-Polish War of 1809, it became part of the short-lived Duchy of Warsaw. In 1815, Kurów became part of Russian-controlled Congress Poland. During the November Uprising, in February 1831, the minor Battle of Kurów took place, when the Polish forces under general Józef Dwernicki defeated a Russian army. In 1870, a few years after the January Uprising, Kurów lost its town charter. Since 1918, Kurów was once more part of Poland, as the country regained independence after World War I.

On September 9, 1939, during the German invasion of Poland at the start of World War II, the town was heavily bombed by the German Luftwaffe. Among the targets destroyed was a civilian hospital (marked with red crosses), where many victims perished. During World War II, Germany set up two slave labour camps in the town. In 1942, a minor ghetto was established. However, most of the Poles imprisoned in Kurów escaped and joined the Polish Home Army units operating from the nearby forests. The German occupiers committed two massacres in Kurów. On November 13, 1942, the SS murdered 36 Jews, and on March 6, 1944, the Germans executed 45 Poles, members of the Home Army, with 10 being publicly hanged at the Old Market Square and 35 shot at Puławska Street.

== Jews in Kurów ==
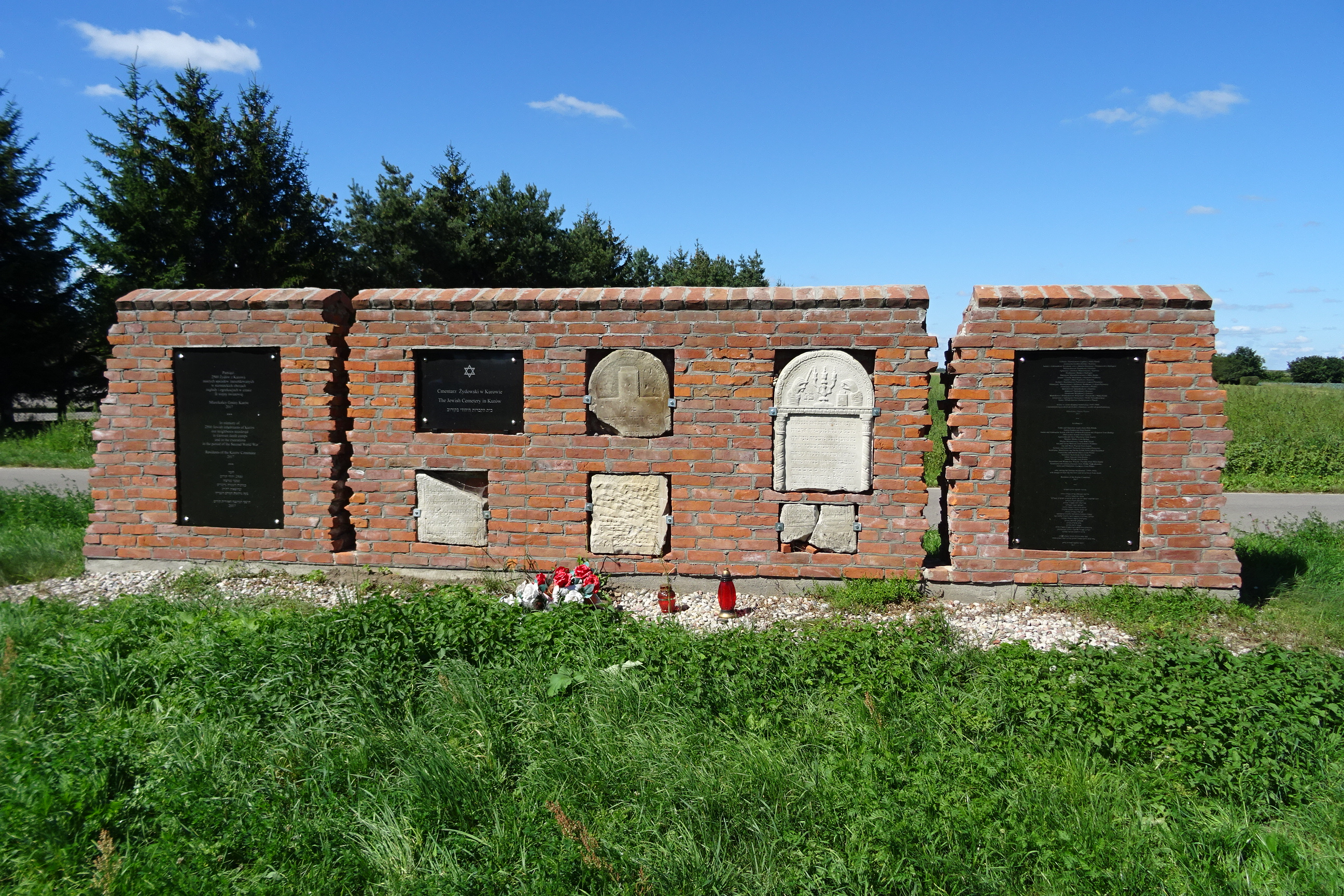
Memorial to Holocaust victims

About 2,600 Jews lived in Kurów when the Second World War began. The Jewish population of Kurów was decimated during the ethnic cleansing following the invasion by the Wehrmacht. The synagogue suffered heavy damages. In June 1941, a ghetto was formed and Jews were forbidden to leave Kurów. In April or May 1942, most of Kurów's Jews were marched by the occupiers to Końskowola, some liquidated along the way, then the next day to the train station near Puławy and forced into trains. They were taken to Sobibor. Several of the Kurów Jews managed to survive the selections of the first day in that camp and those Jews were able to help organize and execute the revolt in Sobibor which resulted in the destruction of the camp by the Germans themselves. Though some Polish Christians denounced Jews to the Germans, others helped shelter and save several of Kurów's Jews: Mieczysław Kutnik, Adam Turczyk, Wacław Mańko, and Andrzej and Katarzyna Zarzycki, the latter whom were recognized as Righteous Among the Nations by Yad Vashem after the war. Additionally, the German Nazi government operated a forced labour camp for Jews from July to November 1942. Several Jews of the pre-war Jewish population of 2,600 survived the war.

Many former Jewish residents of Kurów emigrated to the United States, Israel, Argentina, France before World War II and other points elsewhere, wherever they could find refuge. There was a Kurów burial society in New York.

== Sights ==
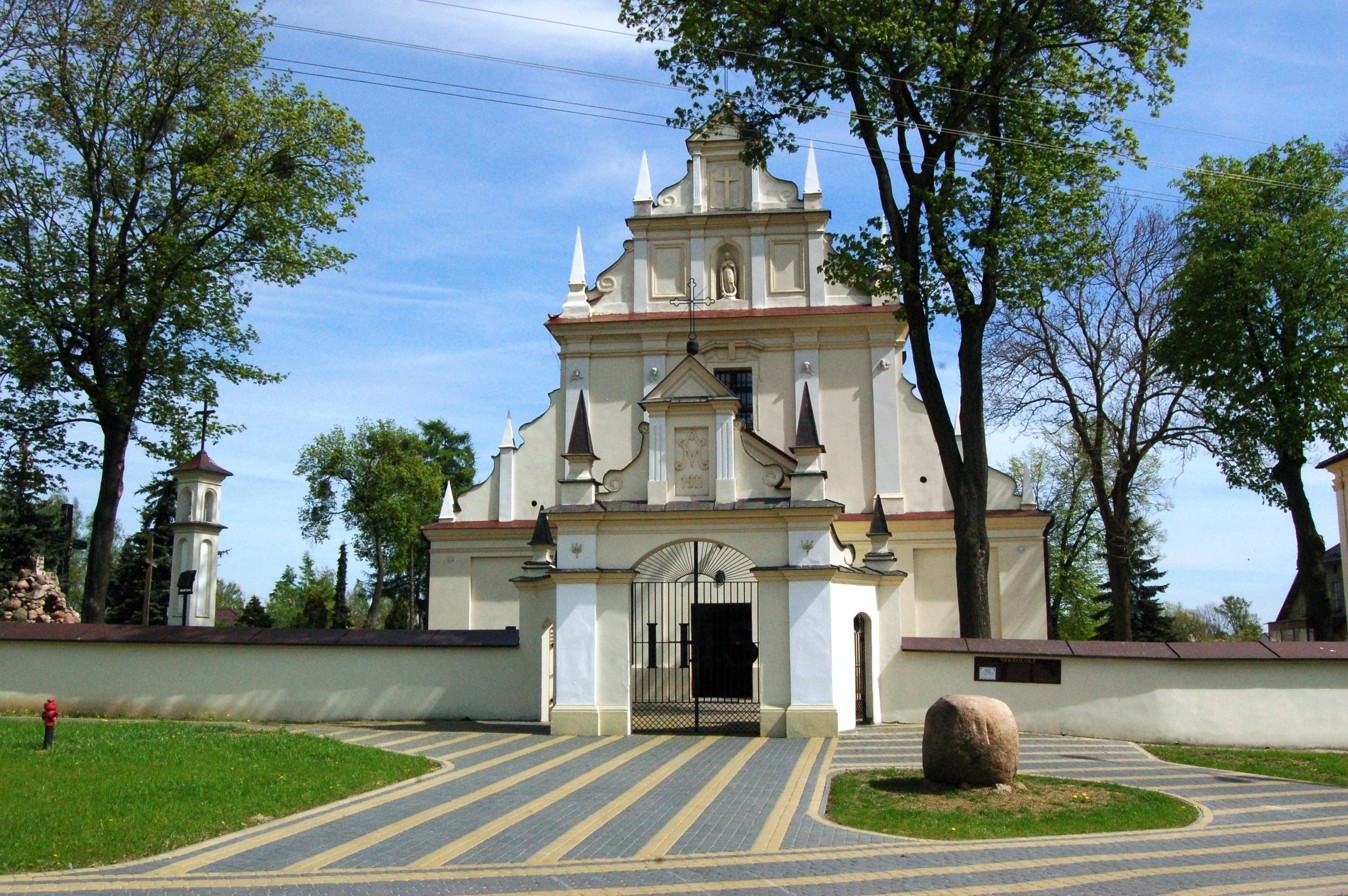
St. Michael's Church

- Lublin Renaissance St. Michael's Church (built in 1452, refurbished in 1692) with the grave of the Zbąski family and sculptures by Santi Gucci (1587)
- Bell tower (built in the 18th century)
- Rectory (built in 1778–1782)
- Gate (built in 1911)
- Vicar's building and parish school
- Commune Hall (built in the 19th century)
- World War I Cemetery
- Post office (built in the 18th century)
- Thermae (built in the 19th century)
- Monuments and memorials, including memorials to victims of German occupation during World War II, a memorial to 18th-century statesman and founder of a local school Ignacy Potocki, and a khachkar to 18th-century educator Grzegorz Piramowicz

== Transport ==
The S12 and S17 expressways run through the north of Kurów since 2013, allowing Lublin–Warsaw traffic to bypass the town.

== Sport clubs ==
- KKS Garbarnia (football, e-sport)
- KTS Topspin (table tennis, ping pong)
- Kur-Team (Nordic walking)
- OSP (fire-fighting sport)

== Notable people ==
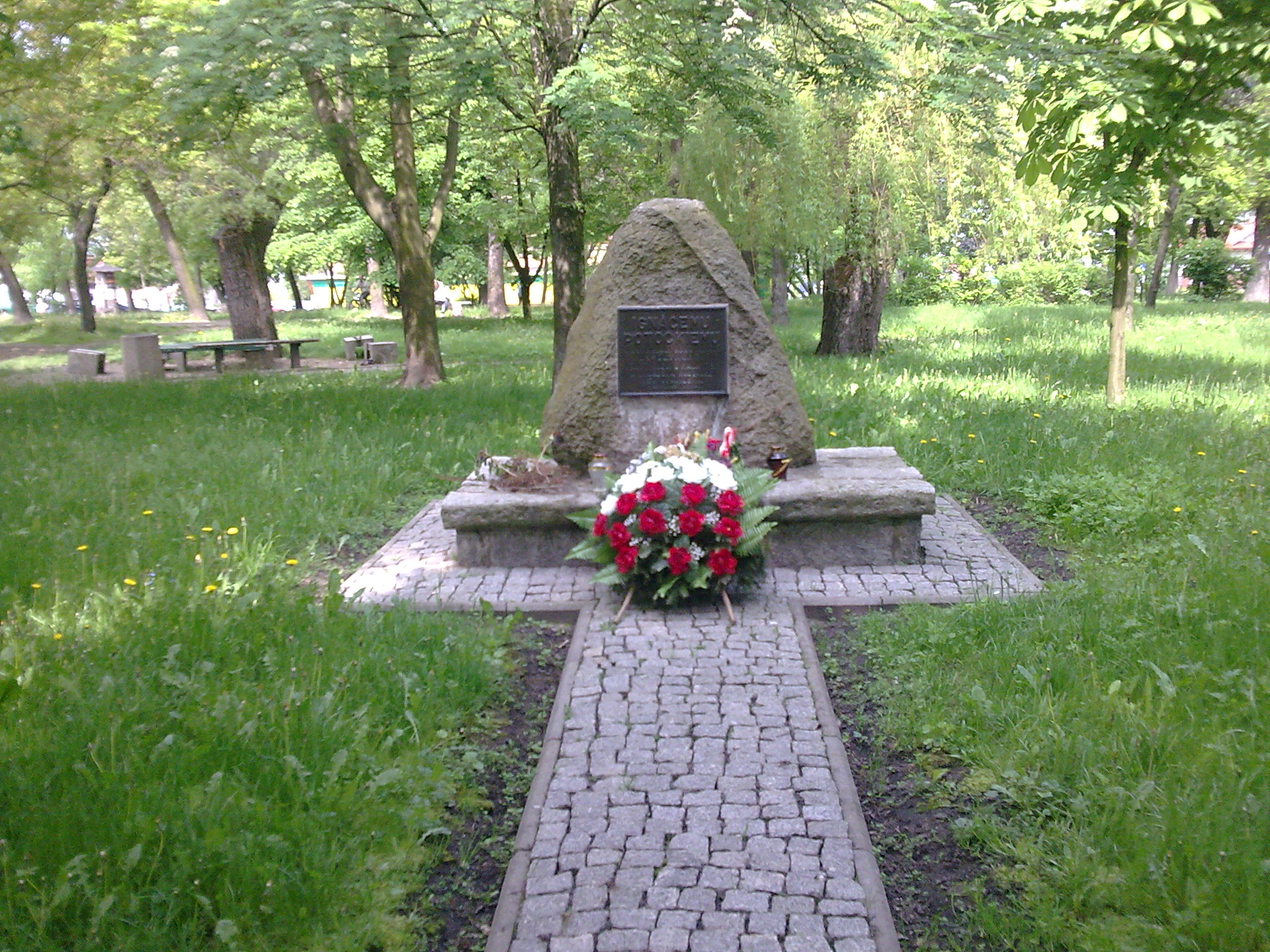
Memorial to Ignacy Potocki

- Wojciech Jaruzelski – general, former Polish president and communist dictator (born 1923 in Kurów, died 2014 in Warsaw)
- Czesław Janczarski – poet, writer of fairy tales for children (born 1911 in Hruszwica, died 1971 in Warsaw)
- Klemens Kurowski – Polish nobleman and senator, owner of Kurów (born around 1340, died before 1405)
- Grzegorz Piramowicz – priest in Kurów, writer, philosopher (born 1735 in Lwów, died 1801 in Międzyrzec Podlaski)
- Ignacy Potocki – nobleman, owner of Kurów (born 1750, died 1809 in Vienna)
