= Klementowice =

- Village
- Location within Poland
- Coordinates: 51°21′N 22°9′E
- Country: Poland
- Voivodeship: Lublin
- County: Puławy
- Gmina: Kurów
- Elevation: 190 m (620 ft)
- Population: 1,391

Klementowice [klɛmɛntɔˈvit͡sɛ] is a village in the administrative district of Gmina Kurów, within Puławy County, Lublin Voivodeship, in eastern Poland.
