= Gmina Kurów =

Gmina Kurów Kurów Commune
- Gmina
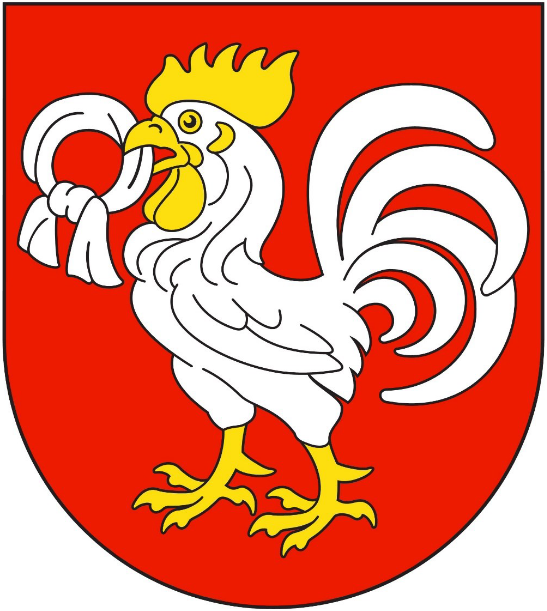
- Coat of arms
- Interactive map of Gmina Kurów
- Coordinates (Kurów): 51°24′N 22°11′E
- Country: Poland
- Voivodeship: Lublin
- County: Puławy
- Seat: Kurów

Area
  - Total: 101.3 km^{2} (39.1 sq mi)

Population (2015)
  - Total: 7,766
  - Density: 76.66/km^{2} (198.6/sq mi)
- TERYT code: 0614062
- Website: https://www.kurow.eu/

Map of gmina

Gmina Kurów is a rural gmina (administrative district) in Puławy County, Lublin Voivodeship, in eastern Poland. Its seat is the village of Kurów, which lies approximately 16 kilometres (10 mi) east of Puławy and 32 km (20 mi) north-west of the regional capital Lublin.

The gmina covers an area of 101.3 square kilometres (39.1 sq mi), and as of 2006 its total population is 7,892 (7,766 in 2015).

== Neighbouring gminas ==
Gmina Kurów is bordered by the gminas of Abramów, Końskowola, Markuszów, Nałęczów, Wąwolnica and Żyrzyn.

== Villages in the gmina ==
- Barlogi
- Bronislawka
- Brzozowa Gac
- Buchalowice
- Choszczów
- Deba
- Góry Olesińskie
- Kalinówka
- Klementowice
- Kloda
- Kolonia Buchalowice
- Kolonia Klementowice
- Kolonia Nowy Dwór
- Kolonia Plonki
- Kurów
- Lakoc
- Mala Deba
- Mala Kloda
- Marianka
- Olesin
- Paluchów
- Plonki
- Podbórz
- Posiolek
- Szumów
- Wegielnica
- Wólka Nowodworska
- Wygoda
- Zastawie

== Rivers ==
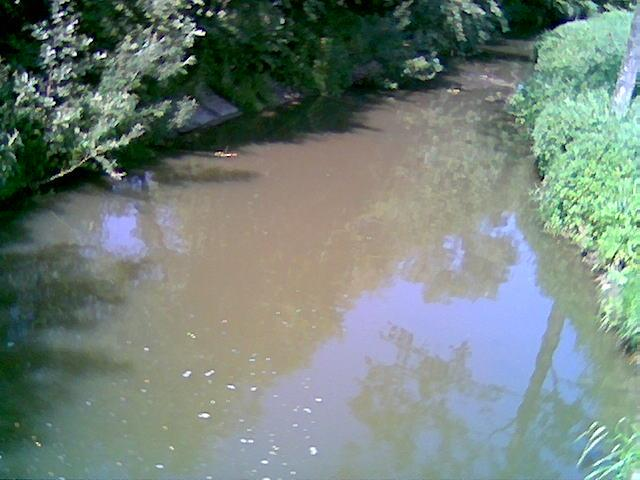
Kurowka River

- Kurówka
- Bielkowa
- Struga Kurów
- Struga Wodna
