= Powiat nowodworski =

Powiat nowodworski may refer to either of two counties (powiats) in Poland:

- Nowy Dwór County, Pomeranian Voivodeship (north Poland)
- Nowy Dwór County, Masovian Voivodeship (east-central Poland)
