= Puławy County =

Puławy County Powiat puławski
- County
- Flag Coat of arms

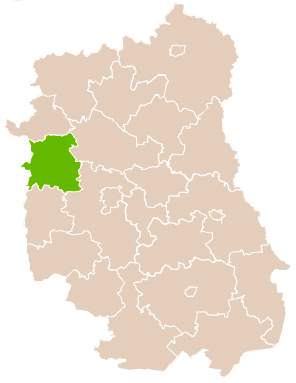
- Location within the voivodeship
- Coordinates (Puławy): 51°25′N 21°58′E
- Country: Poland
- Voivodeship: Lublin
- Seat: Puławy
- Gminas: Total 11 (incl. 1 urban): Puławy; Gmina Baranów; Gmina Janowiec; Gmina Kazimierz Dolny; Gmina Końskowola; Gmina Kurów; Gmina Markuszów; Gmina Nałęczów; Gmina Puławy; Gmina Wąwolnica; Gmina Żyrzyn

Area
  - Total: 933 km^{2} (360 sq mi)

Population (2019)
  - Total: 113,441
  - Density: 122/km^{2} (315/sq mi)
  - Urban: 53,946
  - Rural: 59,495
- Car plates: LPU
- Website: http://www.pulawy.powiat.pl/

Puławy County (Polish: powiat puławski) is a unit of territorial administration and local government (powiat) in Lublin Voivodeship, eastern Poland. It was first established in 1867, but its current borders were established on January 1, 1999, as a result of the Polish local government reforms passed in 1998. Its administrative seat and largest town is Puławy, which lies 46 kilometres (29 mi) north-west of the regional capital Lublin. The county also contains the towns of Nałęczów, lying 23 km (14 mi) south-east of Puławy, and Kazimierz Dolny, 11 km (7 mi) south of Puławy.

The county covers an area of 933 square kilometres (360.2 sq mi). In 2019, its total population was 113,441, including 47,634 in Puławy, 3,749 in Nałęczów, 2,563 in Kazimierz Dolny and a rural population of 59,495.

== Neighbouring counties ==
Puławy County is bordered by Ryki County to the north, Lubartów County and Lublin County to the east, Opole County to the south, Zwoleń County to the west, and Kozienice County to the north-west.

== Administrative divisions ==
The county is subdivided into 11 gminas (one urban, two urban-rural and eight rural). These are listed in the following table, in descending order of population.

Gmina	Type	Area (km^{2})	Population (2006)	Population (2011)	Population (2019)	Seat
Puławy	urban	50.5	49,839	49,793	47,634	
Gmina Puławy	rural	160.8	11,172	11,703	12,081	Puławy (Note: seat not part of the gmina)
Gmina Nałęczów	urban-rural	62.9	9,502	9,328	8,959	Nałęczów
Gmina Końskowola	rural	89.6	9,050	9,048	8,832	Końskowola
Gmina Kurów	rural	101.3	7,892	7,827	7,656	Kurów
Gmina Kazimierz Dolny	urban-rural	72.5	7,018	6,977	6,673	Kazimierz Dolny
Gmina Żyrzyn	rural	128.7	6,588	6,584	6,428	Żyrzyn
Gmina Wąwolnica	rural	62.2	4,936	4,863	4,669	Wąwolnica
Gmina Baranów	rural	85.0	4,228	4,118	3,896	Baranów
Gmina Janowiec	rural	79.0	3,594	3,673	3,663	Janowiec
Gmina Markuszów	rural	40.4	3,010	3,070	2,950	Markuszów
TOTAL		932.9	116,829	116,984	113,441	
