= Janowiec Castle =

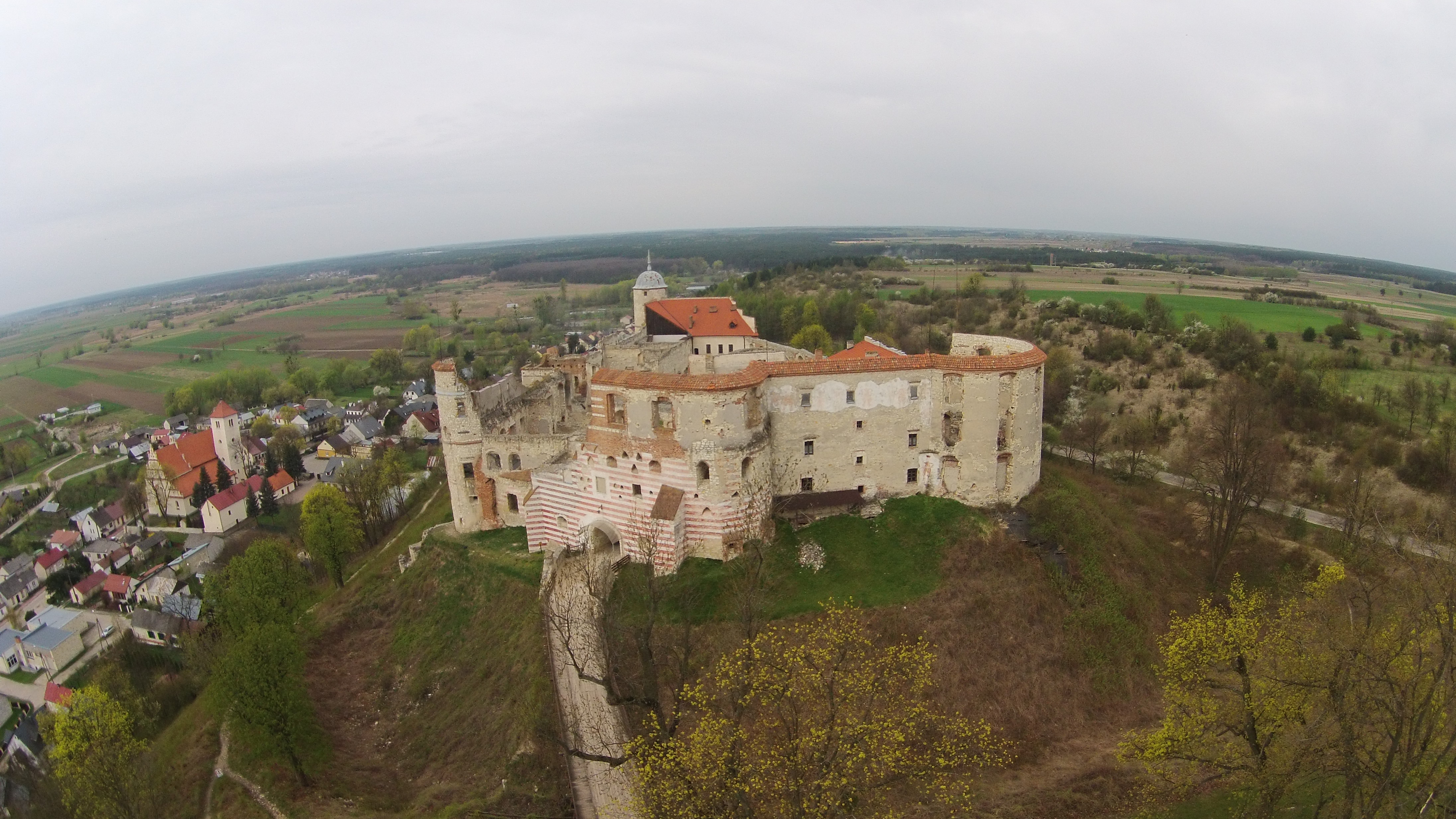
- Janowiec Castle

- Location of Janowiec Castle in Poland
- 51°19′28″N 21°53′32″E
- Location: Janowiec, Lublin Voivodeship; in Poland

History
- Built: 1508-1526
- Rebuilt: 1565-1585

Site notes
- Architectural style: Renaissance

Janowiec Castle - a Renaissance castle built in between 1508 and 1526, on a steep Vistulan hillside in Janowiec (14,5 km south of Puławy), Lublin Voivodeship, in Poland.

== History ==
The castle was most likely built by Mikołaj Firlej at the beginning of the sixteenth century and expanded by his son, Piotr, the Voivode of the Ruthenian Voivodeship. The bastion, used as a residence, was destroyed by the Swedish army in 1655 during The Deluge. Although the following owners of the castle did their very best to rebuild the castle, the castle never managed to regain its former glory. In 1928, an archaeologist, Leon Kozłowski had taken over the castle, but his plans to reconstruct the castle were stopped by the Second World War. After the Second World War, the castle was left in its former state, being one of many private castles. In 1975, the castle was bought by the Nadwiślańskie Museum in Kazimierz Dolny in Poland.

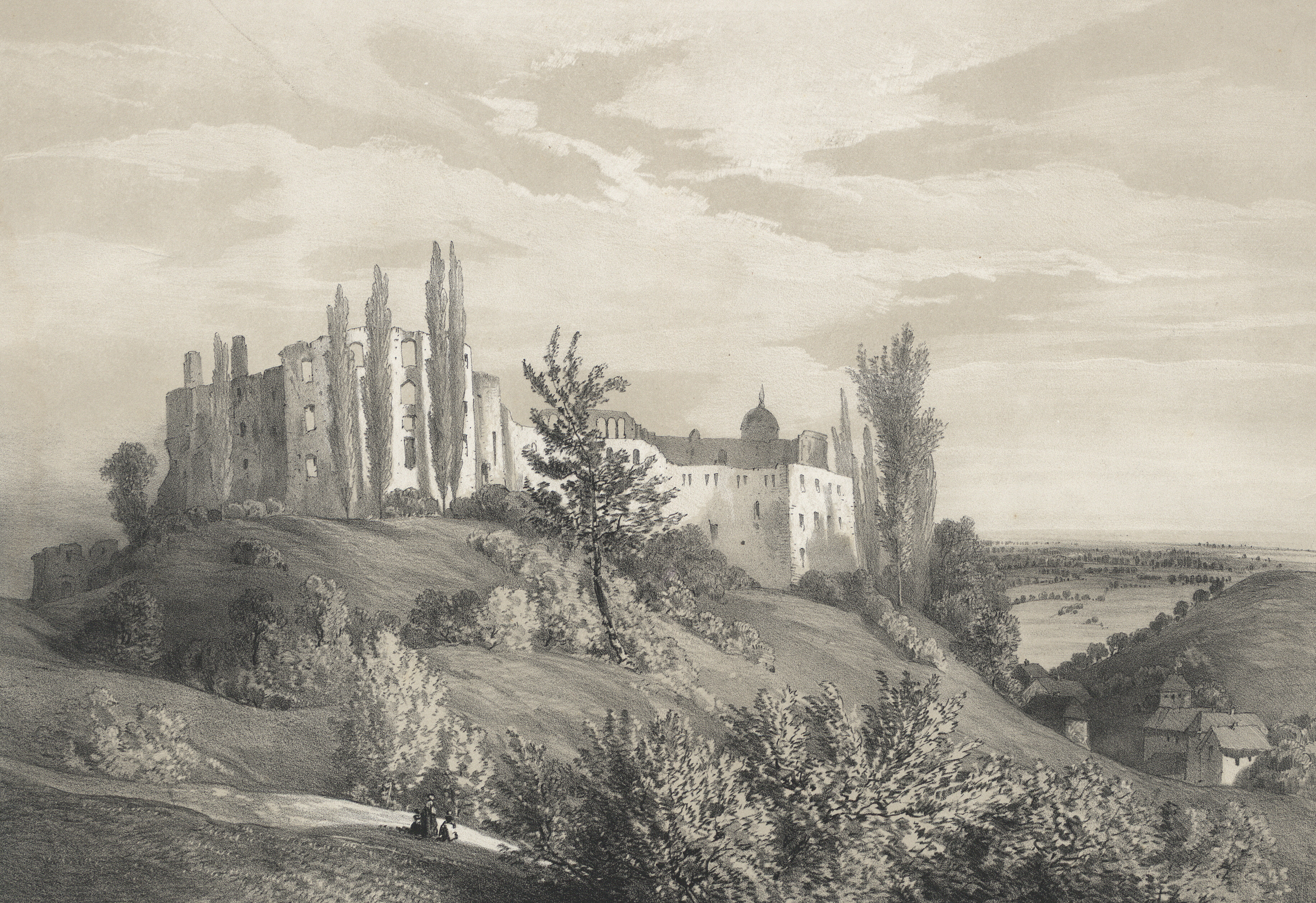
Castle, after 1857

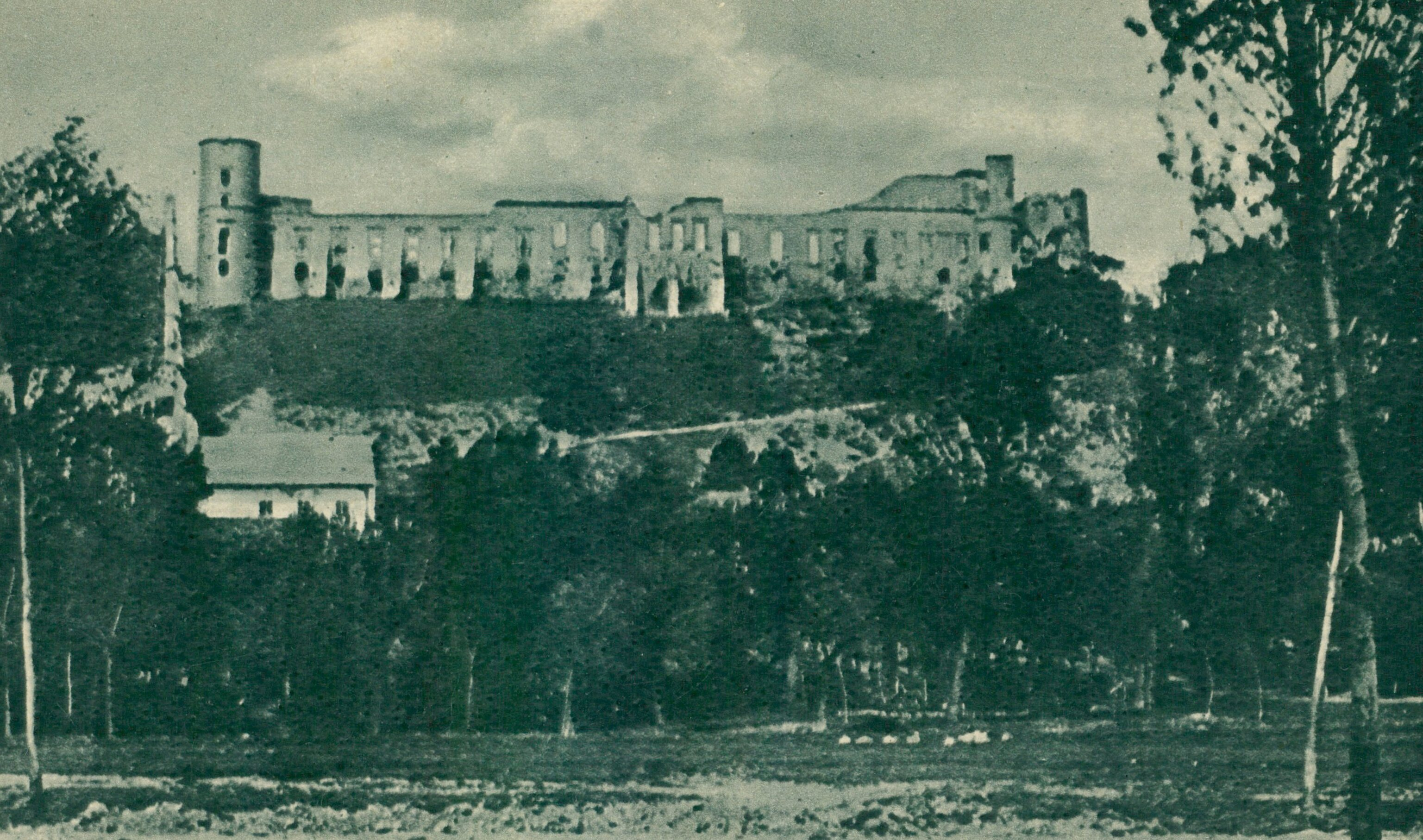
Castle, after 1906

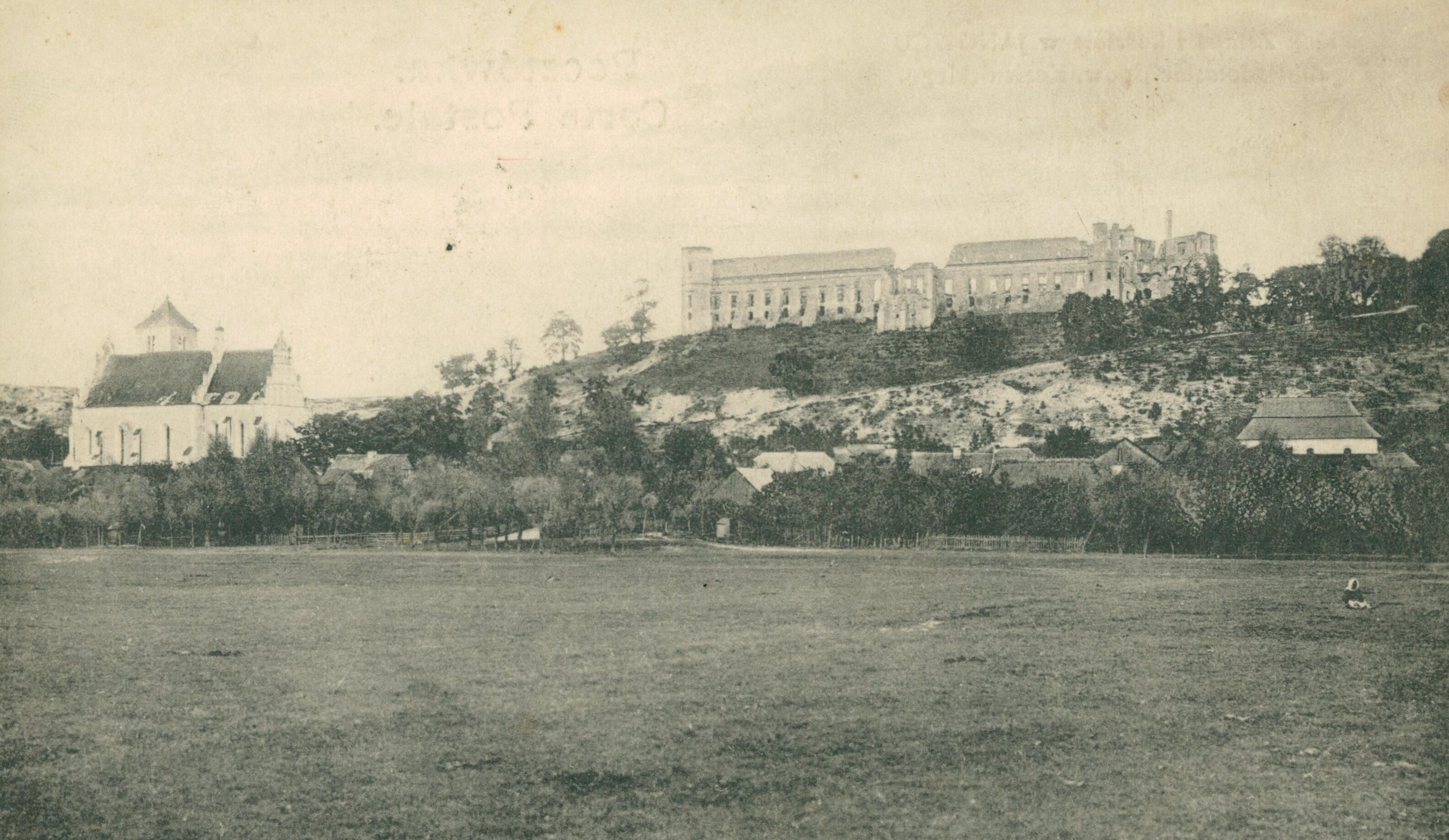
Janowiec, 1914

== See also ==
- Castles in Poland
