= Kazimierz Dolny Castle =

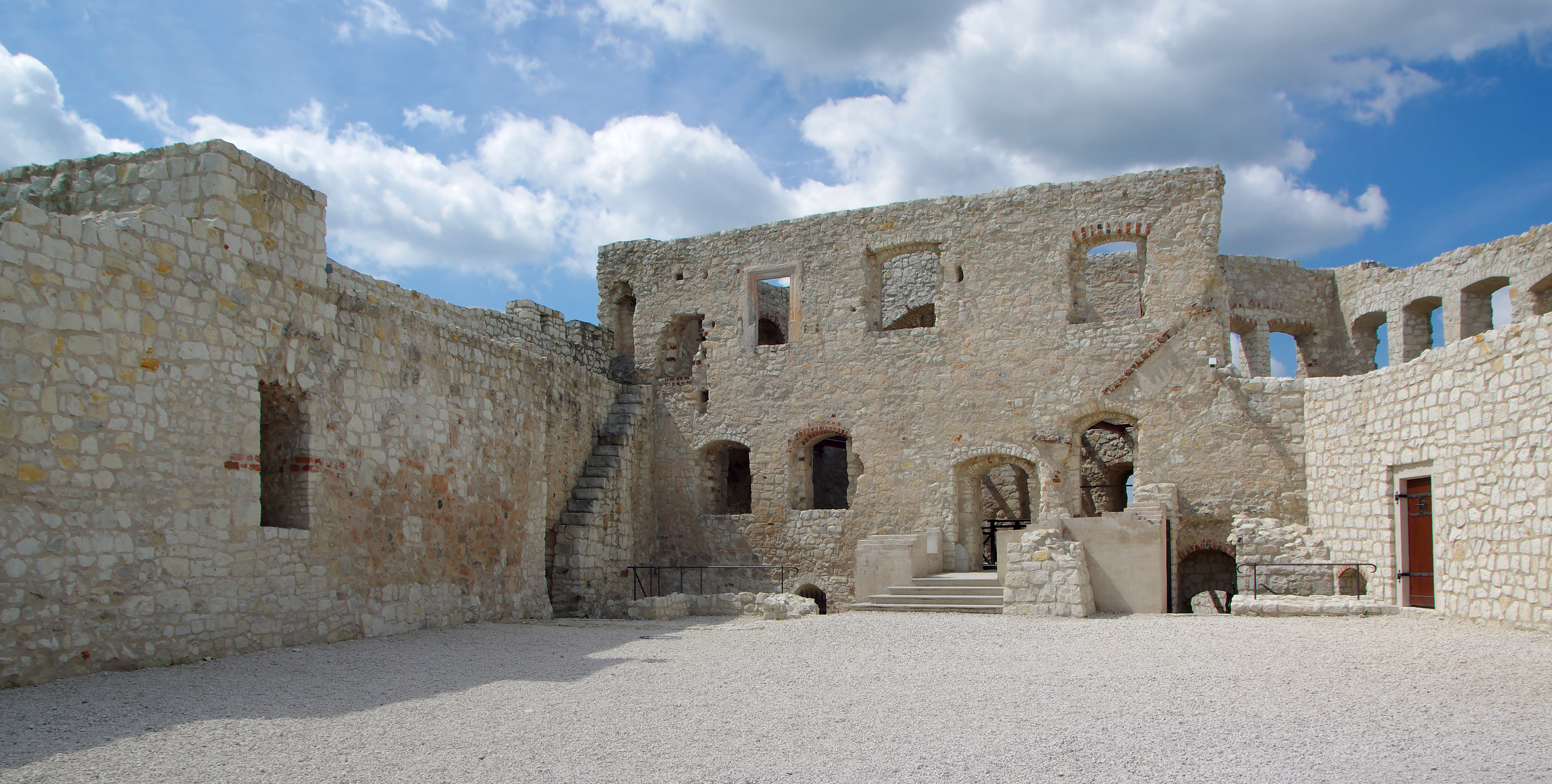
- Kazimierz Dolny Castle

- Location of the Kazimierz Dolny Castle in Poland Kazimierz Dolny Castle (Lublin Voivodeship)
- 51°19′25″N 21°56′56″E
- Location: Kazimierz Dolny, Lublin Voivodeship, in Poland

History
- Built: 13-14th century

Site notes
- Architectural style: Romanesque

Kazimierz Dolny Castle, originating from the thirteenth and fourteenth-century, is a Romanesque castle ruins located in Kazimierz Dolny, Lublin Voivodeship in Poland.

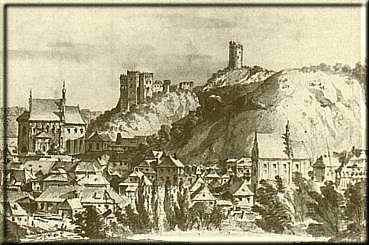
An 1811 watercolour painting of the town and castle by Jan Feliks Piwarski

== See also ==
- Castles in Poland
