= Janowiec, Lublin Voivodeship =

Janowiec
- Village
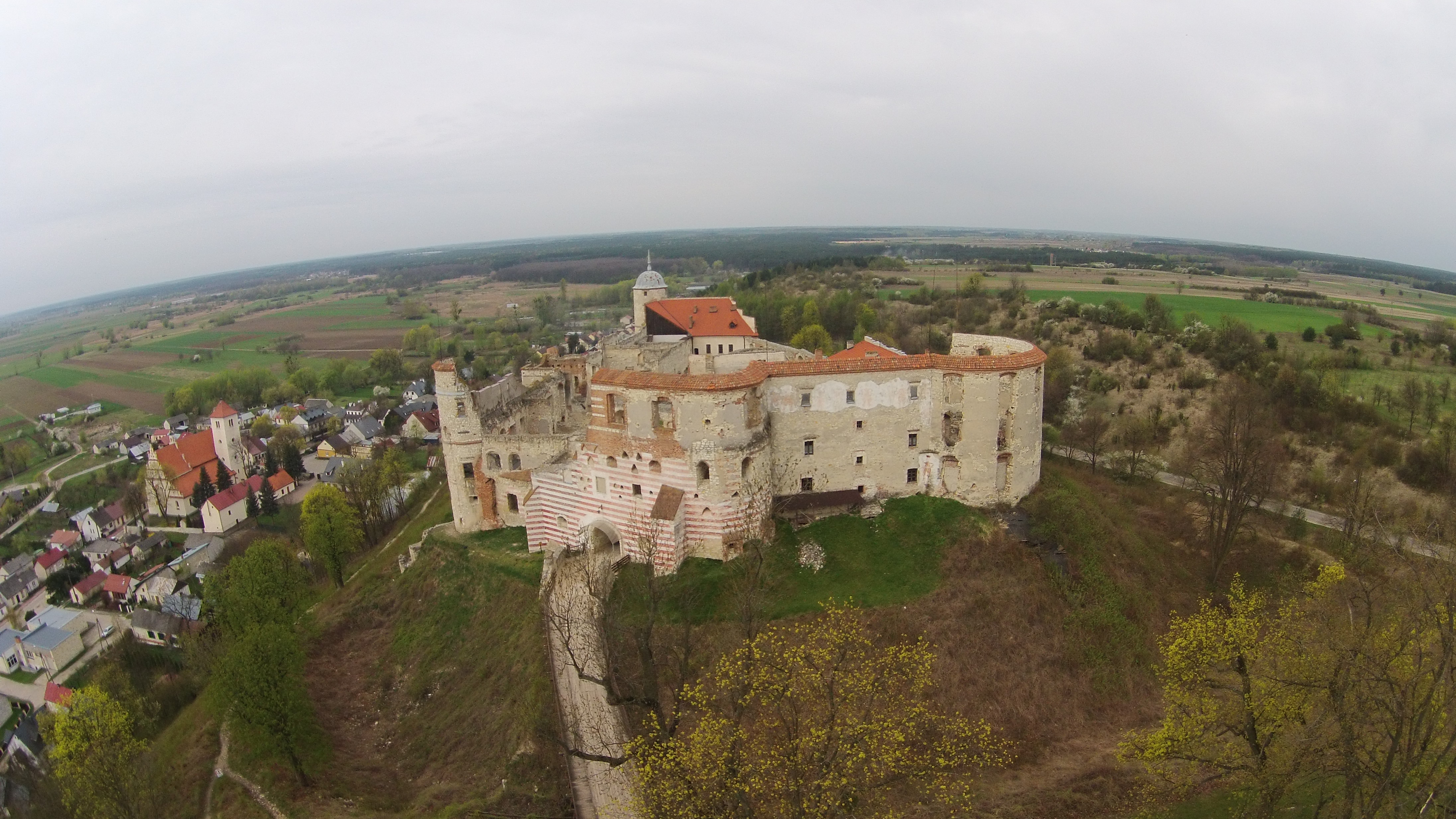
- Janowiec Castle

- Coat of arms

- Location within Poland
- Coordinates: 51°19′29″N 21°52′59″E
- Country: Poland
- Voivodeship: Lublin
- County: Puławy
- Gmina: Janowiec

Population
  - Total: 1,000
- Vehicle registration: LPU

Janowiec [jaˈnɔvjɛt͡s] is a village in Puławy County, Lublin Voivodeship, in eastern Poland. It is the seat of the gmina (administrative district) called Gmina Janowiec.

== History ==
It received its town charter in 1537, but lost it in 1870. The ruins of a large castle are nearby. The 6th Polish National Cavalry Brigade was stationed in Janowiec in 1792.

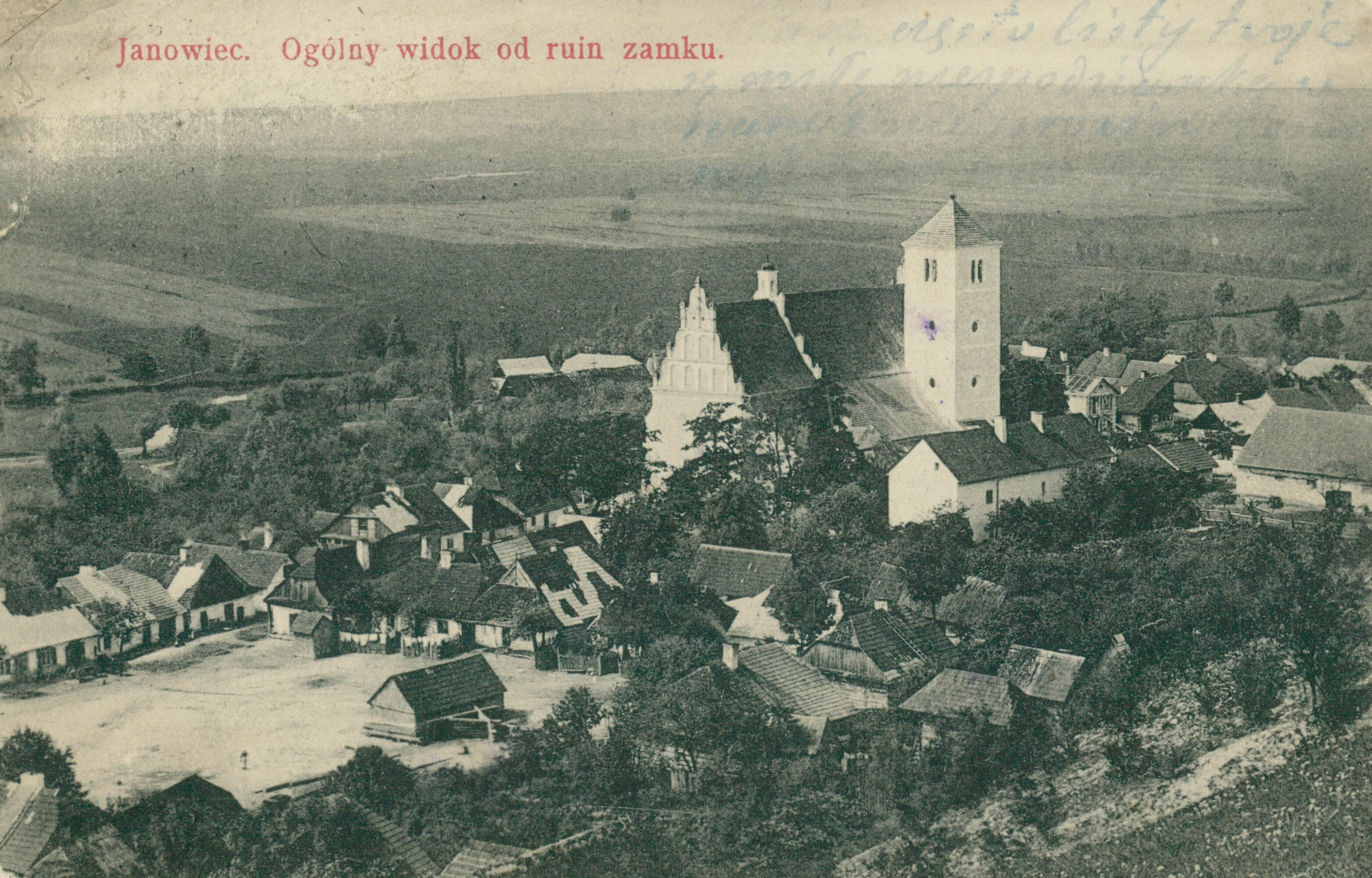
Janowiec, 1914-1918

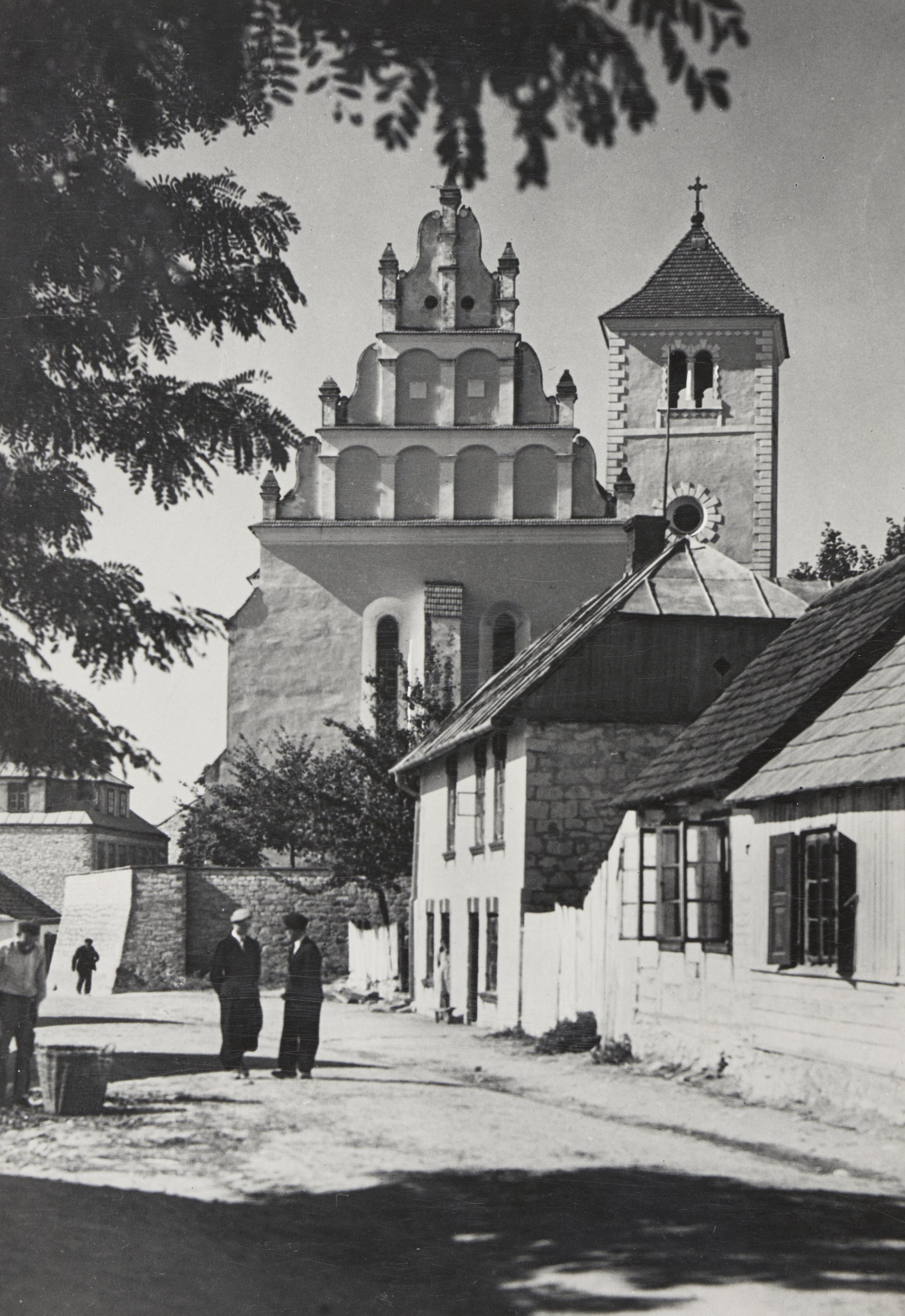
Church, 1939

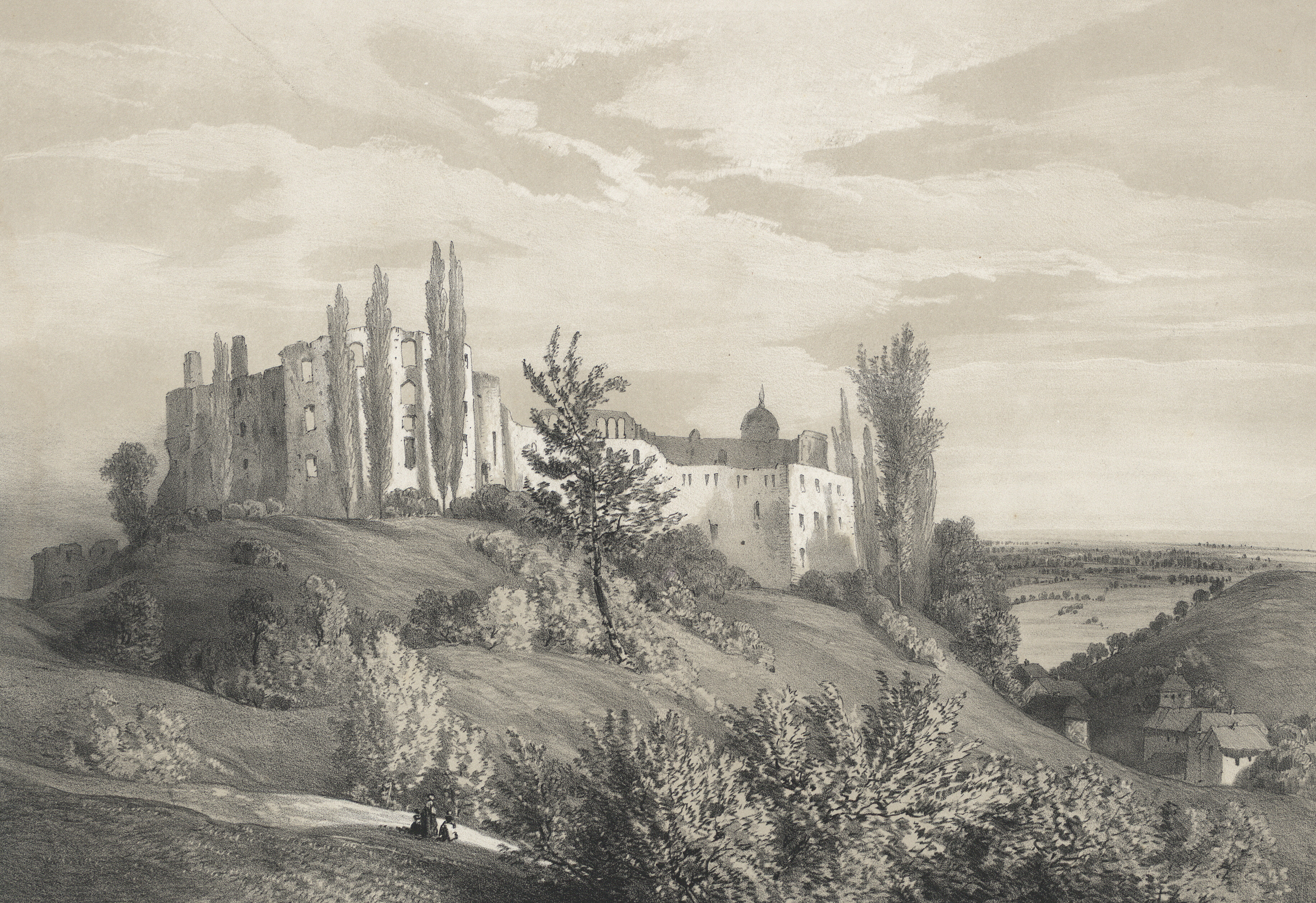
Castle, after 1857

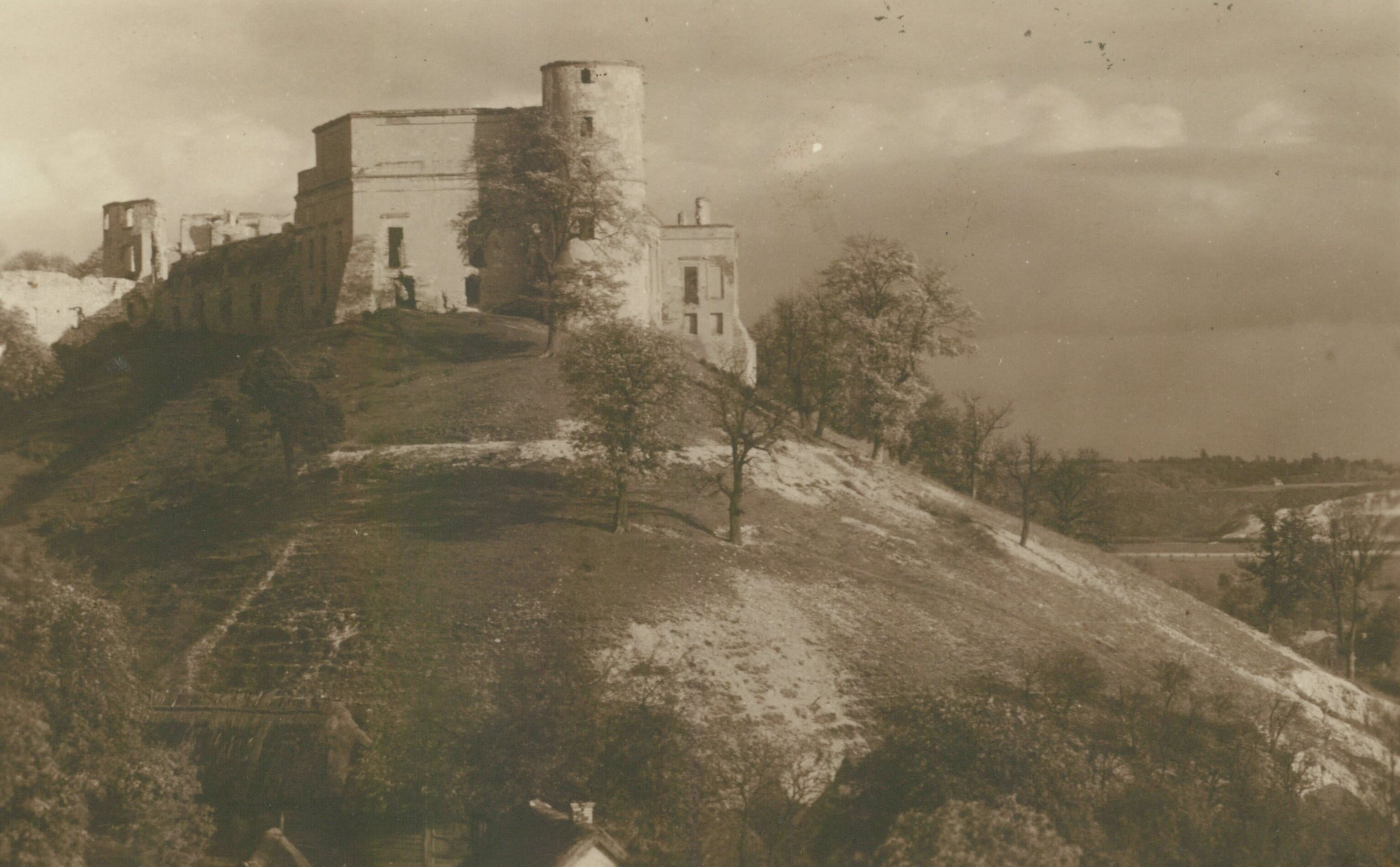
Castle, after 1906
