= Kazimierz Dolny =

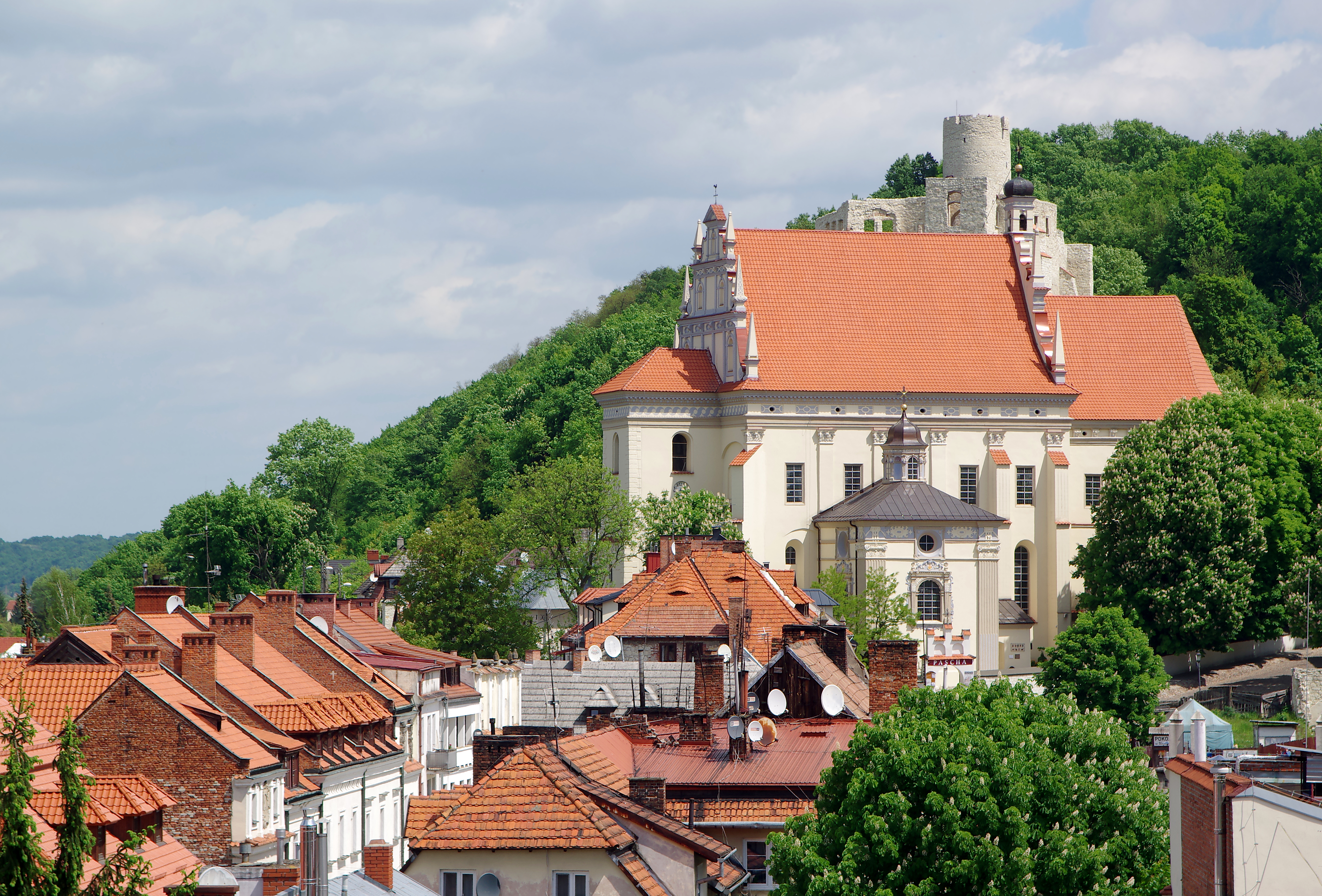
- Kazimierz Dolny - View of the town

- Flag Coat of arms

- Location within Poland
- Coordinates: 51°19′20″N 21°56′51″E
- Country: Poland
- Voivodeship: Lublin
- County: Puławy
- Gmina: Kazimierz Dolny

Government
  - Mayor: Artur Pomianowski (Ind.)

Area
  - Total: 30.44 km^{2} (11.75 sq mi)

Population (2019)
  - Total: 2,530
  - Density: 83.1/km^{2} (215/sq mi)
- Time zone: UTC+1 (CET)
  - Summer (DST): UTC+2 (CEST)
- Postal code: 24-120
- Car plates: LPU
- Website: kazimierzdolny.pl

Historic Monument of Poland
- Designated: 1994-09-08
- Reference no.: M.P. z 1994 r. Nr 50, poz. 417

Kazimierz Dolny (Polish pronunciation: [kaˈʑimjɛʐ ˈdɔlnɨ]) is a small historic town in eastern Poland, on the right (eastern) bank of the Vistula river, 50 km (31 mi) from Lublin, in Puławy County, Lublin Voivodeship. Historically it belongs to Lesser Poland, and in the past it was one of the most important cities of the province.

Now a tourist destination, the town enjoyed its greatest prosperity in the 16th and the first half of the 17th century, due to the trade in grain conducted along the Vistula. It became an economic backwater after that trade declined, and this freeze in economic development enabled the town to preserve its Renaissance urban plan and appearance. Since the 19th century it has become a holiday destination, attracting artists and summer residents.

Kazimierz Dolny is an art center in Poland. Many painters retreat to this small town to paint and sell their work. Galleries can be found in almost every street, offering for sale sculptures, stained-glass, folk art, and fine art.

The town is one of Poland's official national Historic Monuments (Pomnik historii), as designated September 16, 1994 and tracked by the National Heritage Board of Poland.

== Location ==
Kazimierz Dolny is located on the eastern bank of the Vistula (Wisła), at the edge of historical Lublin Upland extending further east from Małopolska Upland to the west. It owes its picturesque location to the Lesser Polish Gorge of the Vistula. The town is part of the so-called "tourist triangle": Puławy – Kazimierz Dolny – Nałęczów. It does not have a rail connection, the nearest station is located in Puławy (Puławy - Miasto).

== History ==
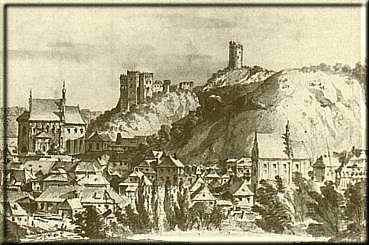
View of Kazimierz Dolny in 1811, watercolour painting by Jan Feliks Piwarski

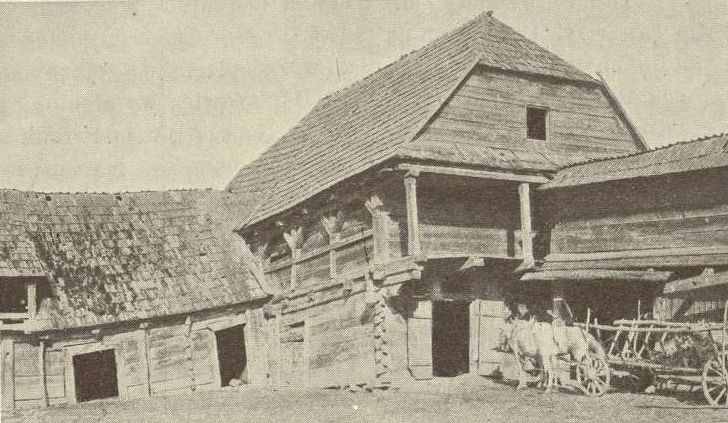
Ulanowski's tannery (Garbarnia Ulanowskich) in Kazimierz Dolny

The history of Kazimierz Dolny dates back to the 11th century, when on one of the local hills there was a Benedictine settlement called Wietrzna Gora. In 1181, Prince Casimir II the Just handed the settlement to Norbertine nuns from Kraków’s district of Zwierzyniec. The nuns changed its name to Kazimierz, in honor of the prince. For the first time, the name Kazimierz appears in chronicles in 1249. Later on, the adjective Dolny (Lower) was added, to distinguish the town from the Jewish town Kazimierz - now a district of Kraków. In the early 14th century, the village became a royal possession, and King Władysław I the Elbow-high founded there a parish church in 1325.

The foundation of the town is attributed to Władysław's son, King Casimir III the Great, who granted the town rights in the first half of the 14th century. Later, King Władysław II Jagiełło modernized Kazimierz Dolny, creating a modern town, with a market square and streets. At that time, the decision was taken not to build any houses on the northern side of the market square, so as not to obstruct the view of the church and the castle.

In 1501, Kazimierz Dolny became the home of a starosta, and the town was passed over to the noble Firlej family, remaining in its hands until 1644. The Firlejs twice rebuilt the town and the castle, after the fires of 1561 and 1585. They cared about privileged status of Kazimierz Dolny, as a merchant town, located along the busy waterway of the Vistula. In 1628, Franciscan friars settled in Kazimierz, building a monastery and expanding the church.

The town's golden age ended in February 1656 (see Deluge), when Swedish troops under King Charles X Gustav burned and ransacked it. The number of inhabitants declined, and King John III Sobieski tried to improve the situation, by allowing in 1677 Armenian, Greek and Jewish merchants to settle there. Meanwhile, the profitable Vistula river trade came to an end, as there was no demand for Polish grains in Western Europe. In the late 18th century, as a result of the Partitions of Poland, Kazimierz Dolny was cut from the port of Gdańsk and turned into a town of minor importance.

From the late 19th century, more affluent residents of Lublin and Warsaw started to build properties in the area. Spas and villas were constructed, and in 1927, already in the Second Polish Republic, Kazimierz Dolny once again became a town. Partly destroyed in World War II, it was rebuilt, and on September 8, 1994, its center was officially recognized as a historical monument.

In 2024, Kazimierz Dolny was placed by Travel + Leisure magazine on the list of Europe's 22 most beautiful small towns and villages.

Historical images

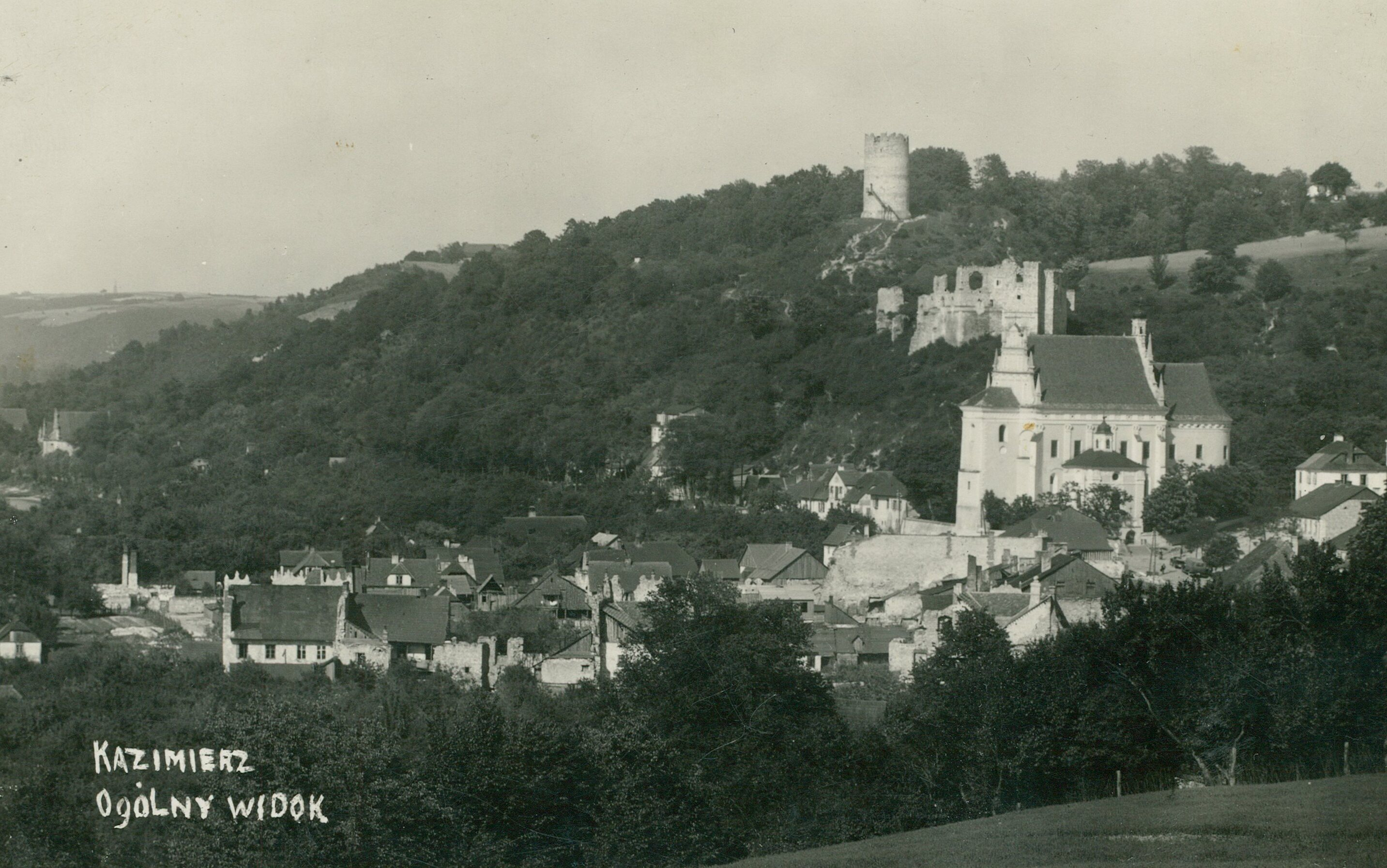
Kazimierz Dolny, 1933–1937

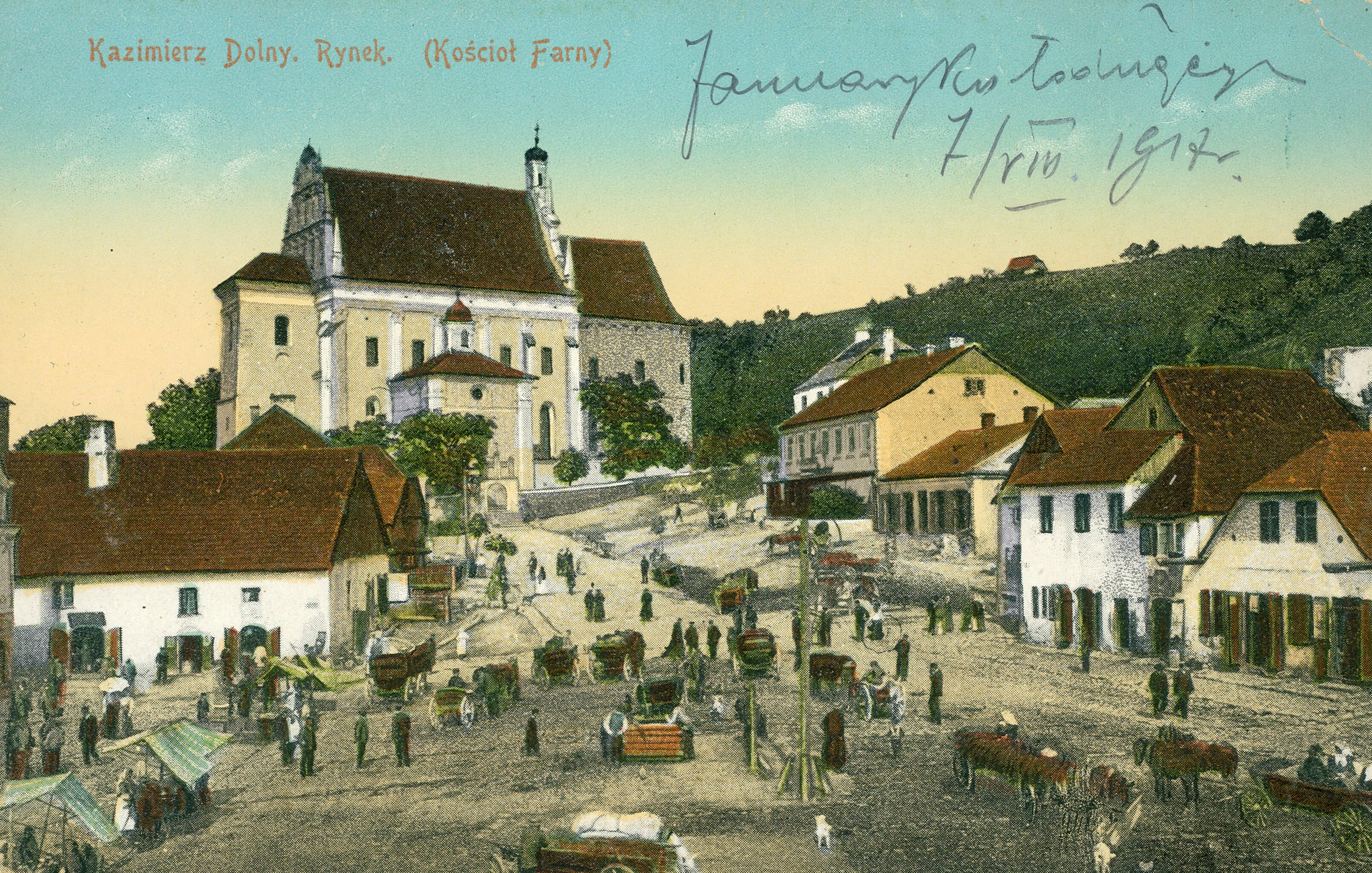
Market square, 1914

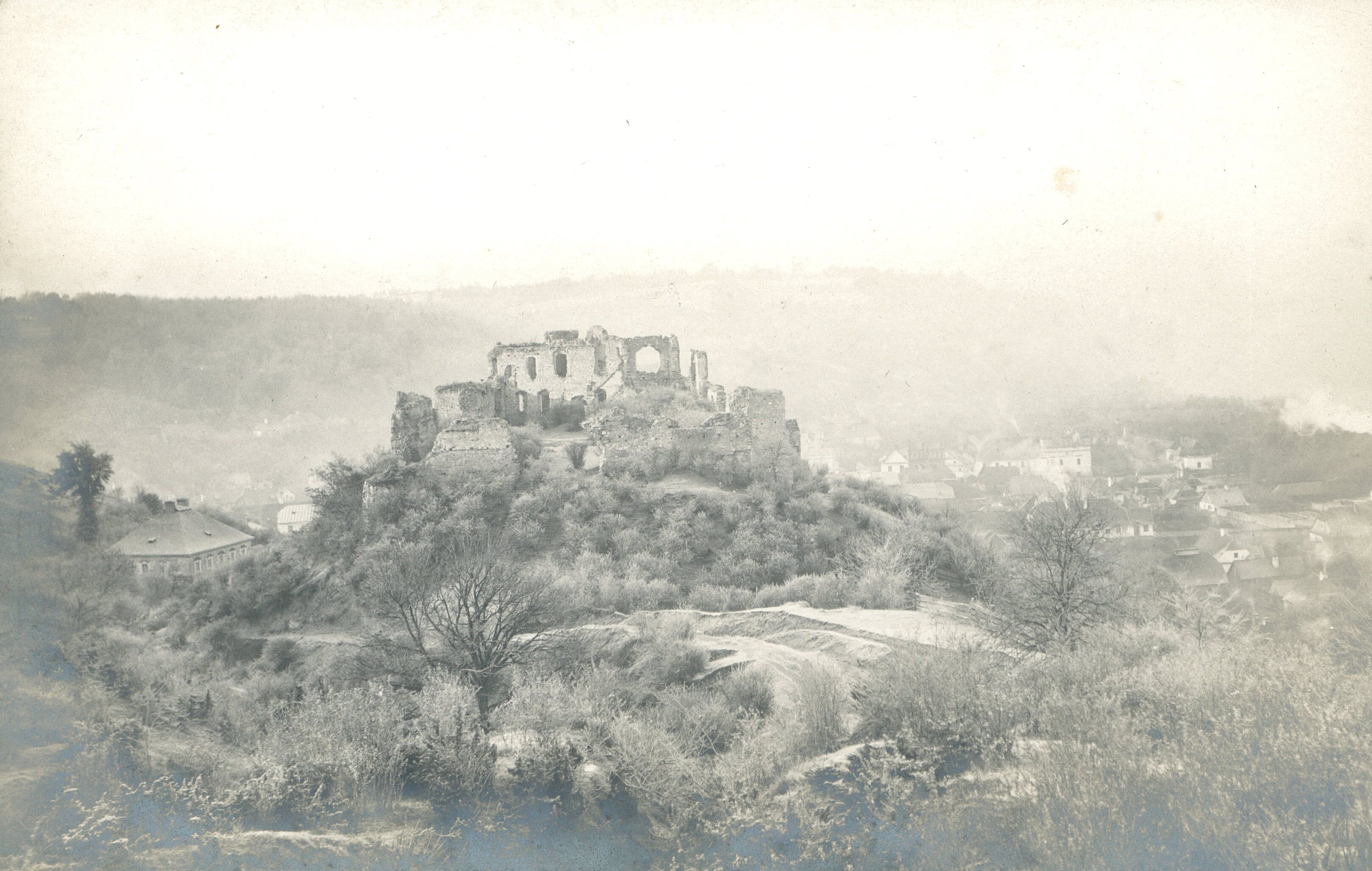
Castle, post 1906

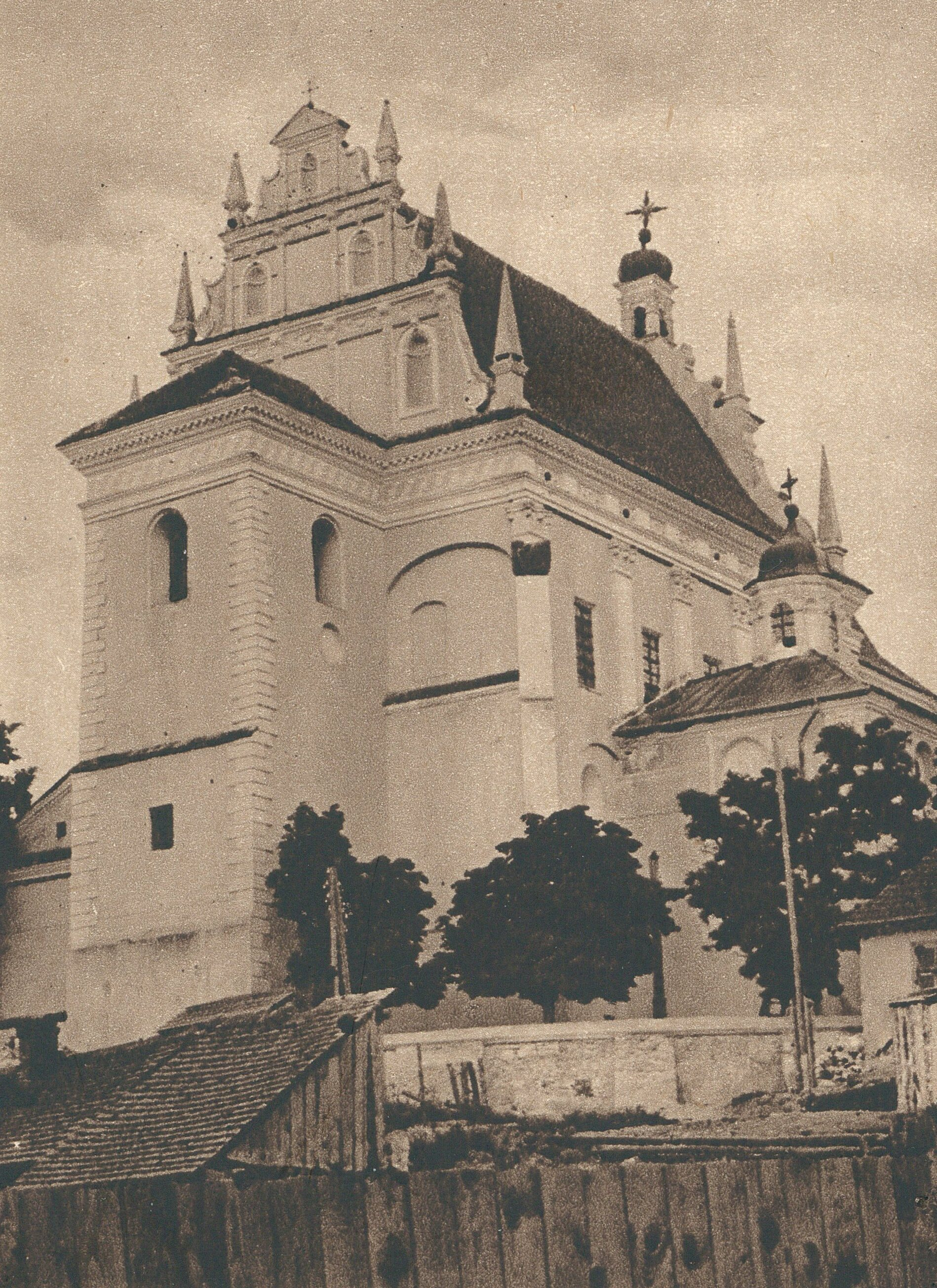
Parish church, 1939

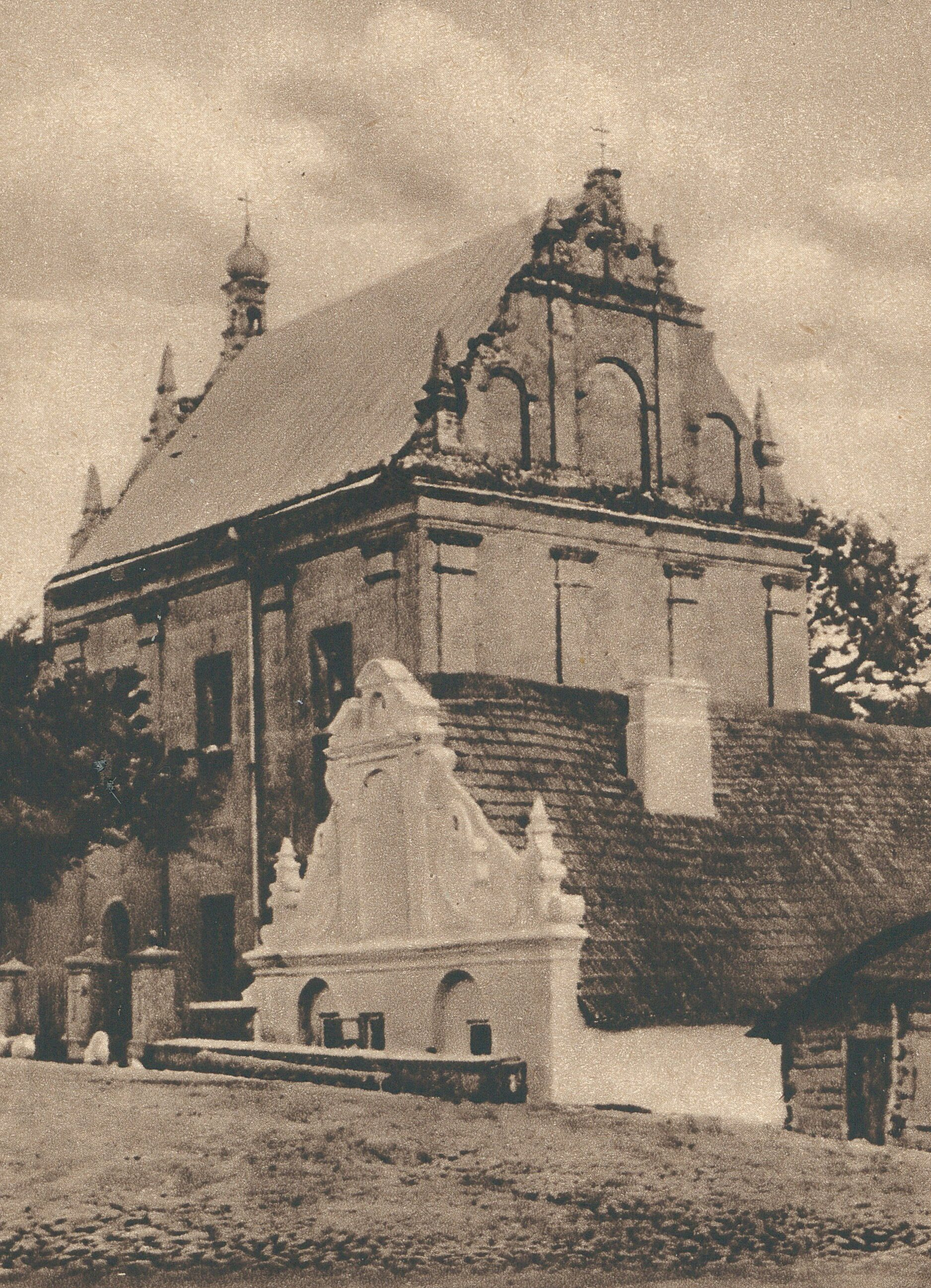
Church of St. Anne, 1939

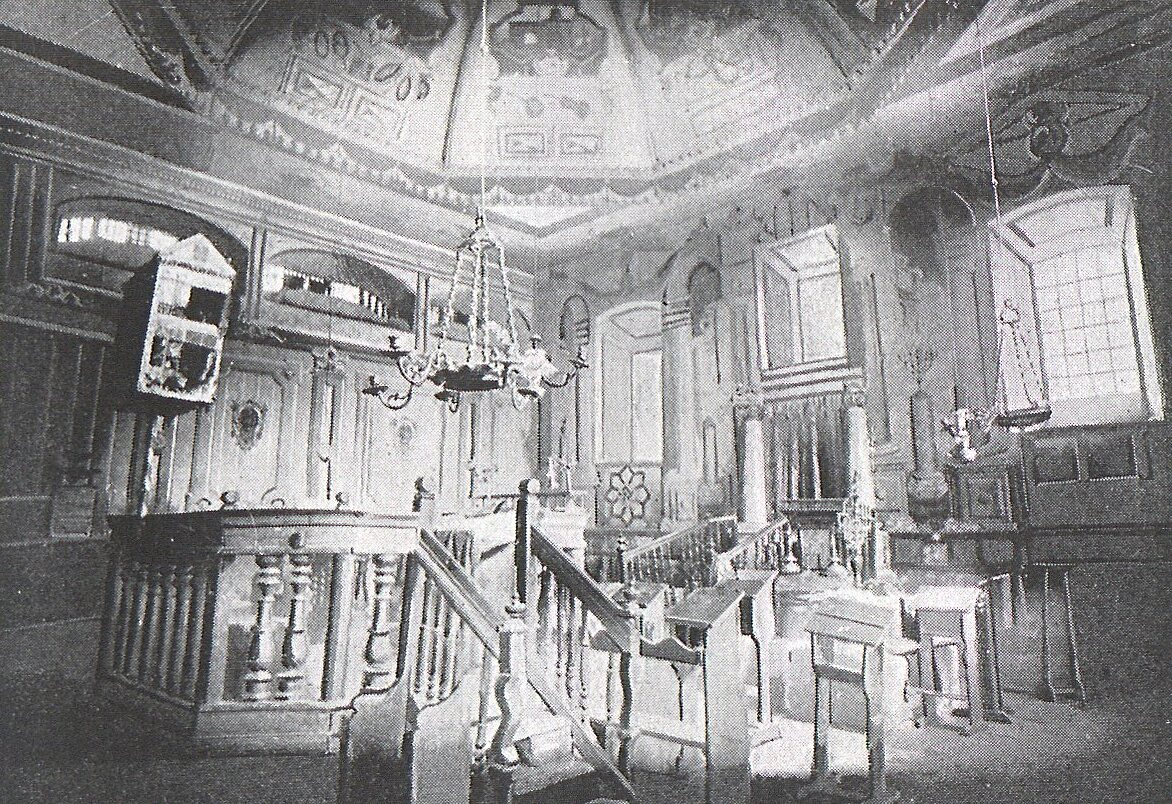
Synagogue - interior, ca 1901

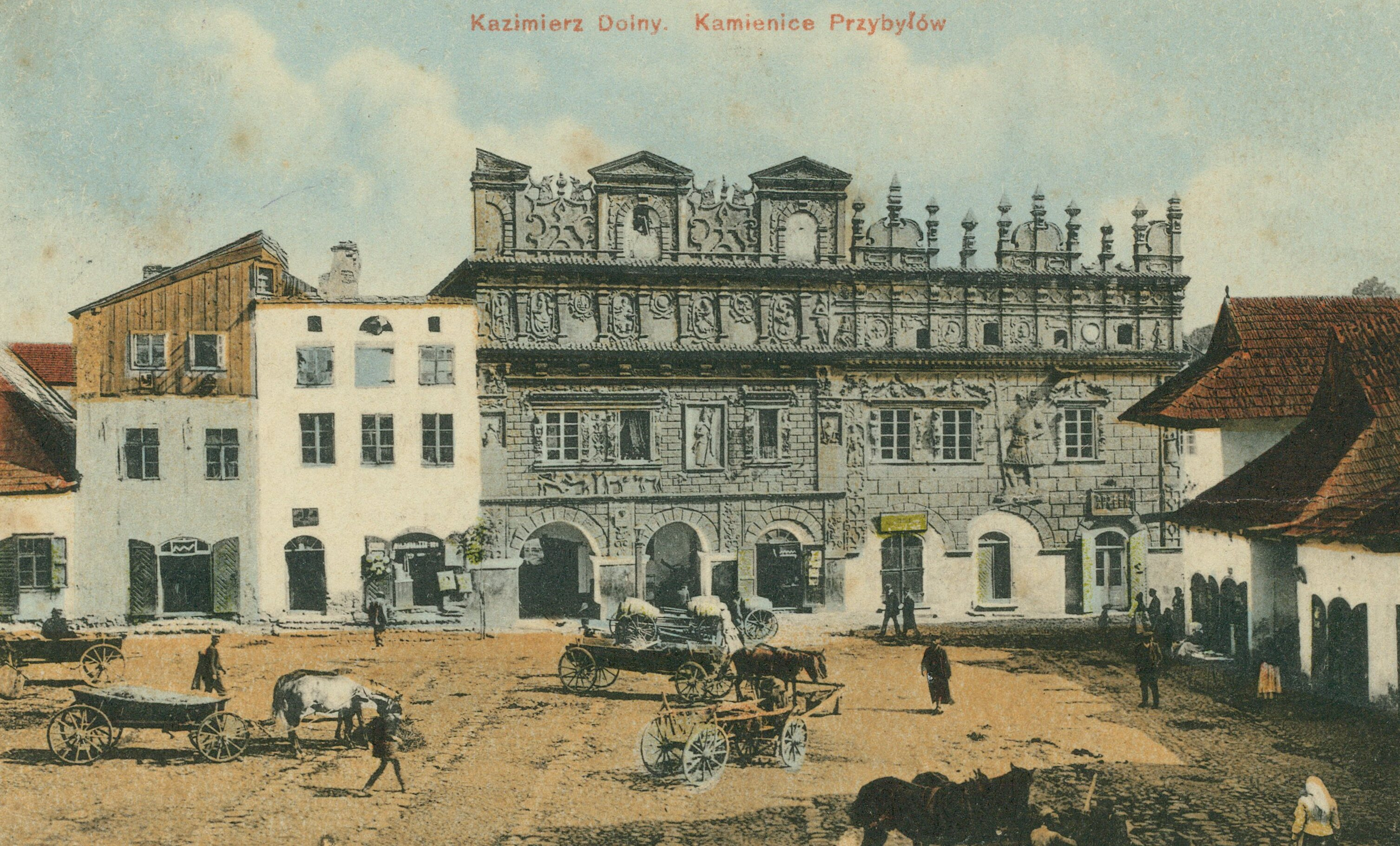
Przybyła brothers tenement houses, 1914

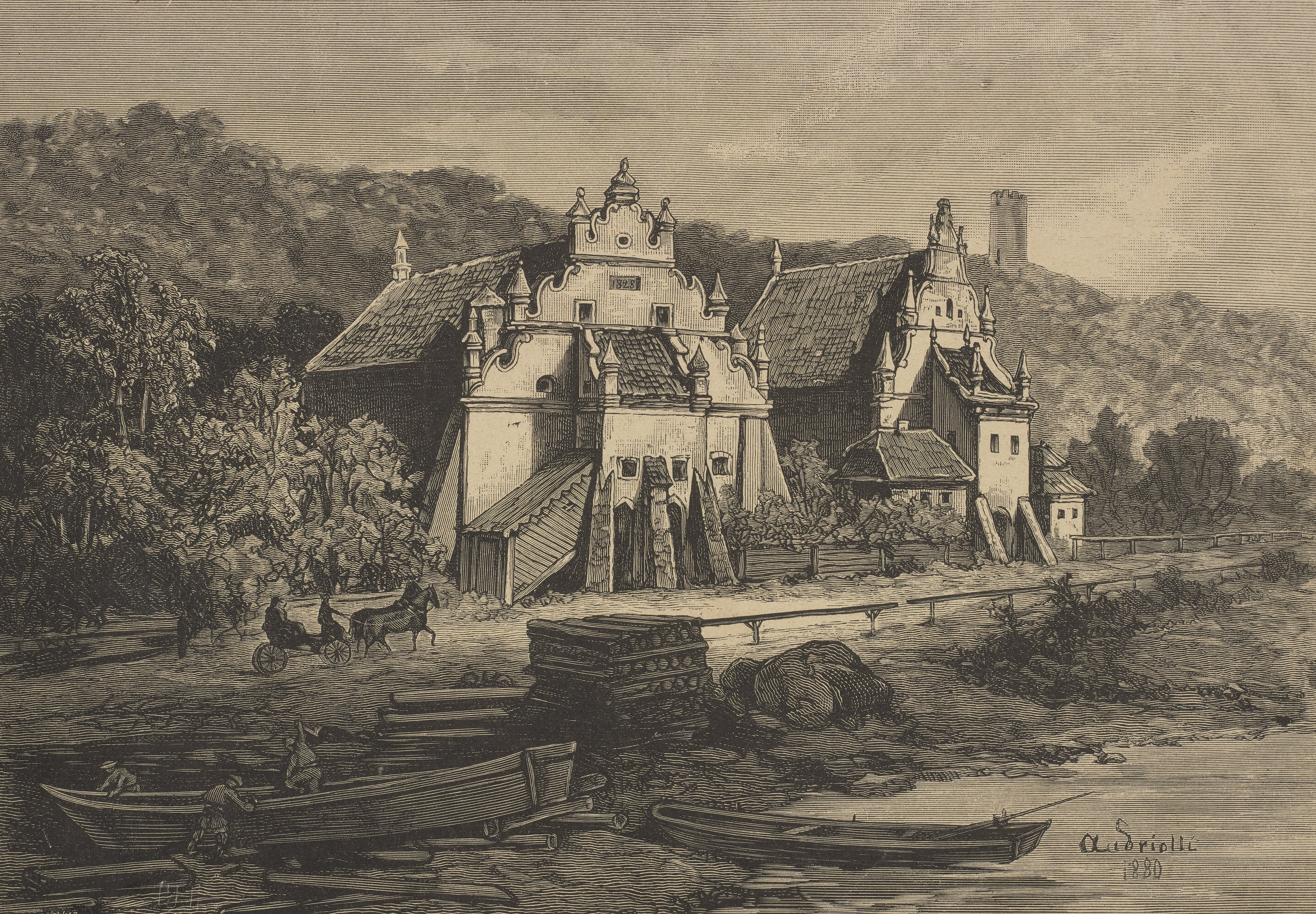
granaries, post 1880

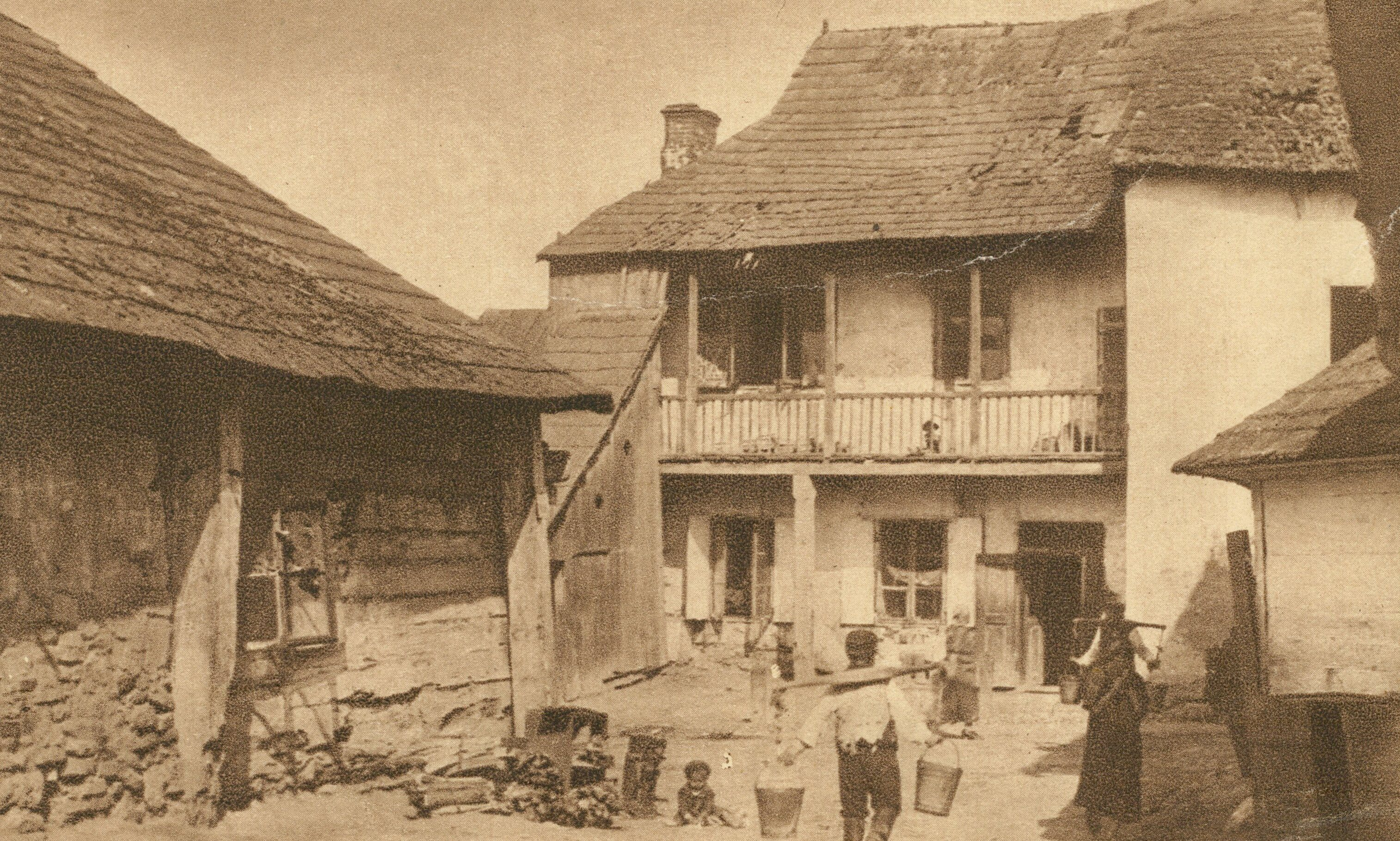
Old house, before 1939

=== Jewish history ===
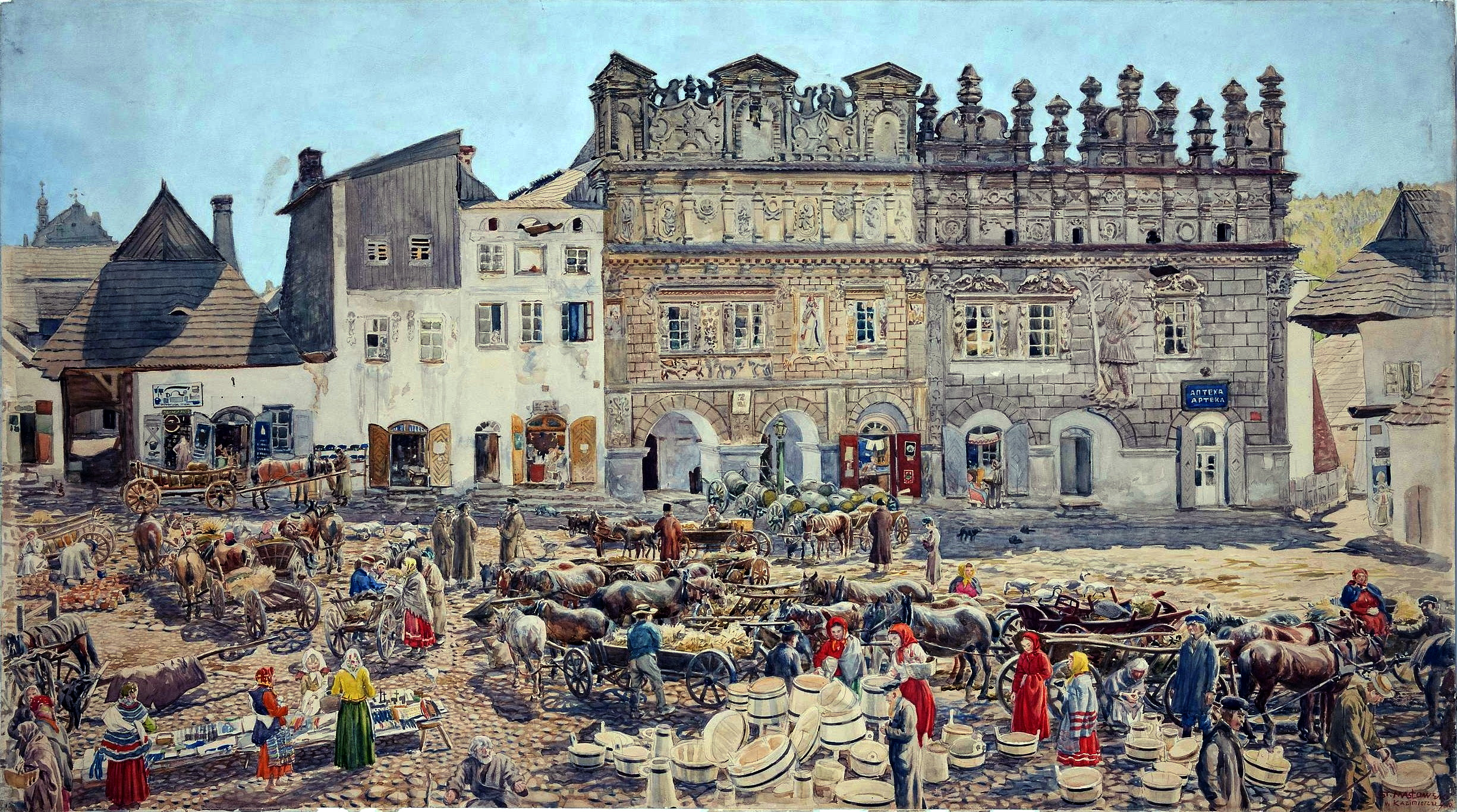
Market Square in Kazimierz Dolny in 1899, watercolor by Stanisław Masłowski

A small Jewish community was present in the city from the time of Casimir III the Great in the 14th century. The king granted the Jews a writ of rights which caused the town to become a focal point for Jewish immigration. When John III Sobieski became King in 1674, he granted the Jews of Poland a respite from taxes. Sobieski also reconfirmed for the Jews all the rights they had been granted by previous kings. During his reign, the housing restrictions were abolished and the Jewish community began to flourish again.

In the 19th century, Yehezkel Taub, a disciple of the "Seer of Lublin", founded the Hasidic dynasty of Kuzmir in the town.

Between the First and Second World Wars, the Jewish population was about 1,400, half the total population of the town. The town's picturesque surroundings were chosen to film scenes for the shtetl-based 1937 Yiddish film The Dybbuk. It was also a location for the similar 1936 film Yiddle With His Fiddle.

The Germans invaded Kazimierz Dolny in September 1939. The population at that time included about 1800 Jews, slightly less than 40 percent of the population. During the occupation, a Judenrat (Jewish Council) was established in the town which was forced to oversee the German requirements of forced labor of the town's Jews. This included road reconstruction, rock quarrying, and menial tasks serving the Nazis. They were forced to pave roads using tombstones from the local Jewish cemetery. In 1940, the Germans established a ghetto, bringing all the Jews from the surrounding Puławy County to live in the ghetto. In 1942, those Jews who had survived hunger, disease and slave labor were taken to Belzec where they were gassed on arrival. At the end of 1942, the town was officially declared "free of Jews". Fewer than twenty of Kazimierz Dolny's Jewish inhabitants are thought to have survived the war. After the Holocaust, a memorial wall was erected using tombstones from the Jewish cemetery that survived.

One of the most famous Jewish residents of the town was the painter and sculptor Chaim Goldberg. Another Jewish scion of the city was Polish-American journalist Samuel Leib Shneiderman.

In 2013, the Pardes Festival, which celebrates Jewish culture, was inaugurated in Kazimierz Dolny.

== Points of interest ==
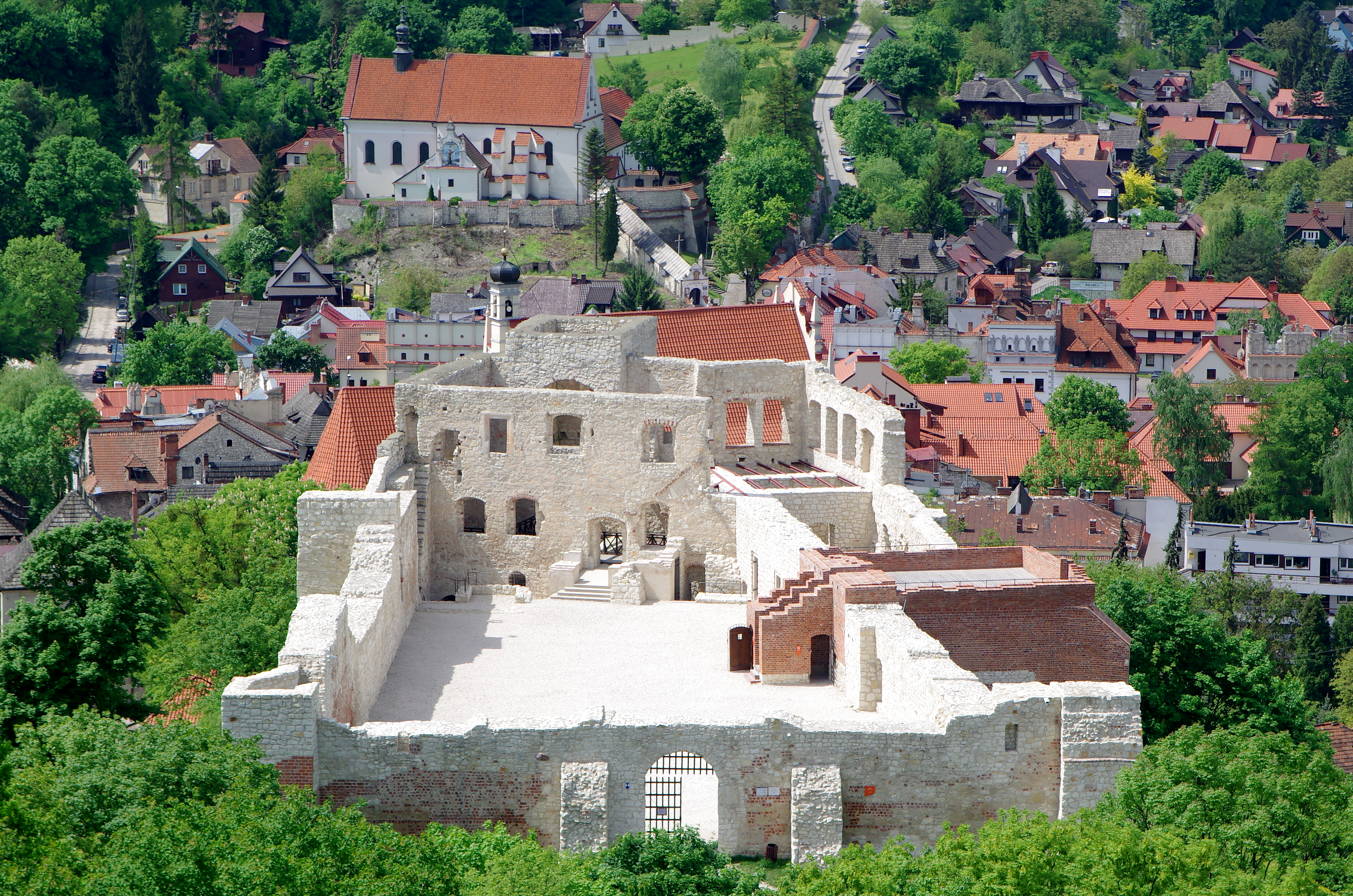
Kazimierz Dolny Castle

Notable historical buildings located in Kazimierz Dolny include:

- Parish church of St Bartholomew and John the Baptist (1586–1589), with 1620 organs, and 1615 pulpit,
- St Anne's Church (1671) and Holy Spirit hospital (1635),
- St Mary's Church (1589) and monastery (1638–68),
- Ruins of the castle (14th-16th century),
- Defensive tower (13th or 14th century),
- Several houses by the architect Karol Siciński, including one built by Kazimierz Ołdakowski
- Tenement houses (early 17th century),
- Several historic granaries (16th and 17th centuries)
- Synagogue

== Film and Art Festival ==
Kazimierz Dolny is also a place of a prominent Two Riversides Film and Art Festival ("Festiwal Filmu i Sztuki Dwa Brzegi") which is held every year during the month of August drawing many film lovers from around the world. The town has been the location of several films.

== Gallery ==
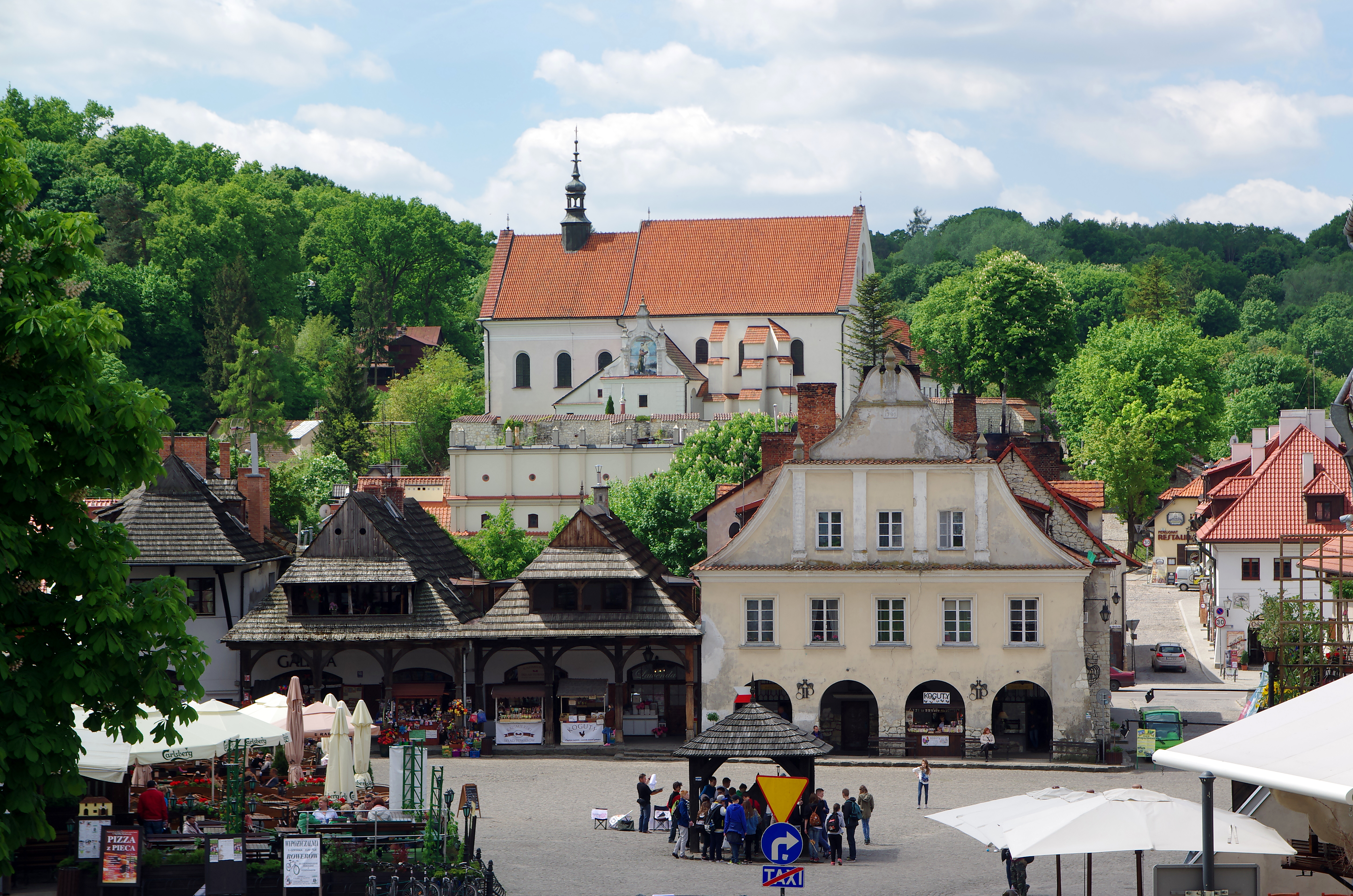
Market Square with Church of the Annunciation in the background

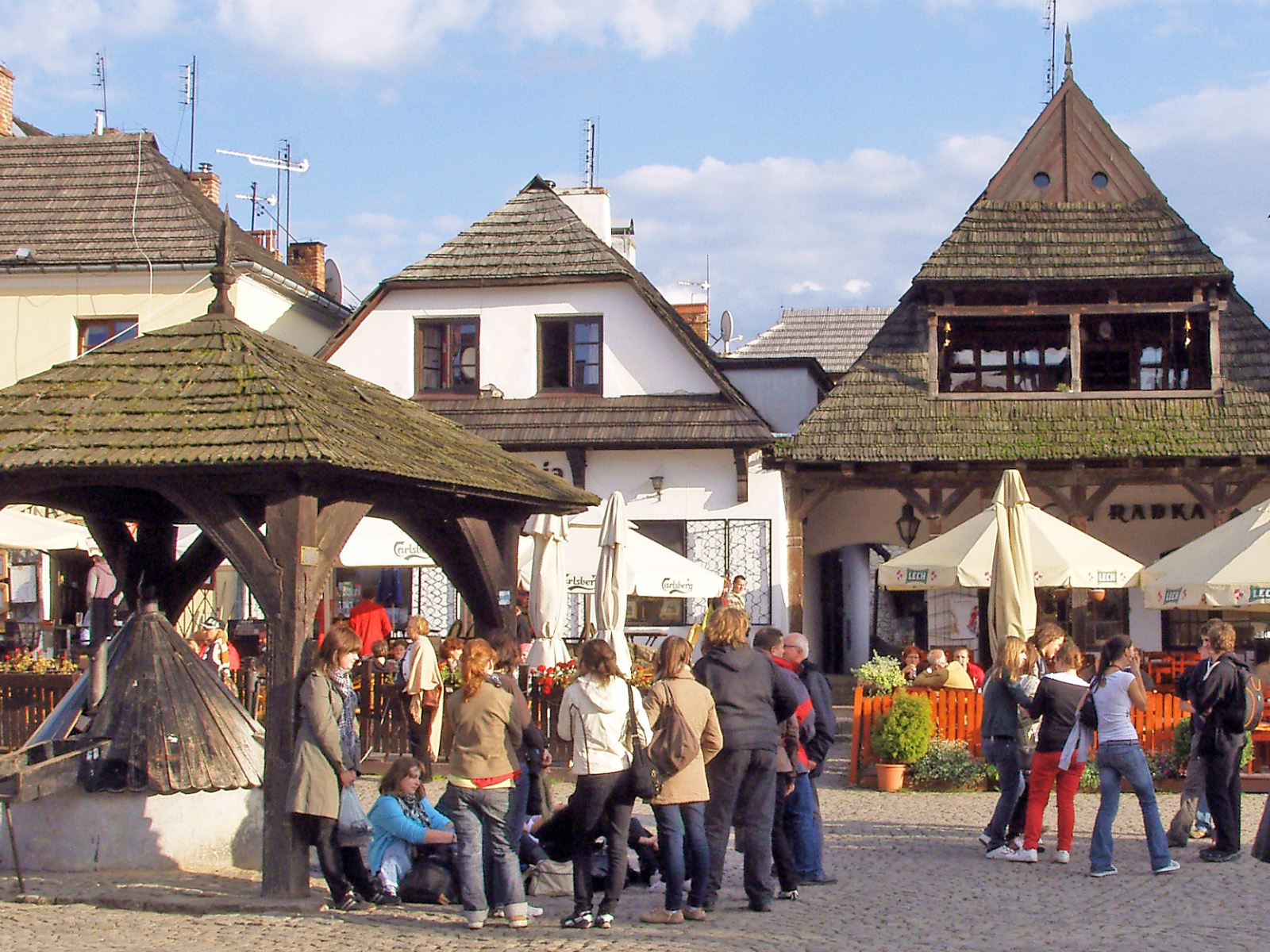
Historic well at the Market Square

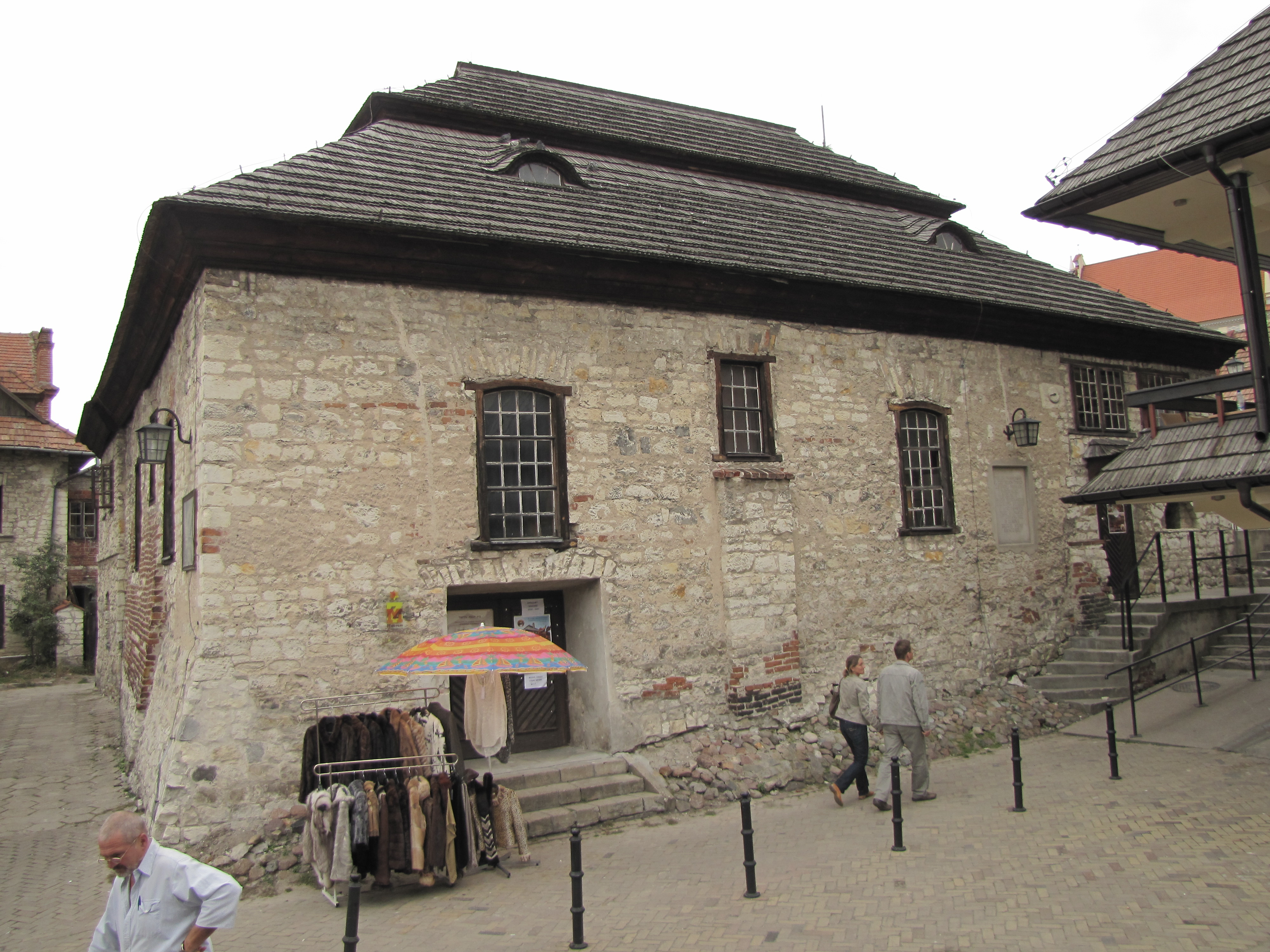
Old Synagogue

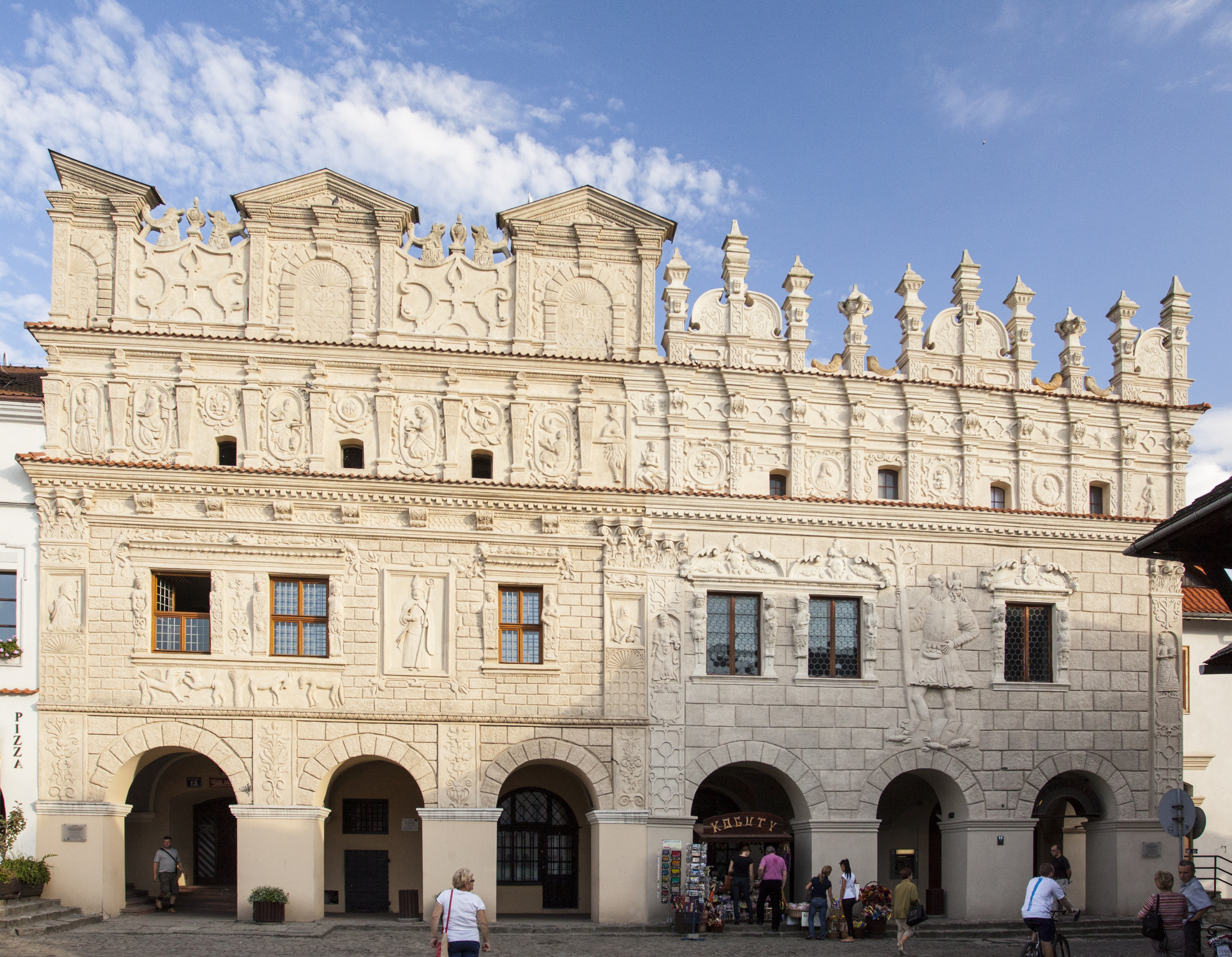
St. Nicholas (left) and St. Christopher (right) townhouses

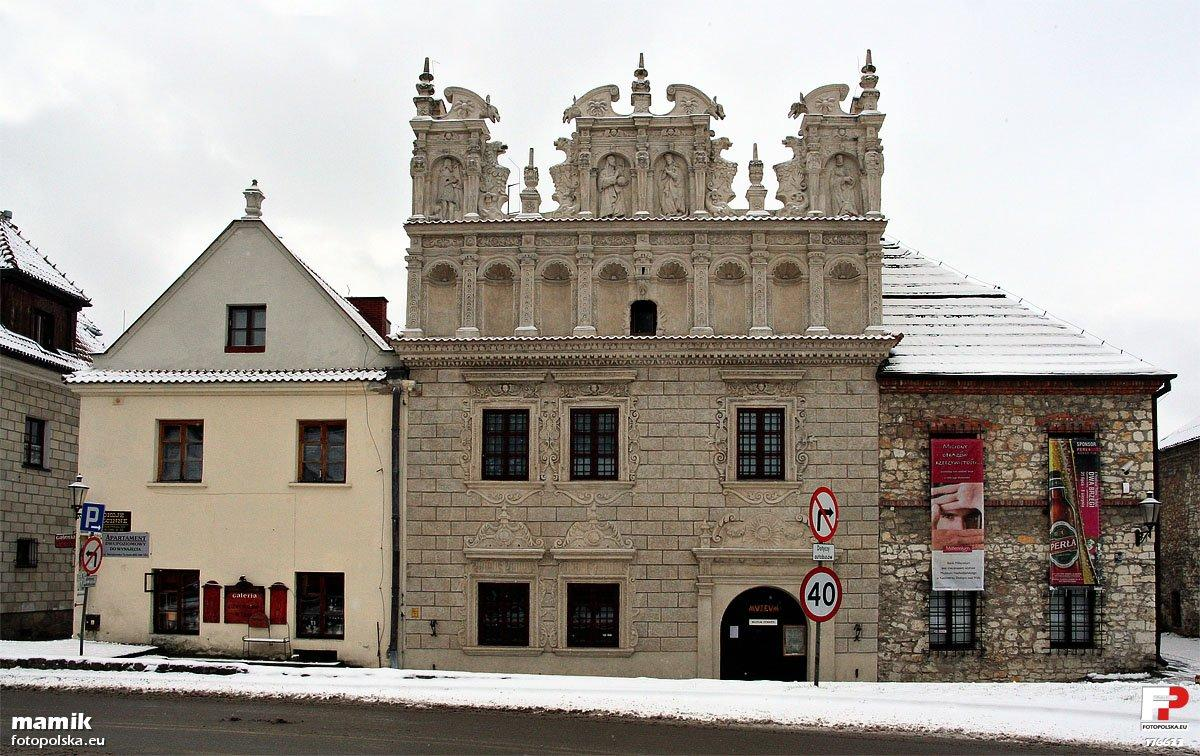
Celejowska townhouse

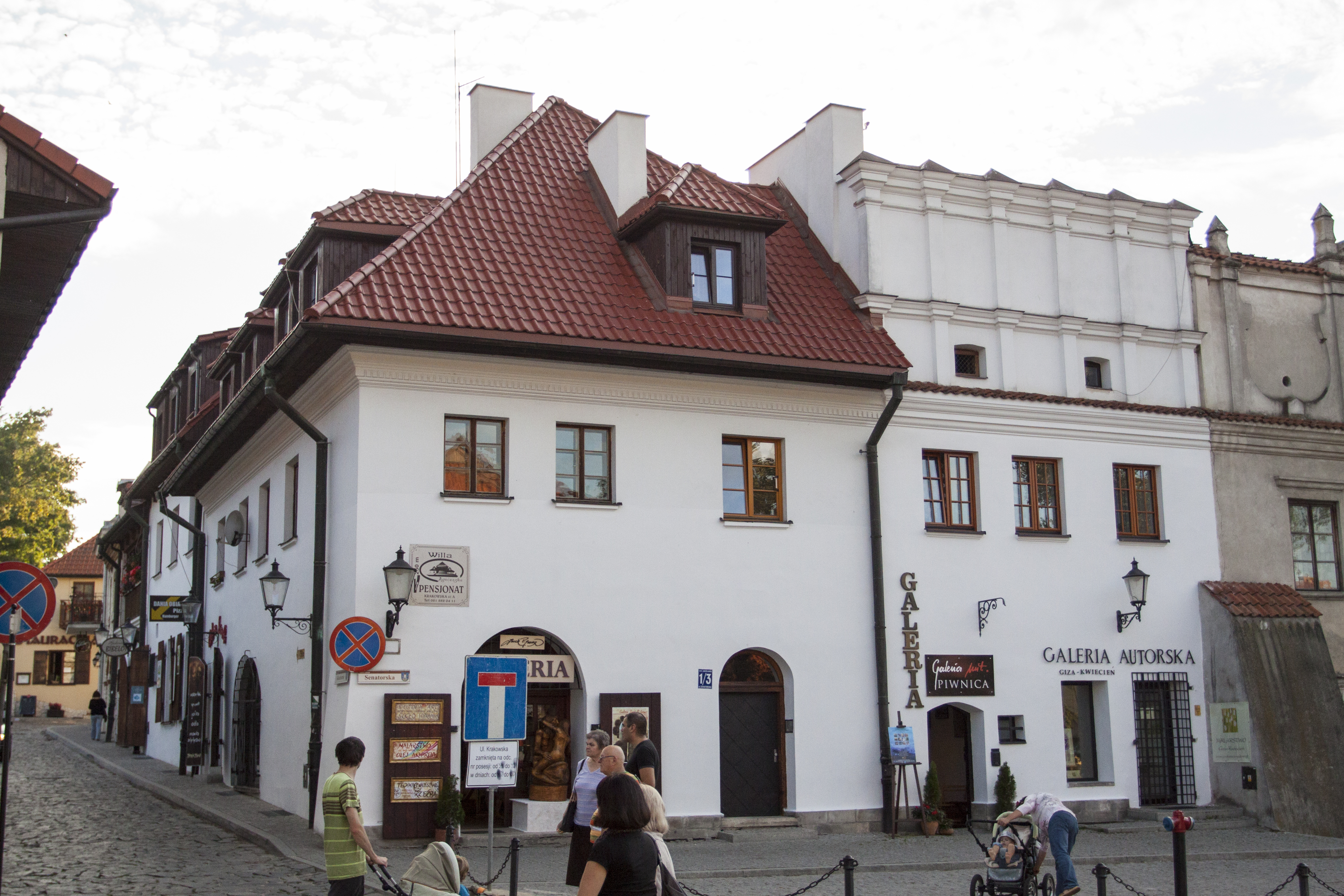
Senatorska street

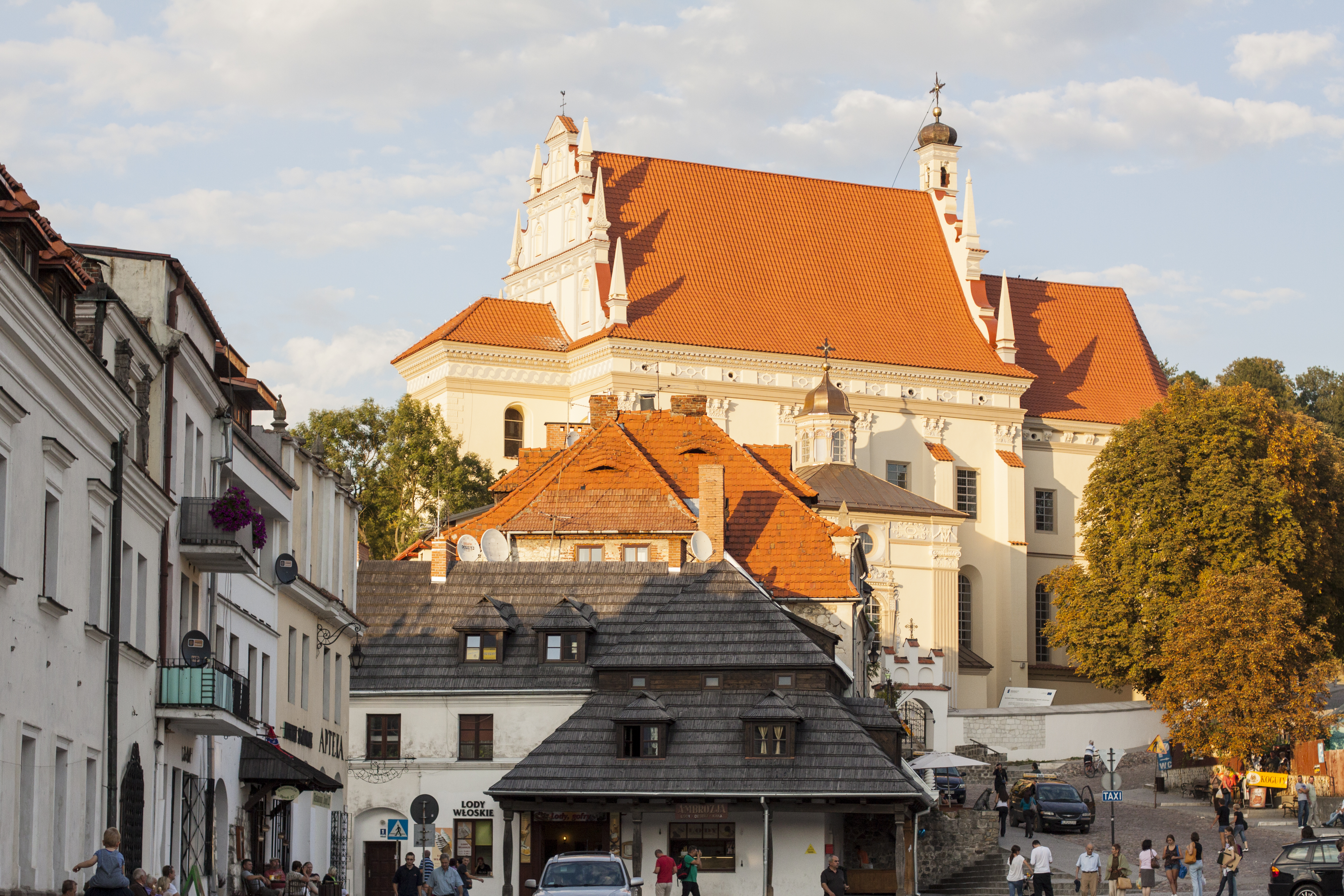
Parish Church of St. John the Baptist

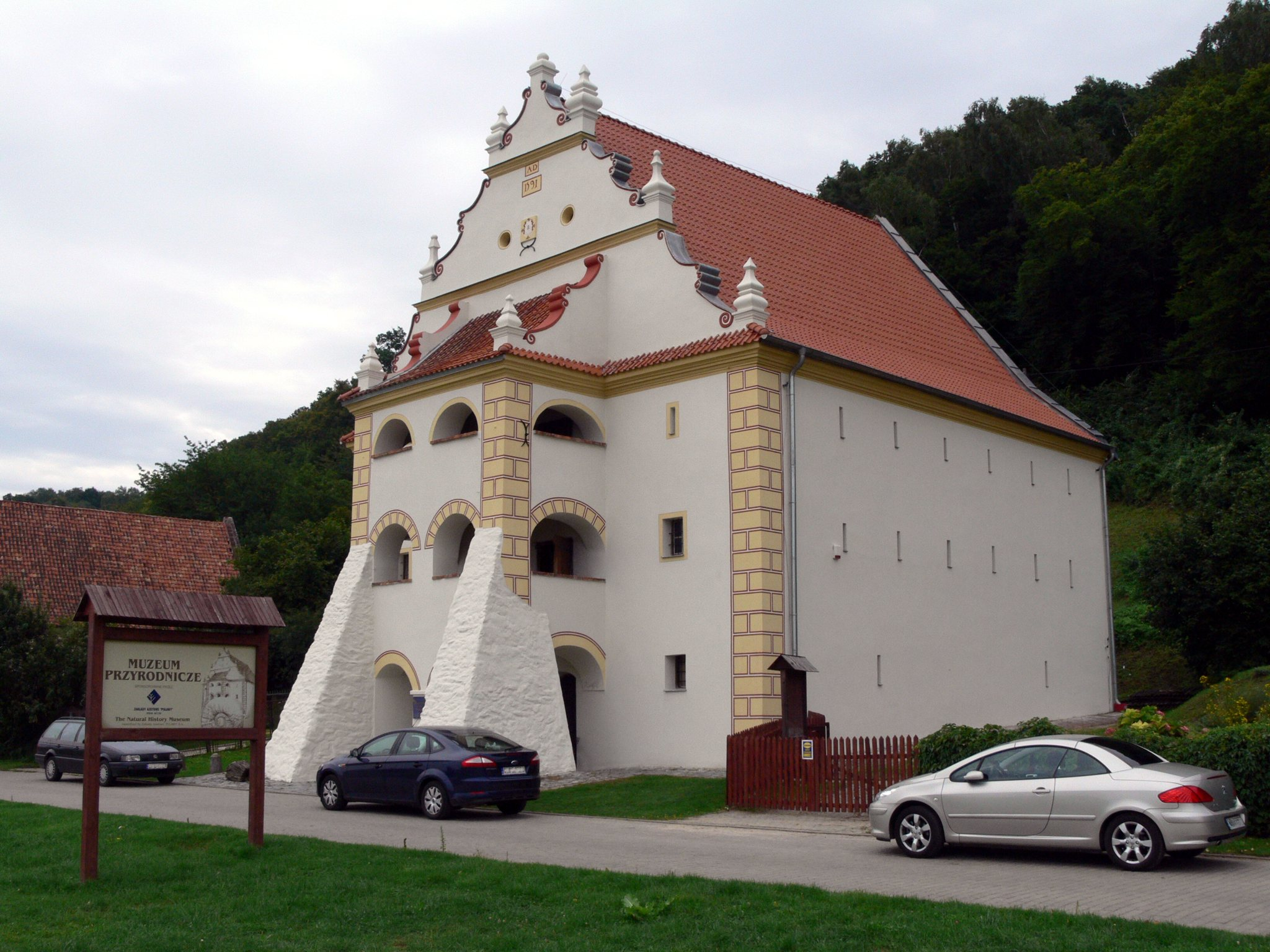
The Ulanowski Granary

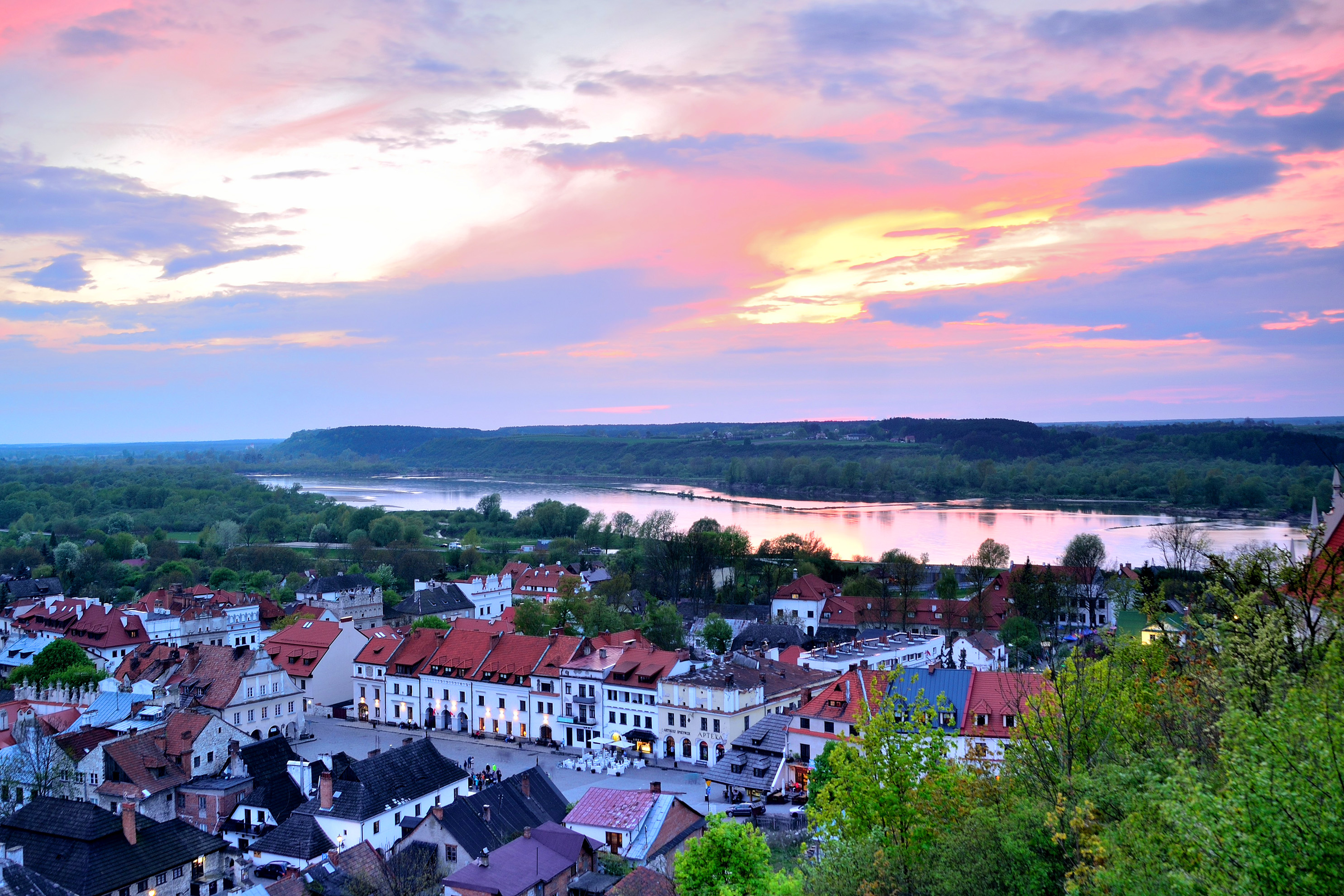
Panorama of the town

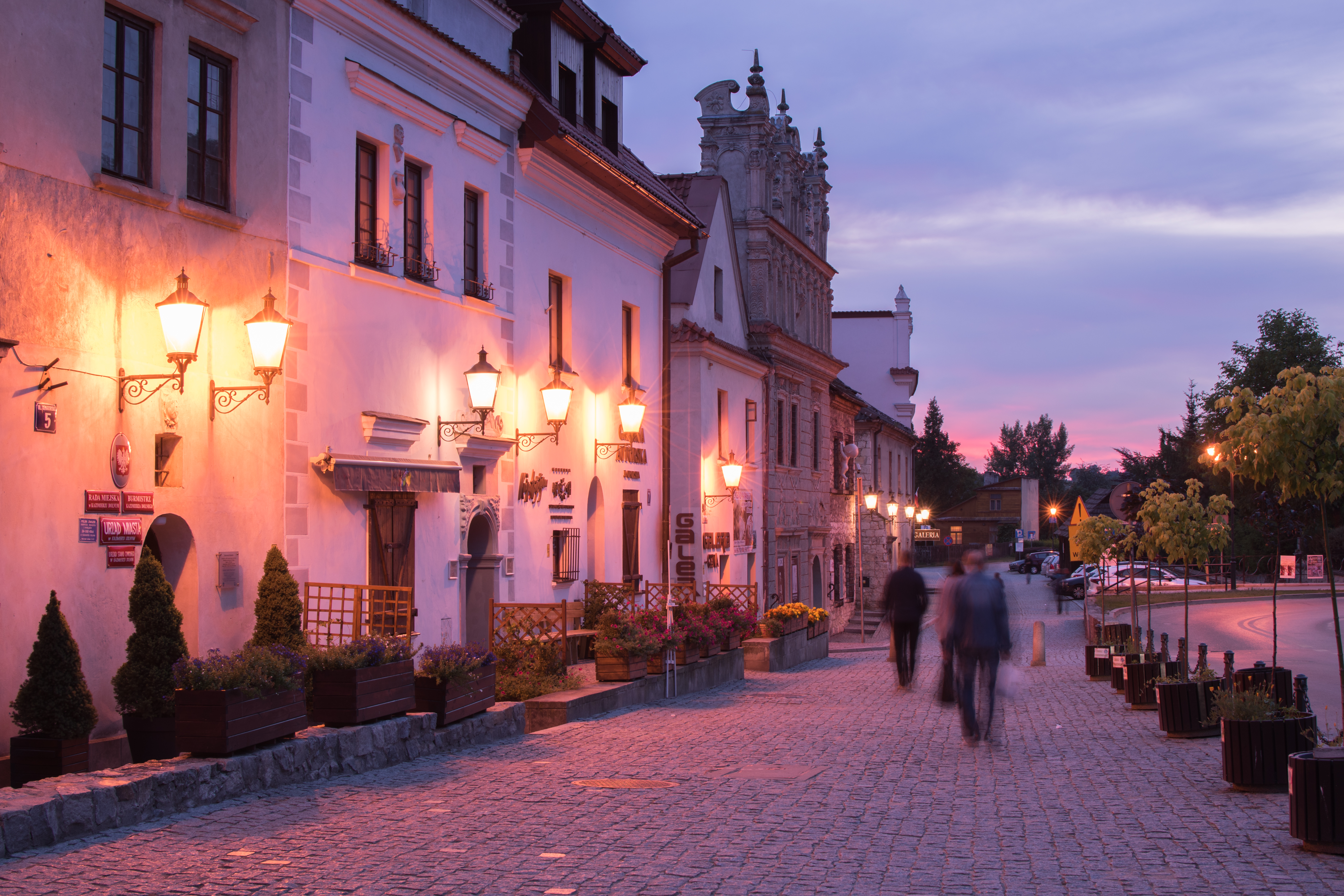
Town centre

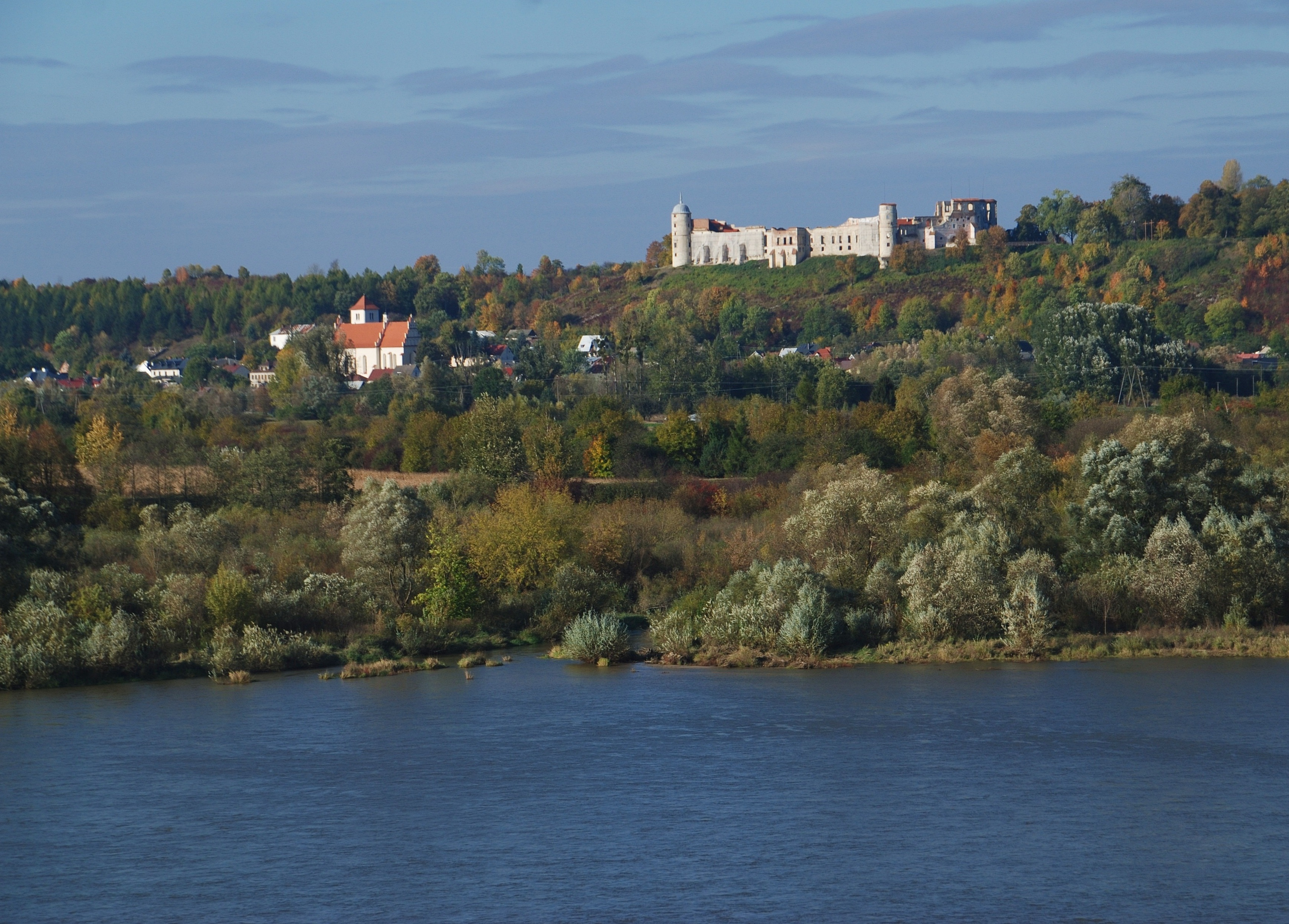
Janowiec Castle

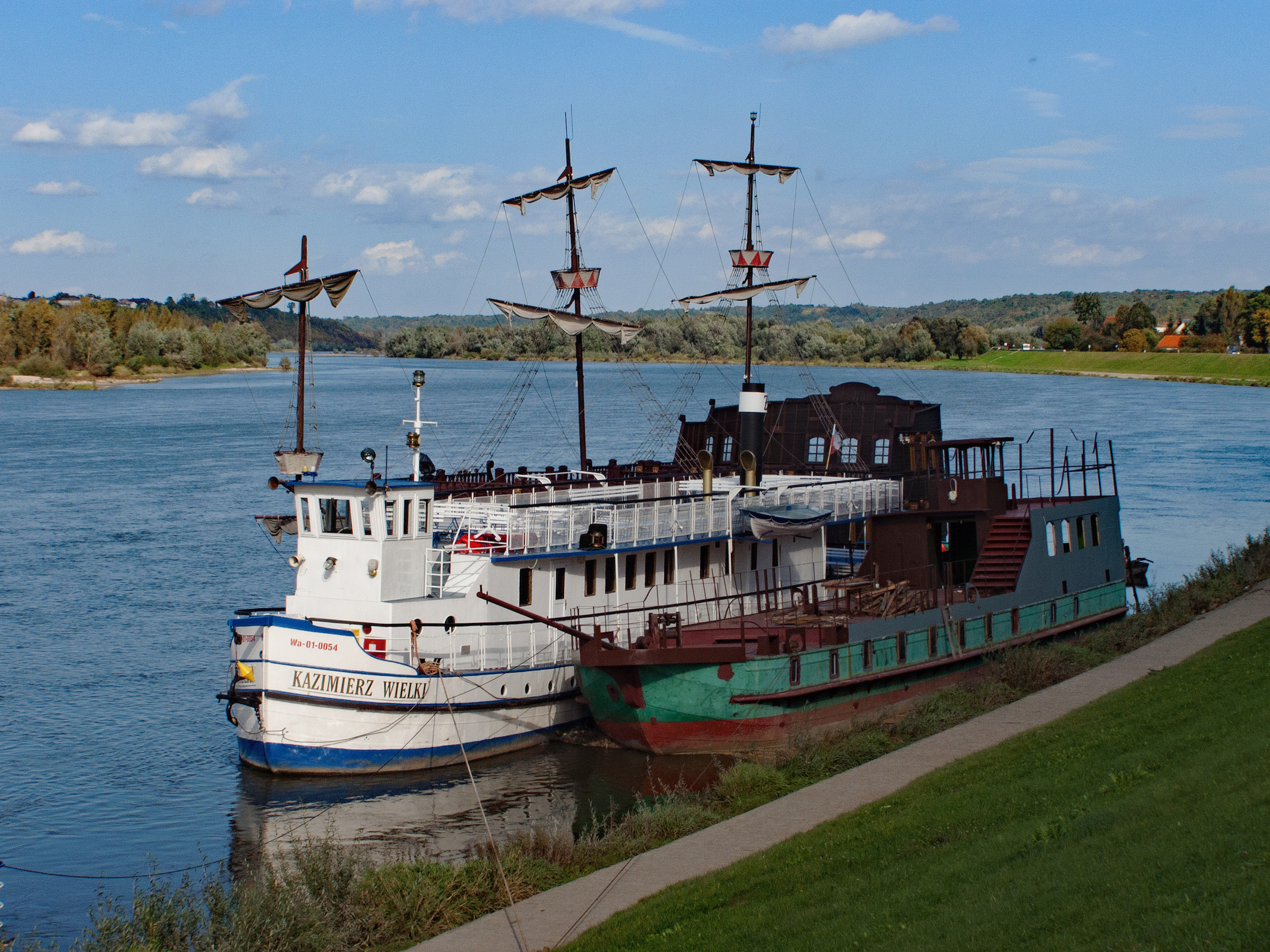
Vistula River in Kazimierz Dolny

== Twin towns ==
Kazimierz Dolny is twinned with:

- Szklarska Poręba (Poland)
- Hortobágy (Hungary)
- Staufen im Breisgau (Germany)
- Berlin-Steglitz (Germany)
- Pahiatua (New Zealand)

== See also ==
- Tourism in Poland
- Kazimierz Landscape Park
