= Polish Enlightenment =

Aspect of Polish history in the 18th-19th centuries

The ideas of the Age of Enlightenment in Poland were developed later than in Western Europe, as the Polish bourgeoisie was weaker, and szlachta (nobility) culture (Sarmatism) together with the Polish–Lithuanian Commonwealth political system (Golden Liberty) were in deep crisis. The period of Polish Enlightenment began in the 1730s–40s, peaked in the reign of Poland's last king, Stanisław August Poniatowski (1764–1795), went into decline with the Third Partition of Poland (1795) – a national tragedy inspiring a short period of sentimental writing – and ended in 1822, replaced by Romanticism.

== History ==
Polish Enlightenment, while sharing many common qualities with the classical Enlightenment movements of Western Europe, also differed from them in many important aspects. Much of the thought of the Western Enlightenment evolved under the oppressive absolute monarchies and was dedicated towards fighting for more freedom. Western thinkers desired Montesquieu's separation and balance of powers to restrict the nearly unlimited power of their monarchs. Polish Enlightenment, however, developed in a very different background. The Polish political system was almost the opposite of the absolute monarchy: Polish kings were elected and their position was very weak, with most of the powers in the hands of the parliament (Sejm). Polish reforms desired the elimination of laws that transformed their system into a near-anarchy, resulting from abuse of consensus voting in Sejm (liberum veto) that paralyzed the Commonwealth, especially during the times of the Wettin dynasty, reducing Poland from a major European player to the puppet of its neighbours. Thus, while men of the Enlightenment in France and Prussia wrote about the need for more checks and balances on their kings, Polish Enlightenment was geared towards fighting the abuses stemming from too many checks and balances.

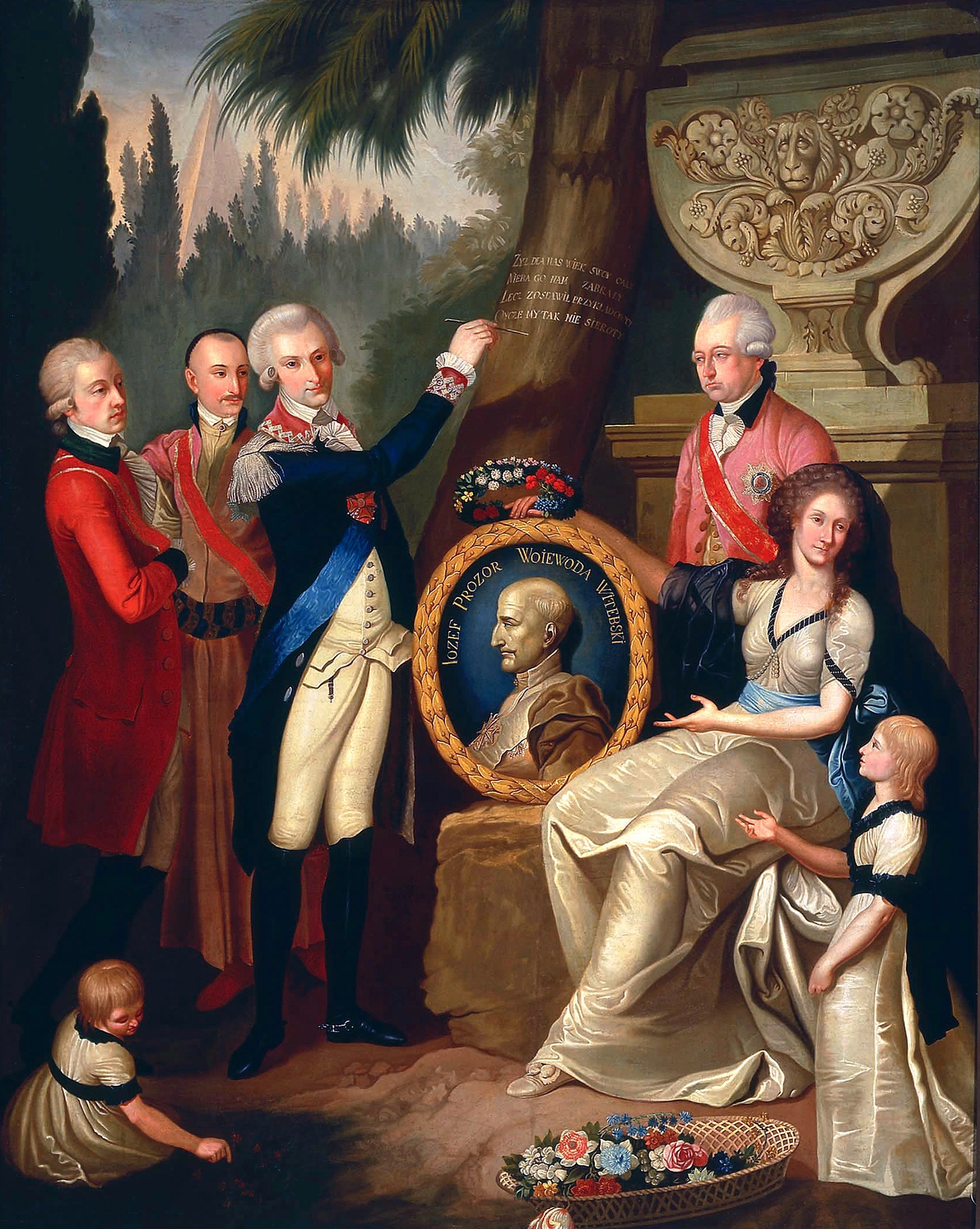
Portrait of the Prozor Family, by Franciszek Smuglewicz, 1789

The differences did not end there. Townsfolk and bourgeoisie dominated Western Enlightenment movement, while in the Commonwealth most of the reformers came from szlachta (nobility). Commonwealth szlachta (forming 10% of its population) considered the idea of equality to be one of the foundations of its culture, and reformers fought to expand it towards other social classes. Religious tolerance was an ideal of the szlachta.

=== Constitution of 1791 ===
Ideas of that period led eventually to the Constitution of May 3, 1791 and other reforms (like the creation of the Commission of National Education, first ministry of education in the world) which attempted to transform the Commonwealth into a modern constitutional monarchy. Although attempts of political reform were thwarted by the civil war (Targowica Confederation) and military intervention of the Commonwealth's neighbours, ending in the partitions of Poland, the cultural impact of that period persevered Polish culture for many years.

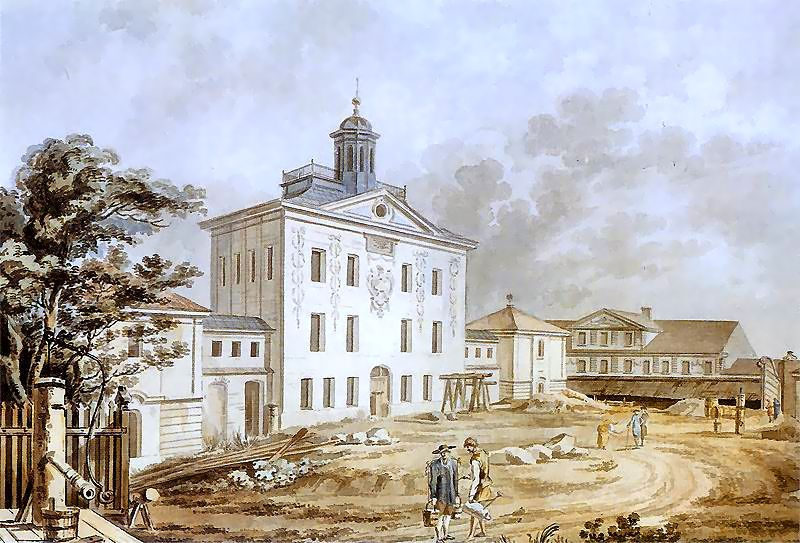
Załuski Library, Poland's first public library, by Zygmunt Vogel, 1801

The ideas of the Polish Enlightenment also had a significant impact abroad. From the Bar Confederation (1768) through the period of the Great Sejm and until the aftermath of the Constitution of May 3, 1791, Poland experienced a large output of political, particularly constitutional, writing.

Important institutions of the Enlightenment included the National Theatre founded in 1765 in Warsaw by King Stanisław August Poniatowski; and in the field of advanced learning: the Commission of National Education established by the Sejm in 1773; the Society for Elementary Books; as well as the Corps of Cadets (Knight's military school) among others. In expanding the field of knowledge, there was the Society of Friends of Science set up in 1800 soon after the Partitions. Popular newspapers included Monitor and Zabawy Przyjemne i Pożyteczne (Games Pleasant and Useful).

== Notable persons ==
- Wojciech Bogusławski - father of Polish theatre
- Franciszek Bohomolec - poet, writer, publisher, teacher
- Tadeusz Czacki - education, economy, founder of Towarzystwo Przyjaciół Nauk and Liceum Krzemienieckie
- Joachim Chreptowicz - Last Grand Chancellor of the Lithuania, journalist, poet, translator, and physiocrat
- Jakub Jasiński - poet, general, radical supporter of revolution
- Franciszek Salezy Jezierski - writer, political activist
- Franciszek Karpiński - poet
- Franciszek Kniaźnin (Franciszek Dionizy Kniażin) - poet, writer
- Hugo Kołłątaj - priest, social and political activist, political thinker, historian and philosopher
- Stanisław Konarski - precursor of education reform, author of O skutecznym rad sposobie
- Onufry Kopczyński - teacher, precursor of Polish grammar
- Tadeusz Kościuszko - military engineer, statesman, revolutionary.
- Michał Dymitr Krajewski - writer, educational activist
- Ignacy Krasicki - one of Poland's greatest poets, writer, bishop, co-organiser of Thursday dinners
- Stanisław Leszczyński - king of Poland, political activist, writer (Głos wolny wolność ubezpieczający)
- Samuel Bogumił Linde - chairman of Towarzystwo do Ksiąg Elementarnych, creator of Słownik Języka Polskiego
- Adam Naruszewicz - poet, translator, historian
- Julian Ursyn Niemcewicz - poet, playwright, independence activist
- Jan Piotr Norblin - painter
- Józef Maksymilian Ossoliński - writer, social, science and cultural activist, founder of Zakład Narodowy im. Ossolińskich
- Grzegorz Piramowicz - writer, philosopher, educational activist
- Stanisław August Poniatowski - king, co-organiser of Thursday's dinners, great supporter of arts and sciences in Poland,
- Stanisław Staszic - writer, economist
- Jan Śniadecki - astronomer, mathematician, philosopher
- Jędrzej Śniadecki - chemist
- Stanisław Trembecki - poet (Classicism style)
- Tomasz Kajetan Węgierski - poet, explorer
- Józef Wybicki - political activist, author of the words of Mazurek Dąbrowskiego, Polish national anthem
- Franciszek Zabłocki - poet, comedy writer, secretary of Towarzystwo do Ksiąg Elementarnych
- Andrzej and Józef Załuski - founders of first Polish public library, Biblioteka Załuskich
- Andrzej Zamoyski - kanclerz, politician, author of the Zamoyski Code

== Architecture ==
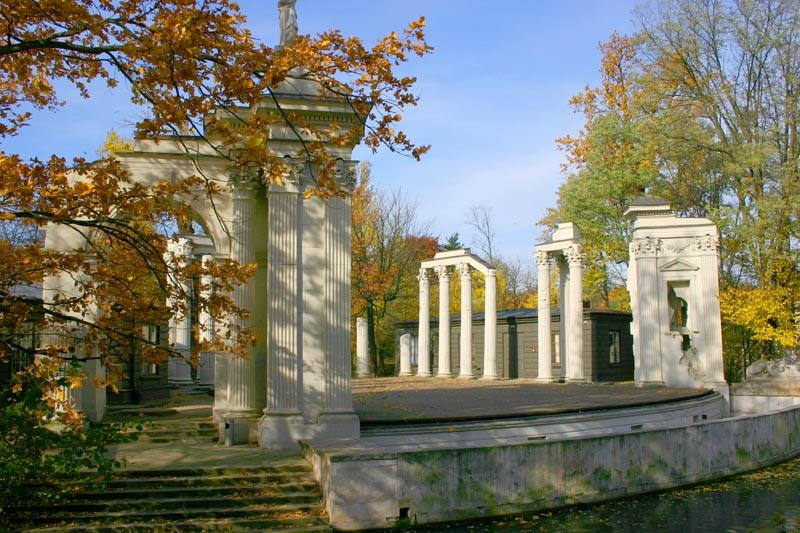
Roman theater on the Isle (1790–1793), a companion to the Palace on the Water.

The center of the neoclassical architecture in Poland was Warsaw under the reign of Stanisław August Poniatowski. Classicism came to Poland in the 18th century. The best known architects and artists, who worked in Poland were Dominik Merlini, Jan Chrystian Kamsetzer, Szymon Bogumił Zug, Stanisław Zawadzki, Efraim Szreger, Antonio Corazzi, Jakub Kubicki, Christian Piotr Aigner, Wawrzyniec Gucewicz and Bertel Thorvaldsen.

The first stage, called the Stanislavian style, followed by an almost complete inhibition and a period known as the Congress Kingdom classicism. The most famous buildings of the Stanislavian period include the Royal Castle in Warsaw, rebuilt by Dominik Merlini and Jan Christian Kamsetzer, Palace on the Water, Królikarnia and the palace in Jabłonna.

From the period of the Congress Kingdom are Koniecpolski Palace and the St. Alexander's Church in Warsaw, the Temple of the Sibyl in Puławy, rebuilding the Łańcut Castle. The leading figure in the Congress Kingdom was Antoni Corrazzi. Corazzi has created a complex of Bank Square in Warsaw, the edifices of the Treasury, Revenue and the Commission of Government, the building of the Staszic Palace, Mostowski Palace and designed the Grand Theatre.

Palaces

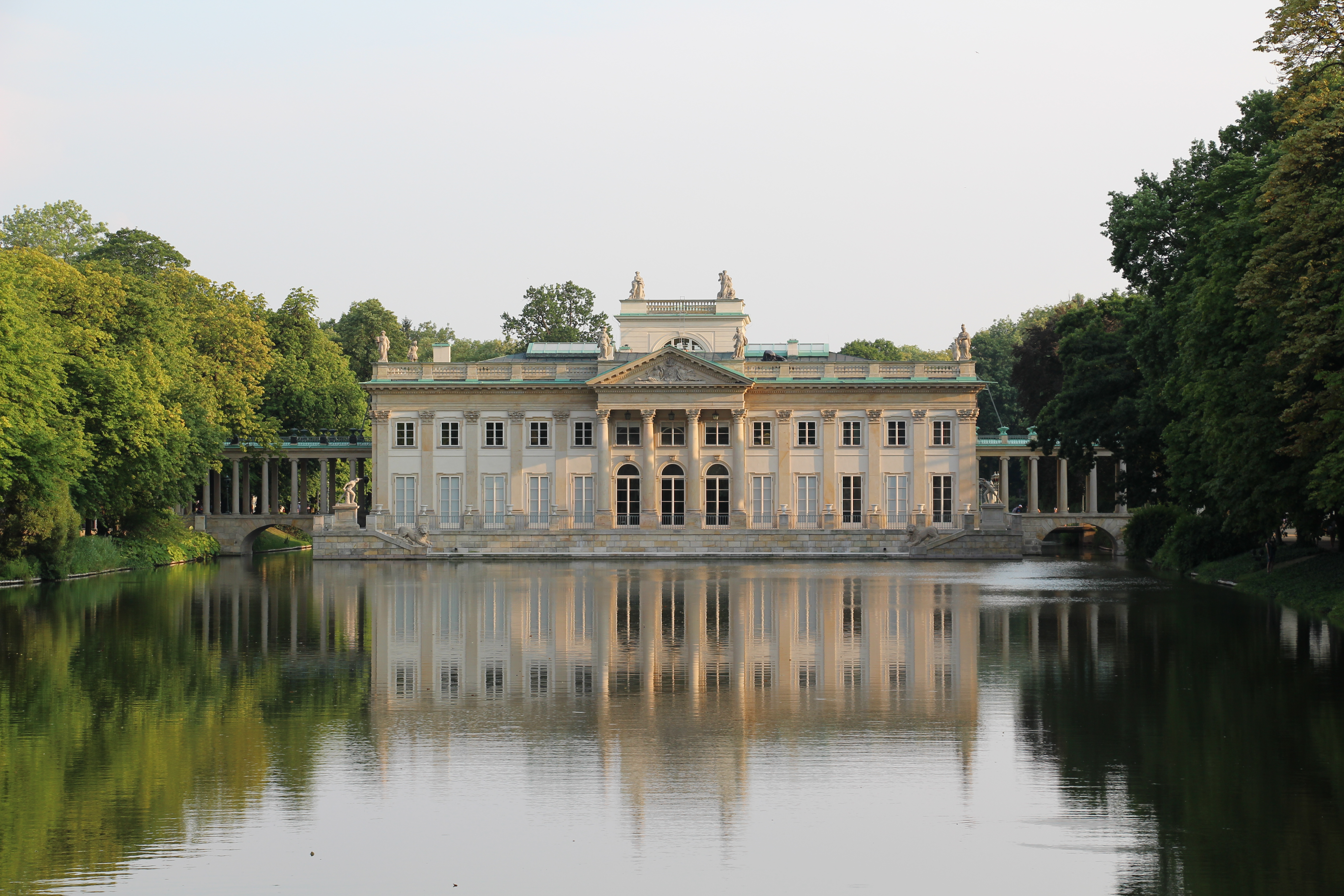
Łazienki Palace, Warsaw, 1764–1795

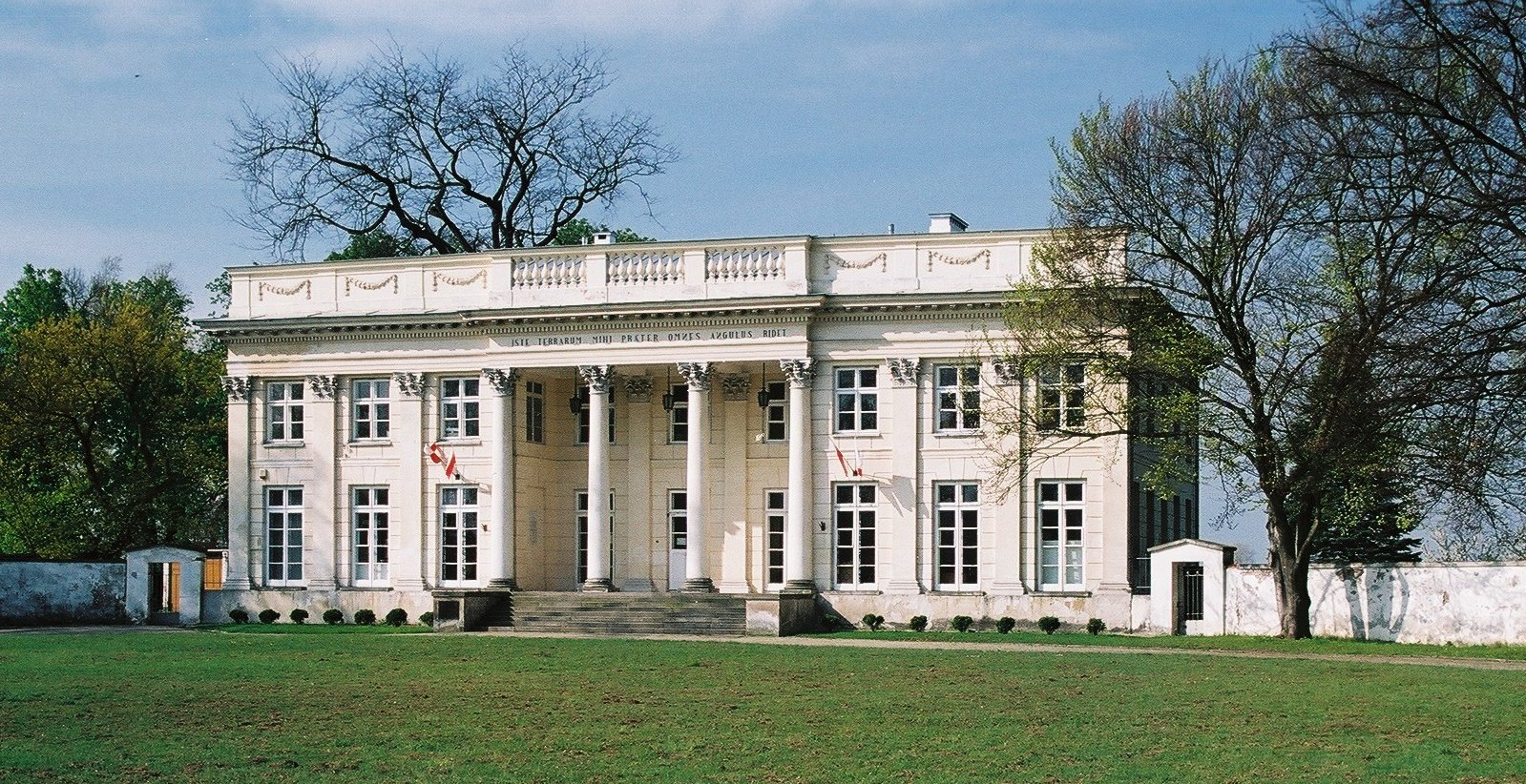
Marynka's Palace, Puławy, 1790–1794

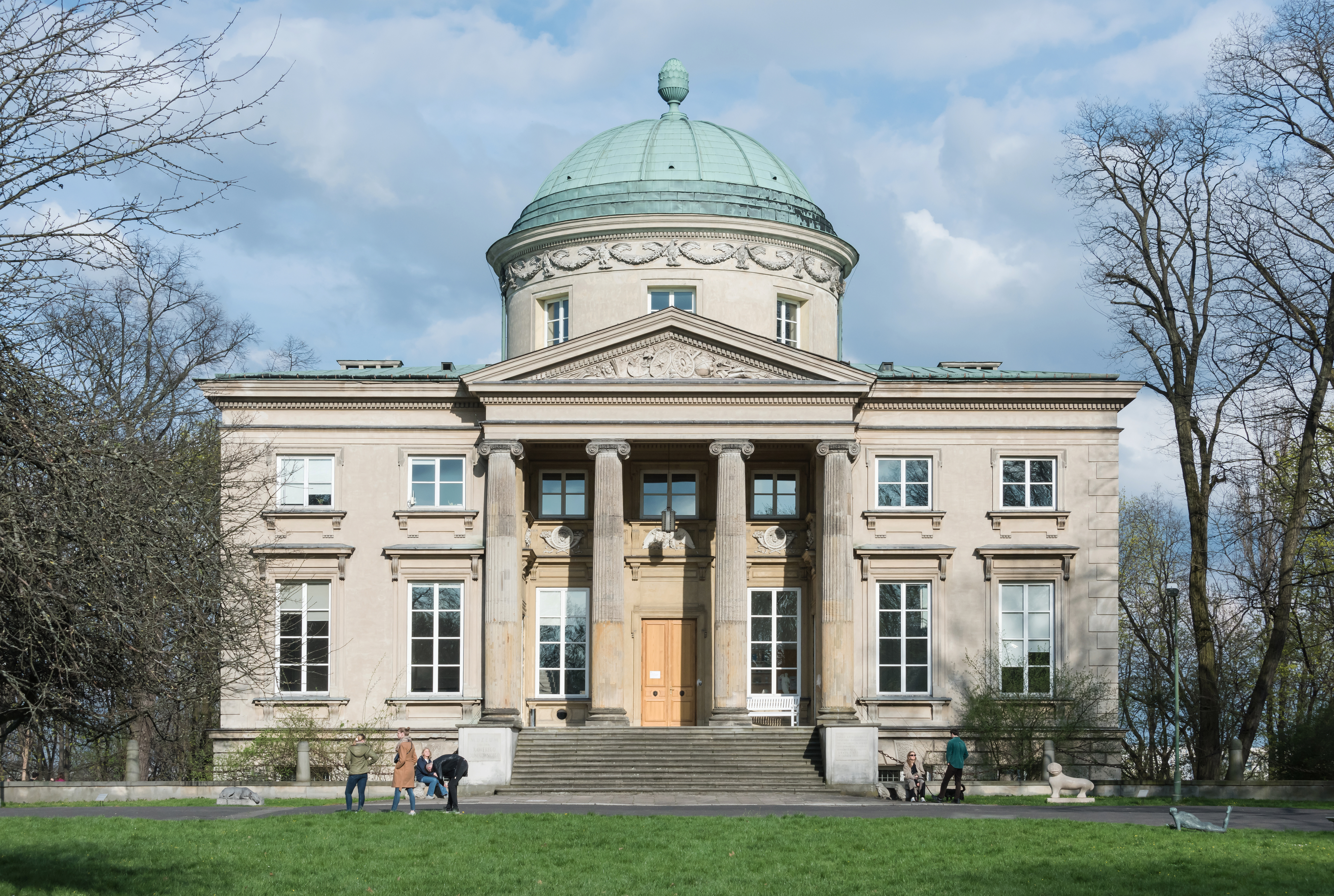
Królikarnia Palace, Warsaw, 1782–1786

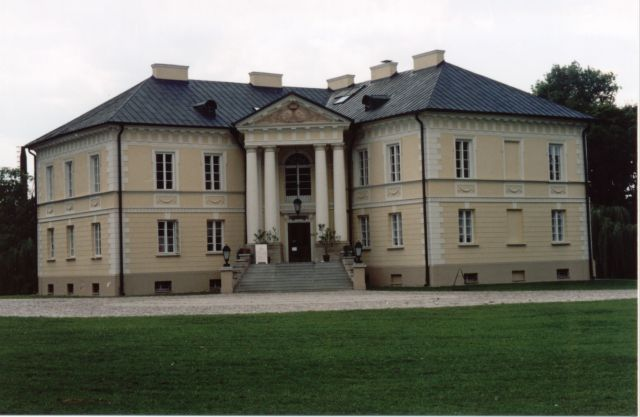
Gorzeński Palace, Dobrzyca, 1795–1799

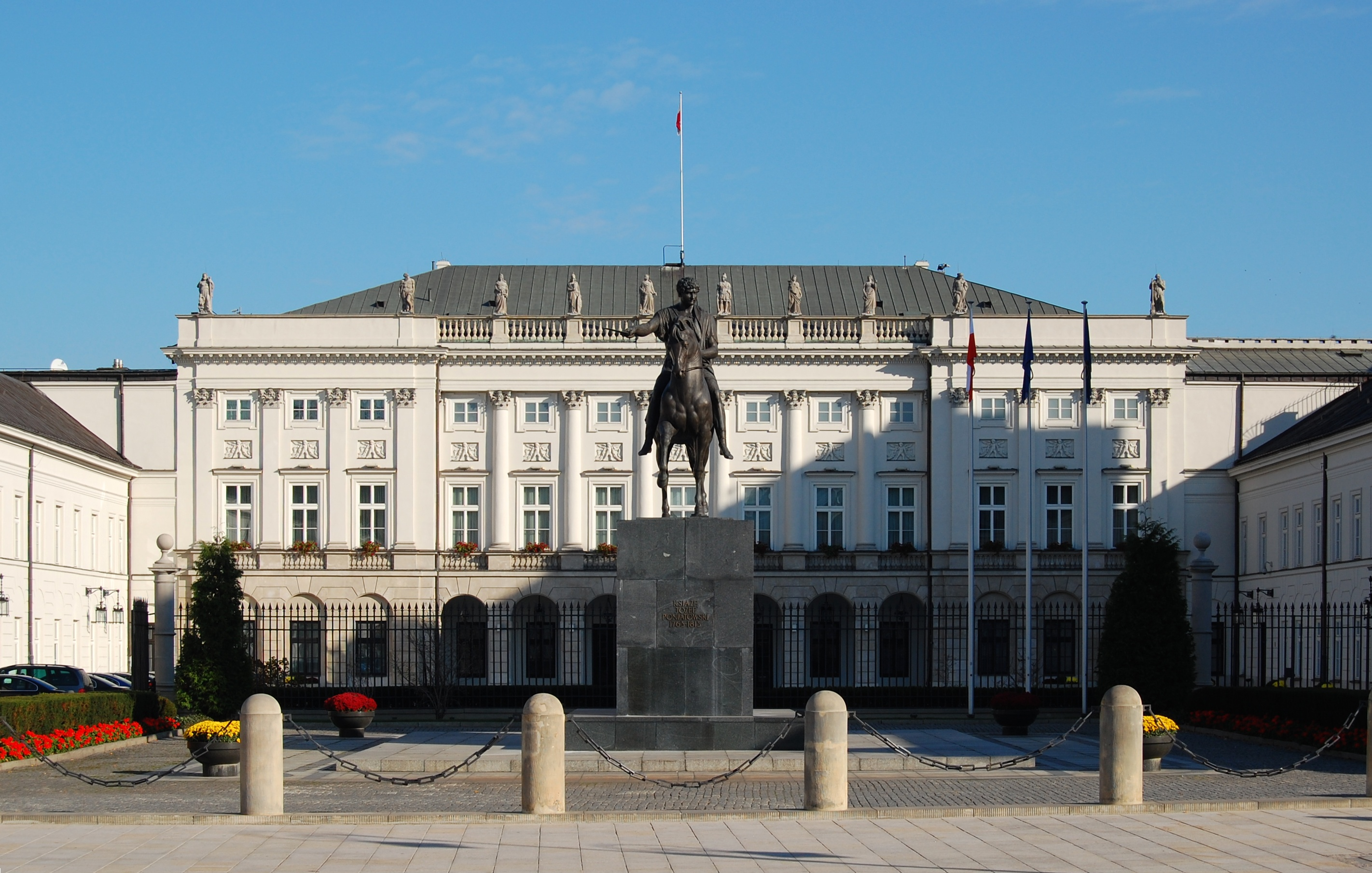
Presidential Palace, Warsaw, 1818

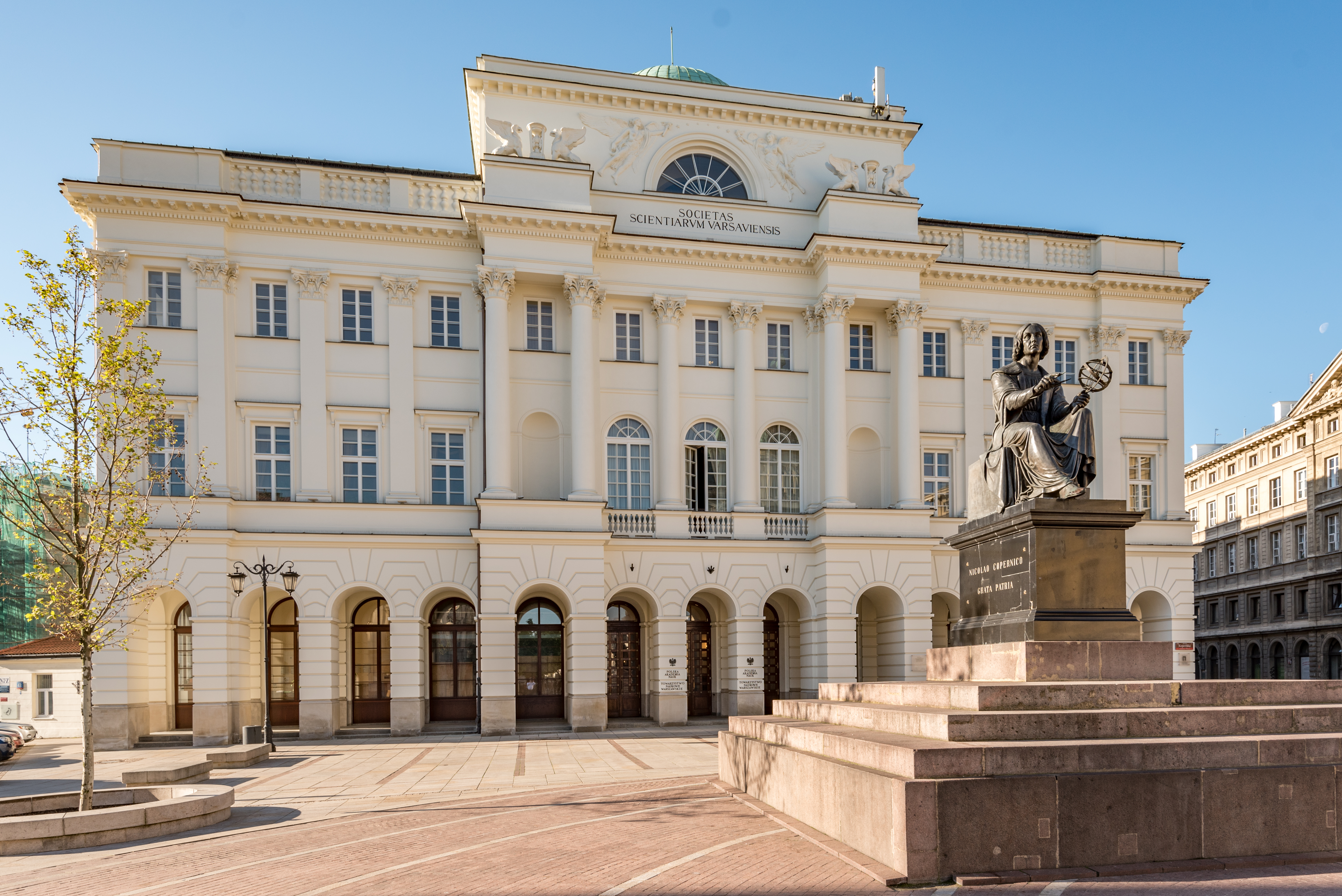
Staszic Palace, Warsaw, 1820–1823

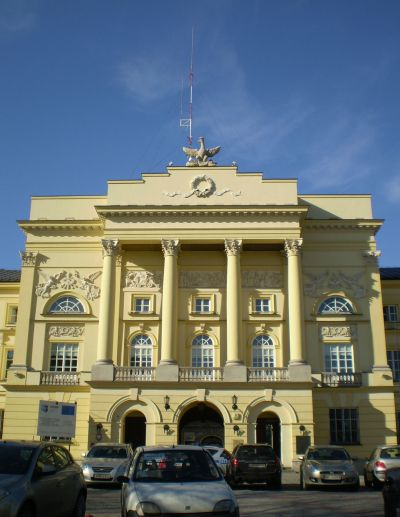
Mostowski Palace, Warsaw, 1823–1824

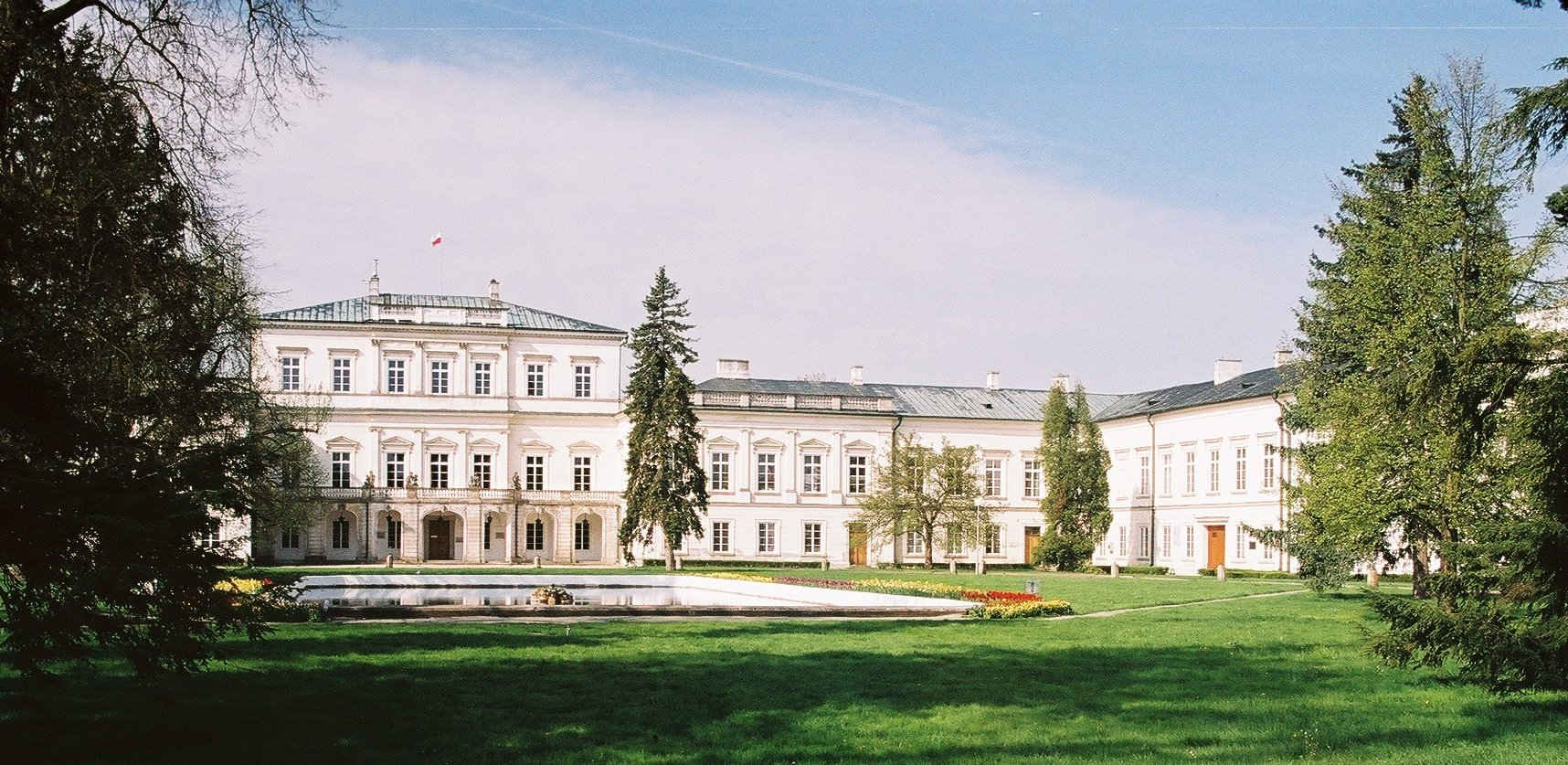
Czartoryski Palace, Puławy, 1840–1843
City structures

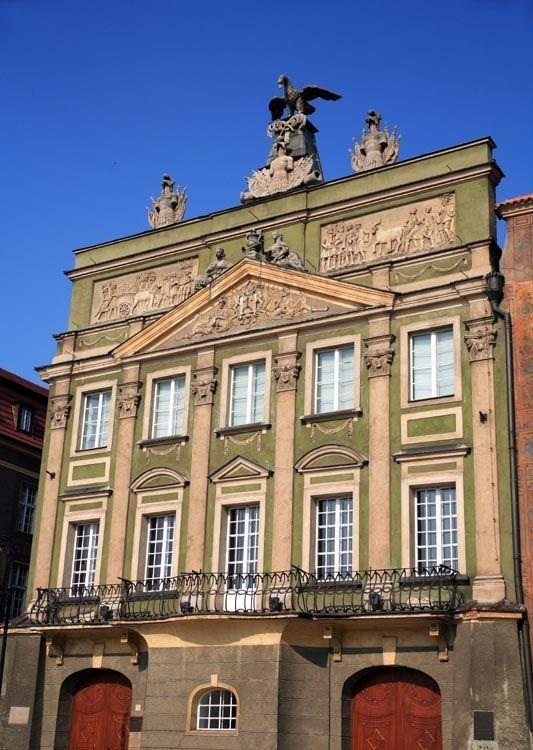
Działyński House, Poznań, 1773–1776

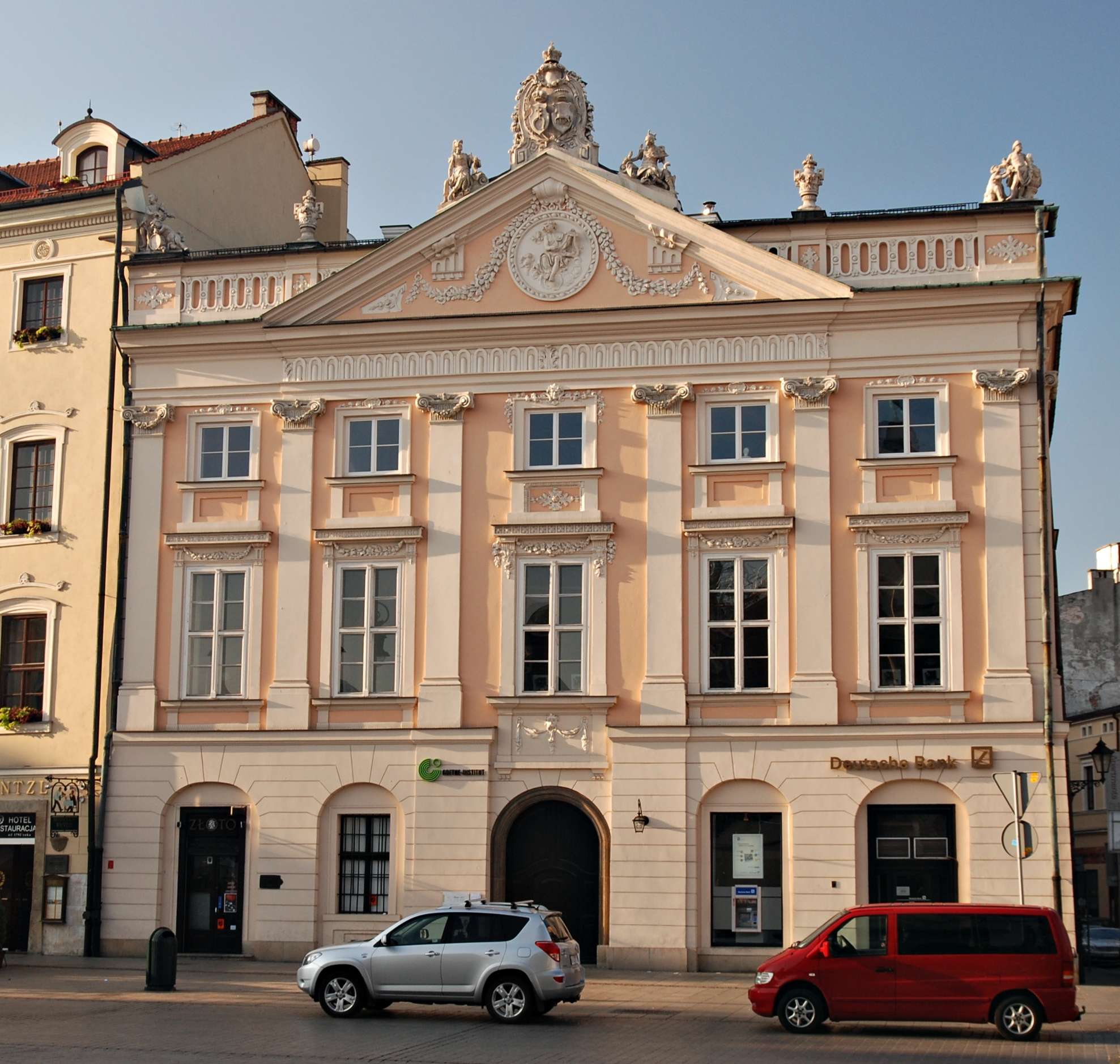
Zbaraski House, Kraków, 1777–1783

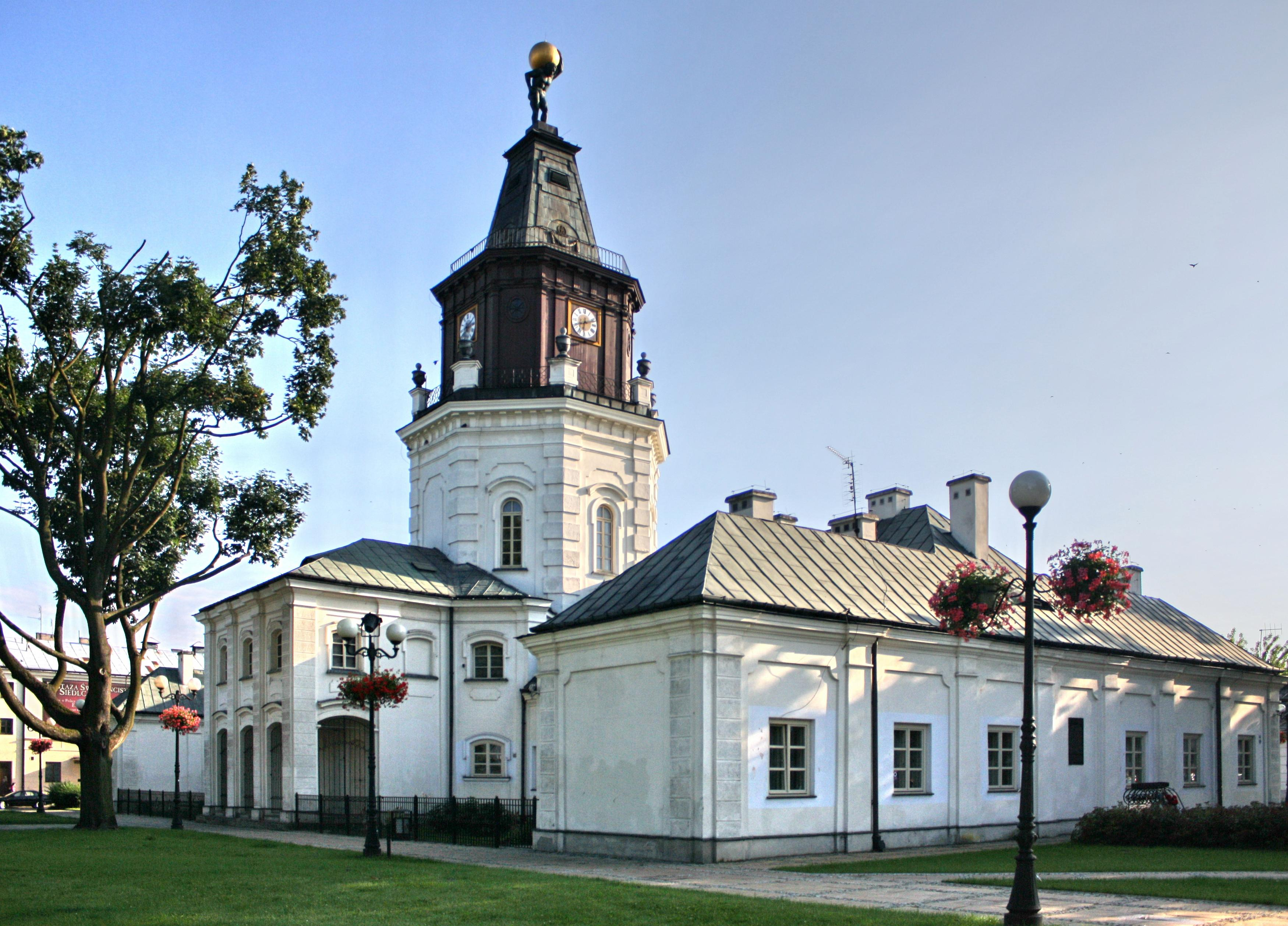
Town Hall, Siedlce, 1766–1769

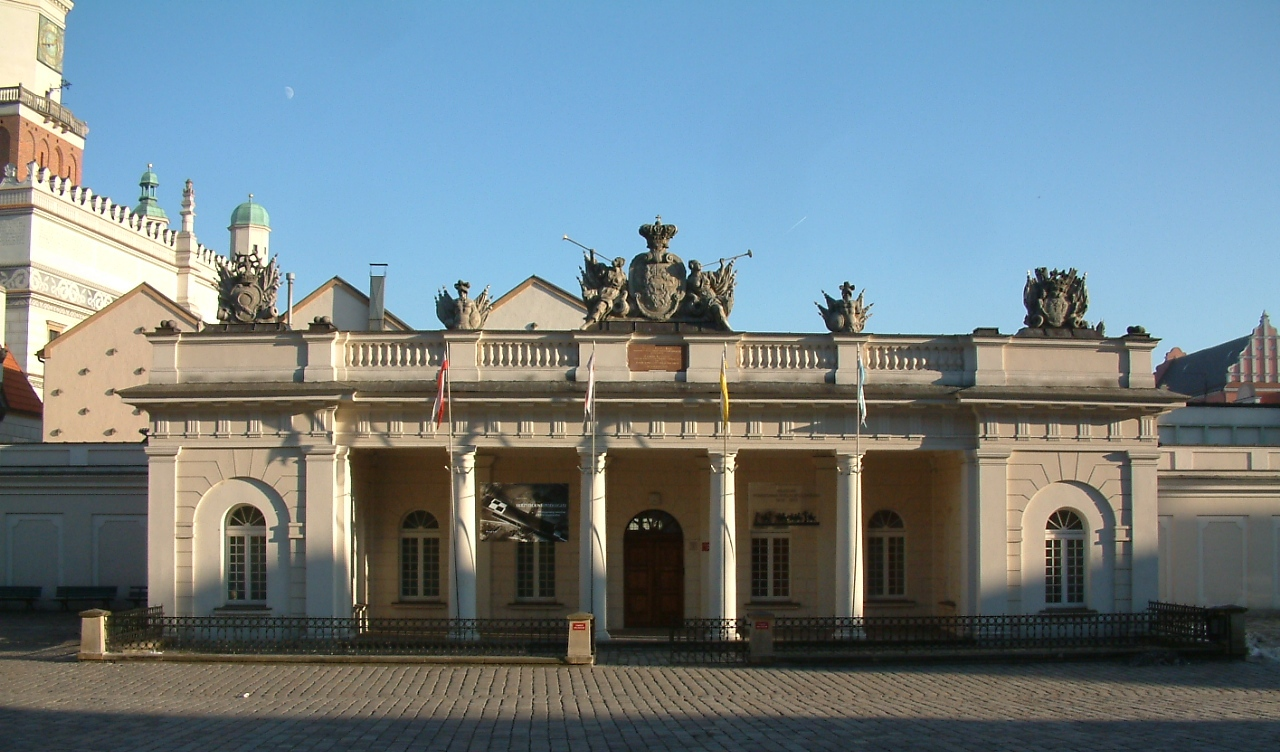
Guardhouse, Poznań, 1783–1787

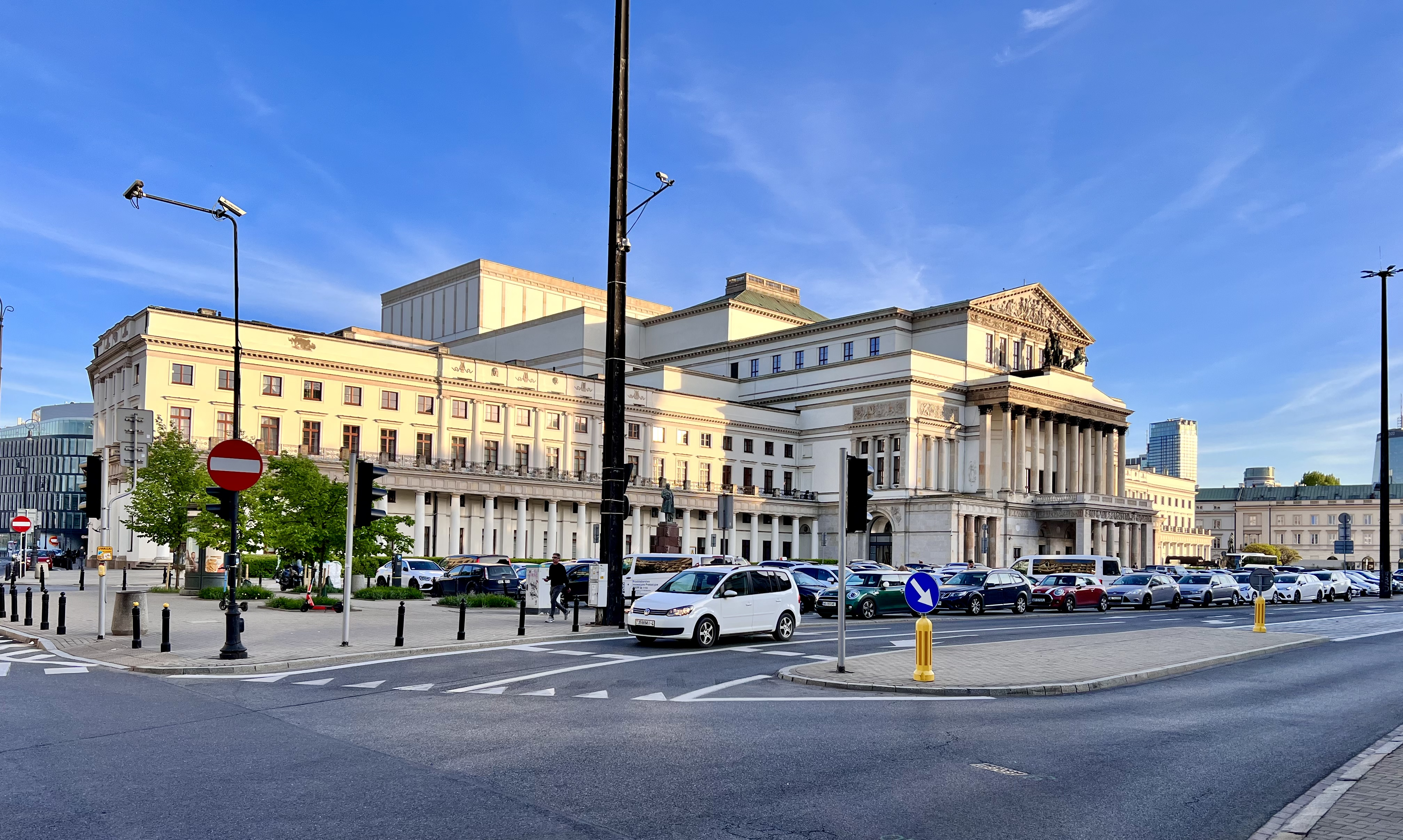
Great Theatre, Warsaw, 1825–1833

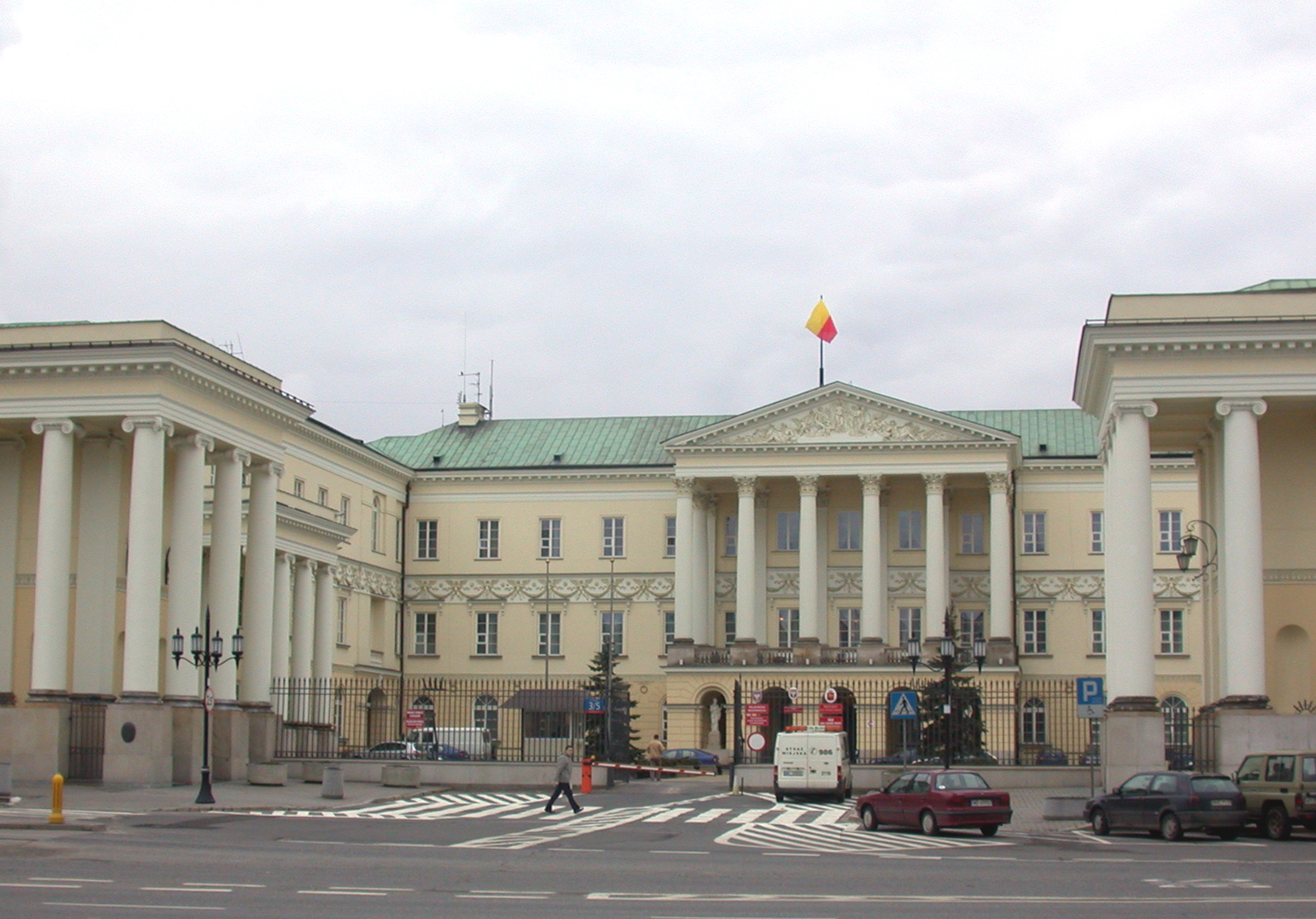
Commission Palace, Warsaw, 1823–1825

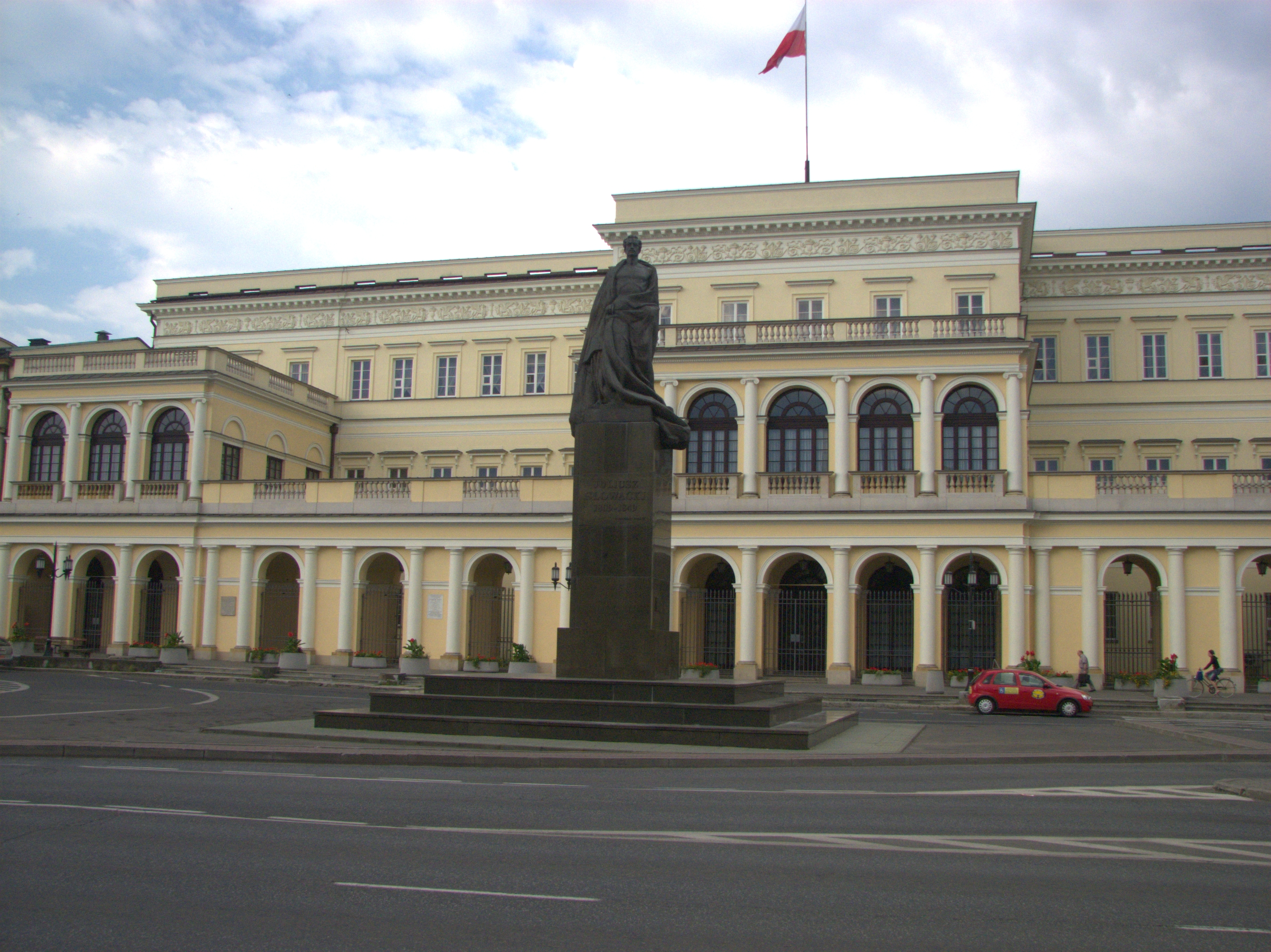
Treasury Ministry, Warsaw, 1825–1828

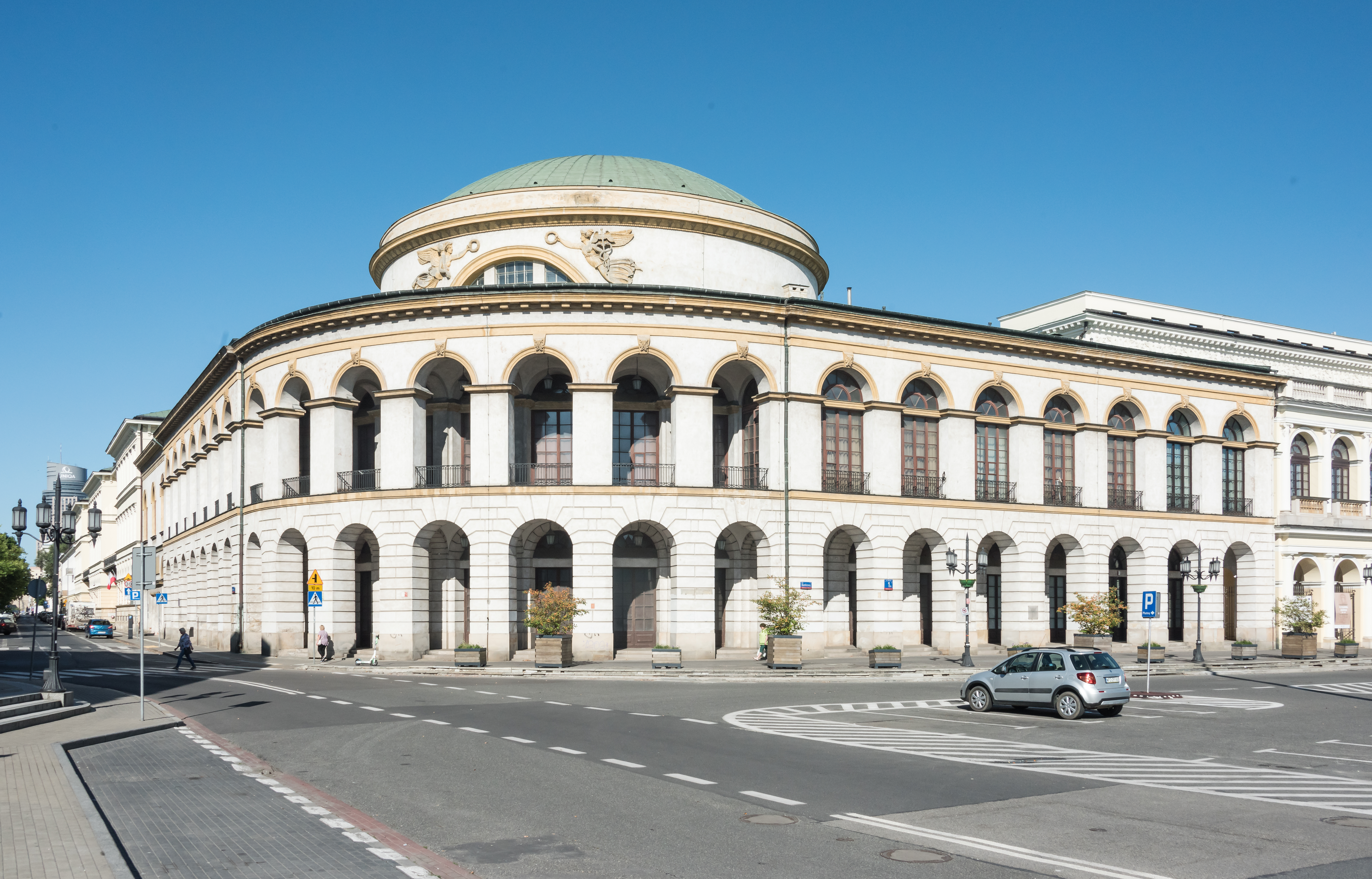
Bank of Poland, Warsaw, 1825–28

== See also ==
- History of philosophy in Poland
