= Feliks Oraczewski =

Polish writer and diplomat (1739–1799)

Feliks Oraczewski of Szreniawa coat of arms (14 January 1739 in Przybysławice – 12 August 1799 in Vienna) was a Polish writer, educational and political activist.

Feliks Oraczewski was a Member of the Polish Parliament from 1773-1775.

He participated in the Commission of National Education. He was also on the Apothecary Permanent Council from 1778-1780. Oraczewski was also a member of the Society for Elementary Books. From 1786-1790 he held the post of rector of the Academy of Kraków.

Orraczewski served as a Polish ambassador in Paris in 1791-1792.

== Writing career ==
Felix Oraczewski also occasionally wrote poems. He also wrote comedies. His works in this genre include The Litigant (1775) and Playground, Or Life Without Purpose(1780).

== Politics ==
In 1773, during a session of the parliament, Oraczewski put forth a proposal for the formation of a parliamentary delegation. His envisioned the mission of this delegation to develop a national education program. This proposal eventually led to the establishment of the National Education Commission.

In 1787, Oraczewski was made a Knight of the Order of Saint Stanislaus.
