= Głos wolny wolność ubezpieczający =

18th Century Polish political treatise

Głos wolny wolność ubezpieczający (variously translated as A Free Voice Ensuring Freedom or The Free Voice Guaranteeing Freedom) is a Polish political treatise. It was written some time between 1733 and 1743, and published in 1743 in Nancy by former king of Poland Stanisław Leszczyński. While Leszczyński himself claimed authorship, some modern scientists believe it was rather ghostwritten by someone of his retinue, possibly Mateusz Białłozor. One of the most important political works of Enlightenment in Poland, it is possible that the French translation of the work, La Voie Libre, influenced Jean Jacques Rousseau.

== Proposed political reforms ==
Heavily influenced by Stanisław Dunin-Karwicki's Egzorbitancje and De ordinanda Republica, the treatise called for deep reform of Poland's political system, economy and a social reform. The author proposed that the royal election laws of the Polish–Lithuanian Commonwealth should be changed to allow only local candidates for the throne ("Piast kings"). The treatise proposes that the landed gentry should abandon its faith in divine providence as the only force able to deliver the fatherland from all dangers.

The author further called for the reclamation of all Crown land to repair the royal treasury, limiting the liberum veto laws, eliminating landless gentry from participating in the Sejm and Sejmiks, and that the szlachta be covered by a 10% income tax as until the late 18th century the gentry was virtually exempted from all taxes.

== Proposed military reforms ==
As to military reforms, the author proposed for the pospolite ruszenie system to be abolished and to be replaced with a standing army of 100,000 men at arms.

== Proposed abolition of serfdom ==
Finally, the treatise was one of the first political pamphlets to propose abolition of serfdom in Poland, granting the serfs with civil rights and replacing serfdom with rent.

== Sources ==
- (in English) Anna Grześkowiak-Krwawicz (2012). Queen Liberty: The Concept of Freedom in the Polish-Lithuanian Commonwealth. BRILL. p. 144. ISBN 978-90-04-23122-1.
- (in English) Jerzy Łukowski (2010). Disorderly Liberty: The Political Culture of the Polish-Lithuanian Commonwealth in the Eighteenth Century. A&C Black. p. 368. ISBN 978-1-4411-4580-2.
