= Michał Jan Hube =

Polish physicist and educator

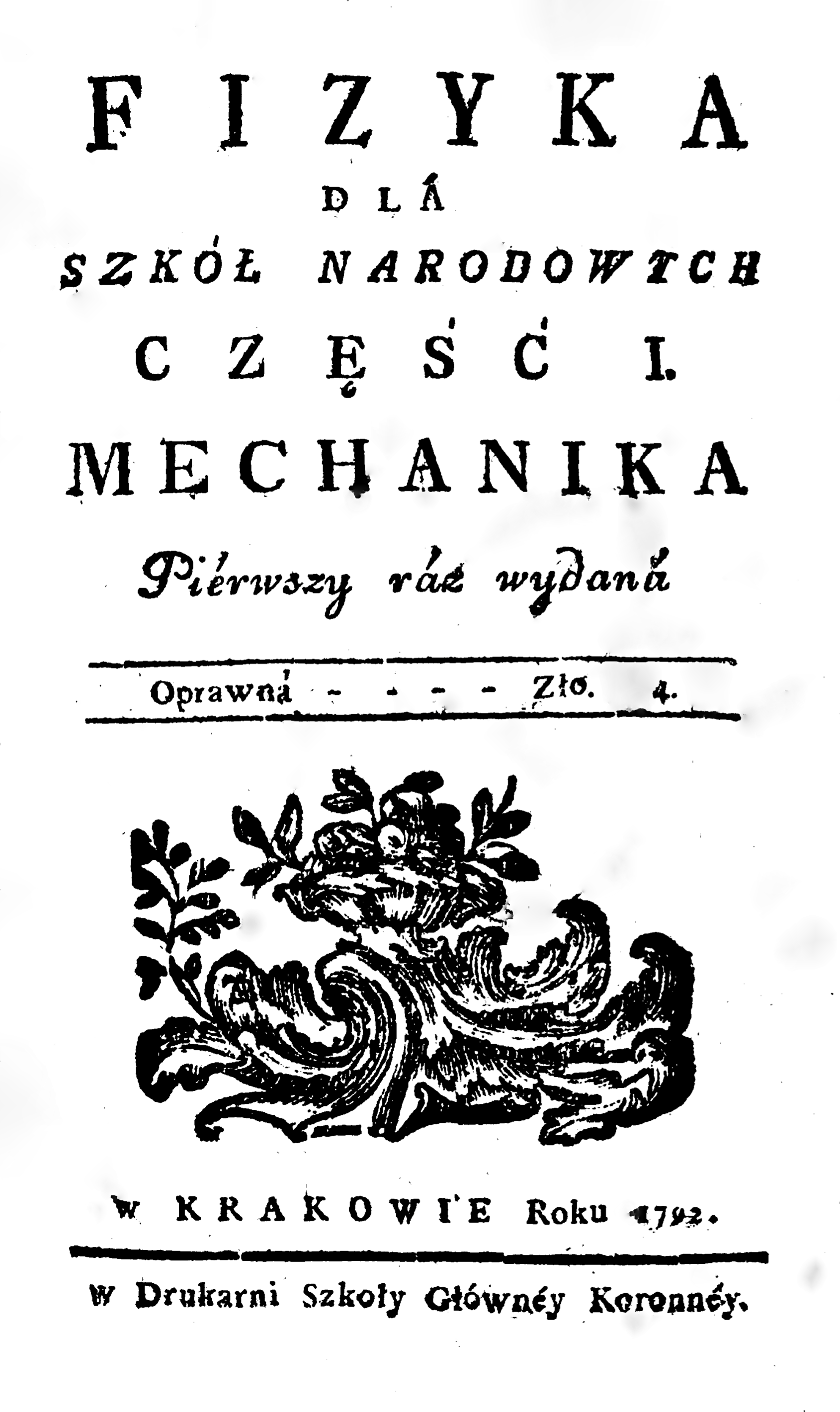
One of Hube's works

Michał Jan Hube (1737–1807) was a Polish physicist and educator who authored books for the National Education Commission. He was born in Toruń and held early jobs in that city, Warsaw, and with King Stanisław Augustus. God's Playground mentions him as the headmaster of the Collegium Nobilium, and historian Lesław Łukaszewicz lists him as the director of the Corps of Cadets. Some of his scientific work was also performed in meteorology.

== Works ==
- (1783) Wstęp do fizyki dla szkół narodowych
- (1791) Listy fizyczne, czyli nauka przyrodzenia
- (1792) Fizyka dla szkół narodowych

== See also ==
- Society for Elementary Books
