= Commission of National Education =

Central education authority of the Polish-Lithuanian Commonwealth

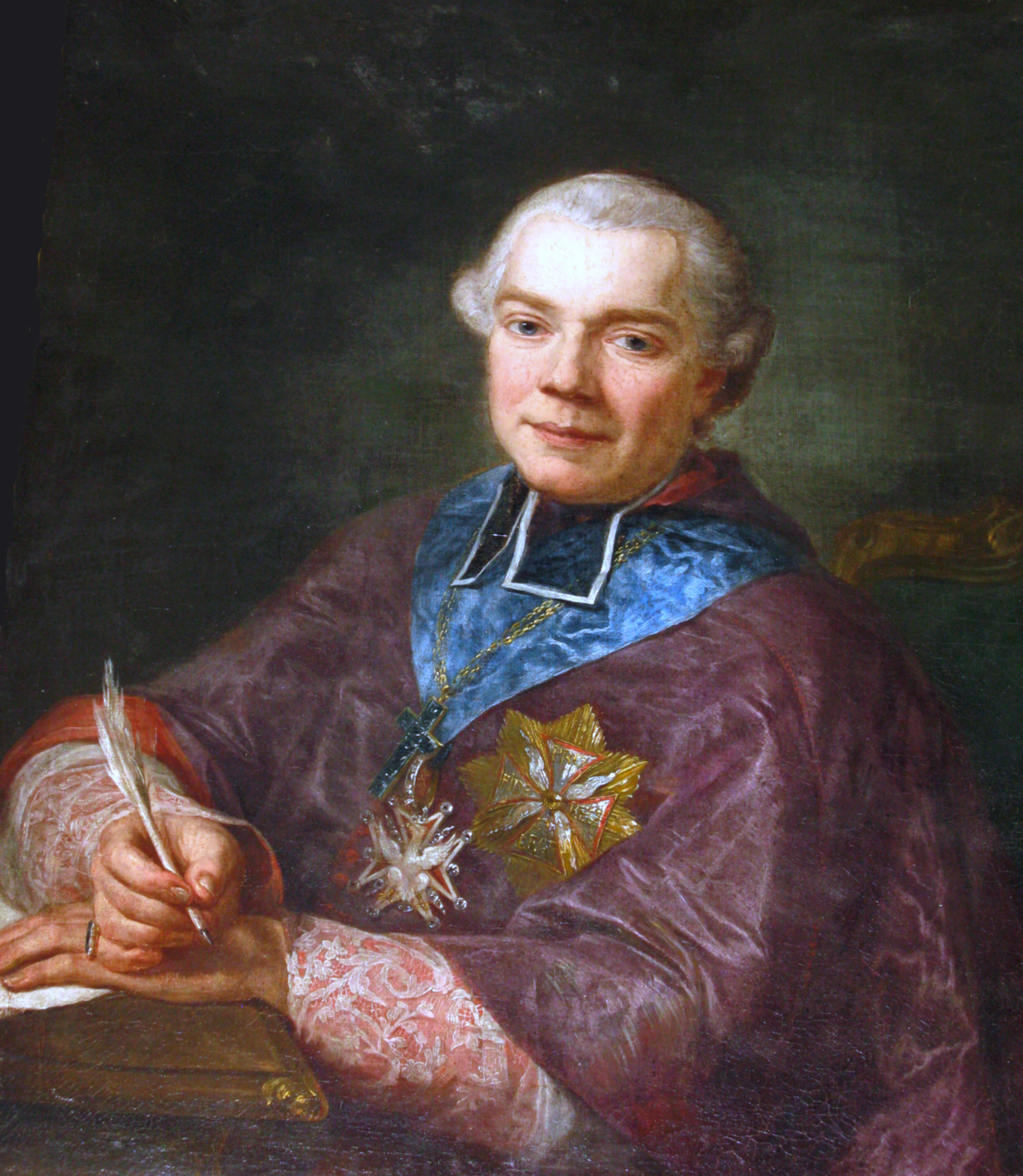
Ignacy Massalski, Bishop of Vilnius and the first chairman, was removed from this post in 1776 because of alleged financial misdemeanour; he subsequently became a leading member of the Targowica Confederation

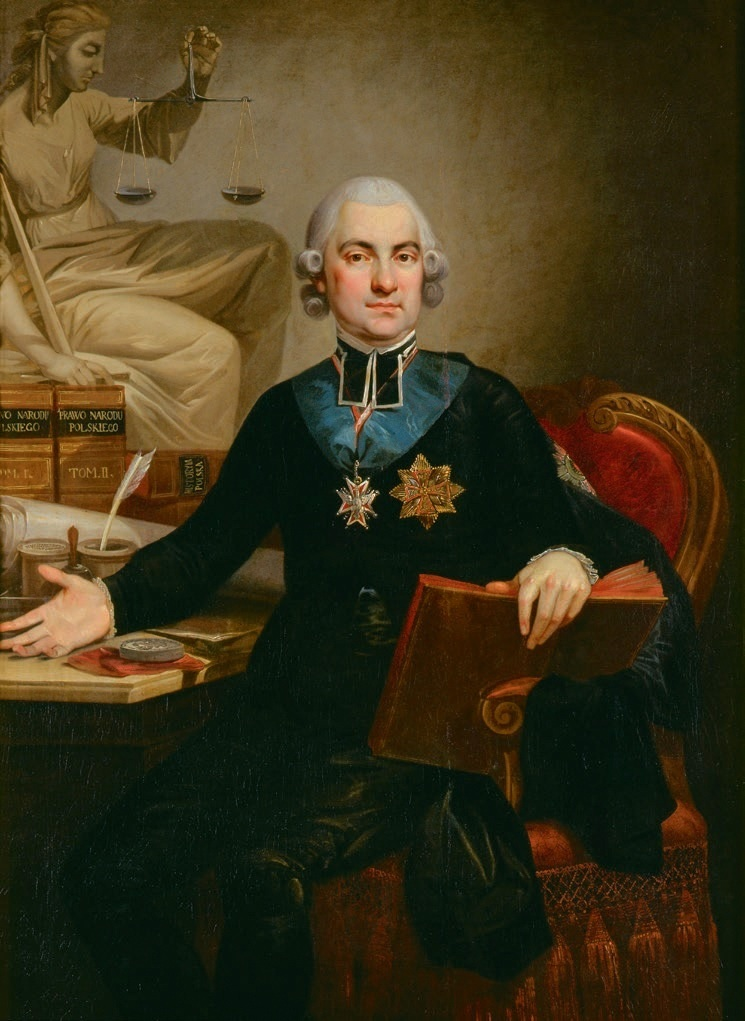
Hugo Kołłątaj reformed Cracow Academy during 1777–1780

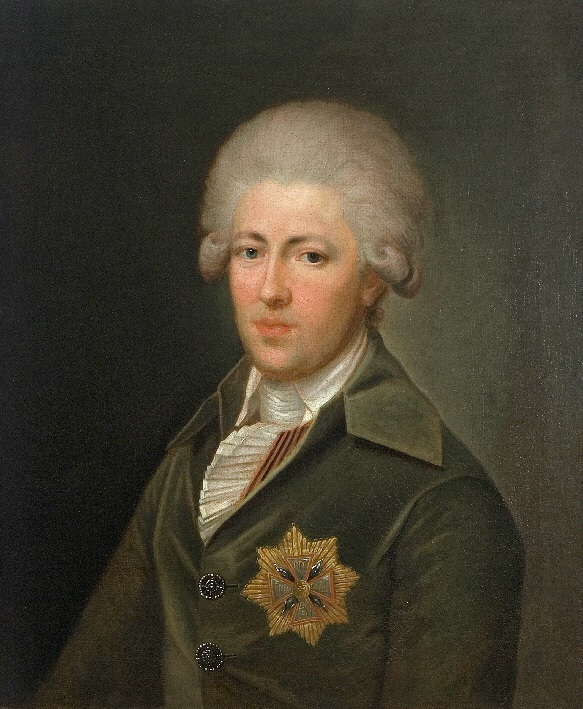
Ignacy Potocki – chairman of the Society for Elementary Books

The Commission of National Education (Polish: Komisja Edukacji Narodowej, KEN, Lithuanian: Edukacinė komisija) was the central educational authority in the Polish–Lithuanian Commonwealth, created by the Sejm and King Stanisław II August on October 14, 1773. Because of its vast authority and autonomy, it is considered the first education ministry in European history and an important achievement of the Polish Enlightenment.

== History ==
=== Genesis ===
The chief reason behind its creation was that in Poland and Lithuania, the Jesuits ran an extensive system of educational institutions. Although the Jesuit schools were fairly efficient and provided the Polish youth with a good education, they were also very conservative. In addition, in 1773 the Pope decided to close down the Jesuit order (Dominus ac Redemptor). This threatened a complete breakdown of education in the Commonwealth.

One of the first items on the parliamentary agenda of the Partition Sejm (1773–1775), which acceded to the First Partition of Poland, was the assessment in how to best use the former Jesuit property and declaration of a firm intention to the continuity of the education system.

The commission was formally created on October 14, 1773. It was one of the newly set-up "Grand Commissions"; organisations with the status of a ministry, albeit with a collegiate structure. Its main mastermind and chief figure was a Catholic priest, Hugo Kołłątaj; other notable supporters included Ignacy Potocki and Adam K. Czartoryski. Initially, the governing body consisted of four senators and four members of the Sejm, half of them representing the eastern "counties" voivodships of the Commonwealth (from the Grand Duchy of Lithuania). The first head of the KEN was Prince Bishop Michał Jerzy Poniatowski. Although the other members were mostly magnate politicians, the main founders of the body were the prominent writers and scientists of the epoch: Franciszek Bieliński, Julian Ursyn Niemcewicz, Feliks Oraczewski, Andrzej Gawroński, Dawid Pilchowski, Hieronim Stroynowski and Grzegorz Piramowicz. They were joined by Pierre Samuel du Pont de Nemours, the secretary of the king of Poland (and father of the founder of the DuPont company).

Despite the fact that, initially, the KEN had to face a strong opposition in the Sejm, it was supported by both the monarch and the Familia party, which accorded it almost complete independence in management of its affairs.

=== Early (formative) period (1773–1780) ===
In 1773 the KEN was granted much of the former property of the Jesuit order, including all the schools, and many palaces and Church-owned villages. Due to this fact, the commission had not only benefited from the necessary infrastructure, but also had its own profit-yielding farms.

The commission supervised two universities (Jagiellonian University in Kraków and Vilnius University in Vilnius), 74 secondary schools and about 1600 parish schools. The third university in the Commonwealth, Lwów University, had been lost to the Austrian Partition.

Soon afterwards Hugo Kołłątaj prepared a three-level-based education plan:

1. Parochial schools – for peasants and burghers;
2. Powiat schools – mostly for children of the szlachta (nobility); however, children of lower classes were also admitted;
3. Universities – Academy of Warsaw, Academy of Vilnius and Academy of Kraków

Since all prior education in the Polish–Lithuanian Commonwealth was conducted mostly in Latin, the KEN faced the problem of an almost complete lack of books and manuals. To cope with the problem the Society of Elementary Books (Towarzystwo Ksiąg Elementarnych) was, therefore, established. The society sponsored competitions for creating the best textbooks. The scientists—working on the new Polish language textbooks—had, at times, to come up with the necessary vocabulary entries. Much of the vocabulary they invented (in relation to chemistry, physics, mathematics or grammar) is still in use up to this day.

The commission also devised several documents, outlining the whole educational process. However, several of the new principles were considered too novel for that age, and were often ignored. These included, inter alia, the principle of 'equality of both sexes' in education. In 1780, the Opposition refused to sign the Statute on Elementary Schools (which was drafted by Kołłątaj).

In 1774 the commission took over the Załuski Library.

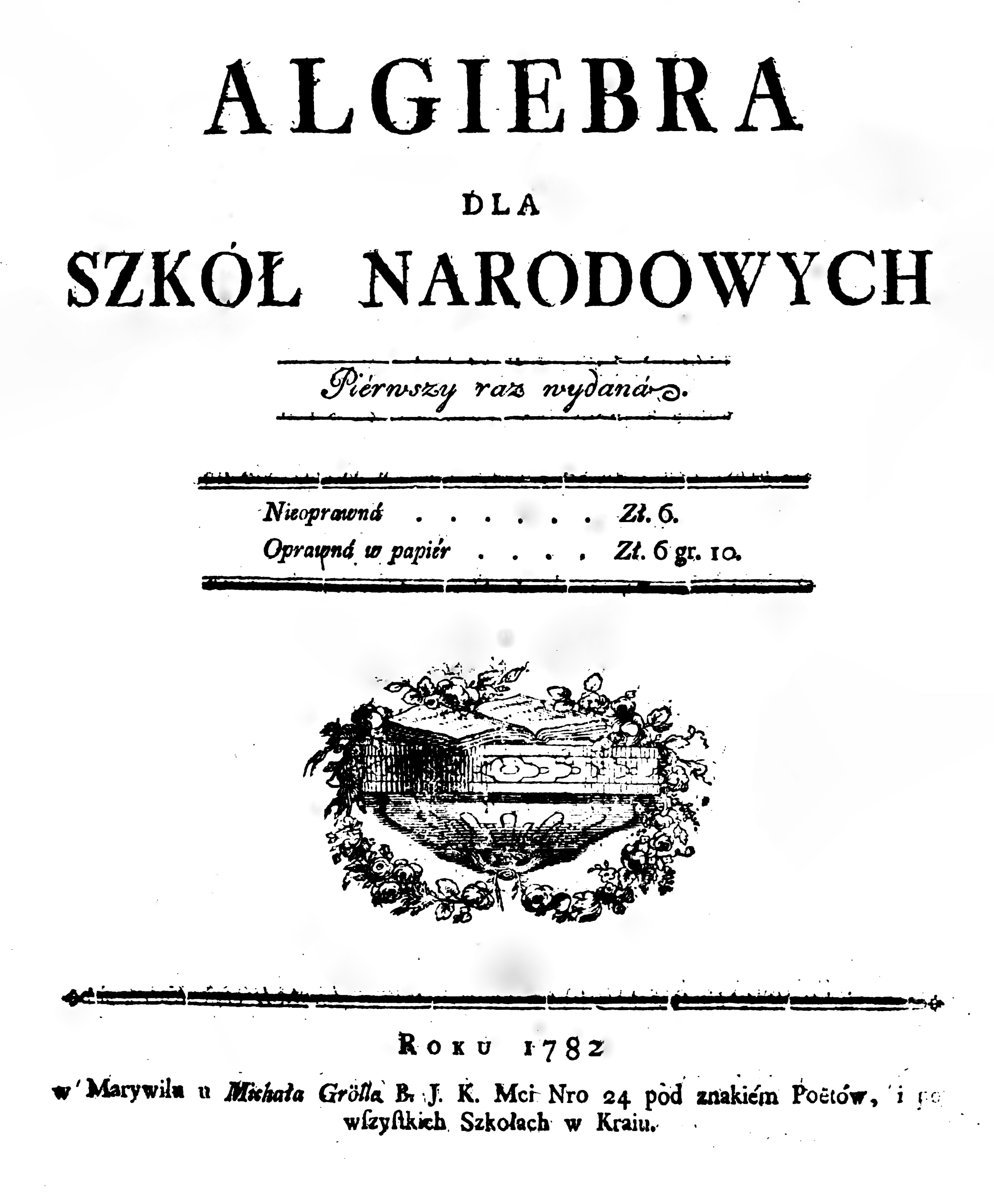
Algebra for national schools, (1782).

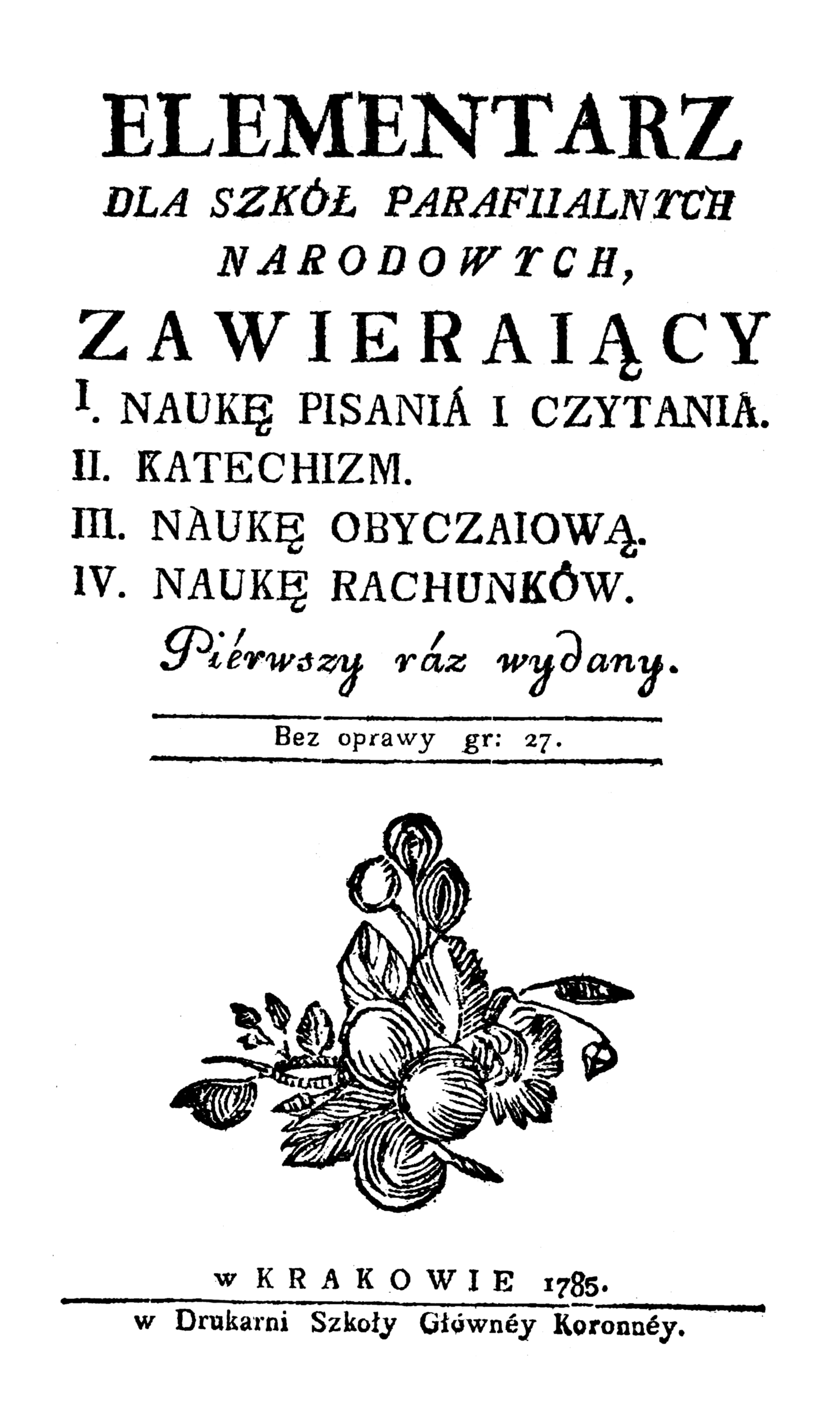
Elementary book, (1785).

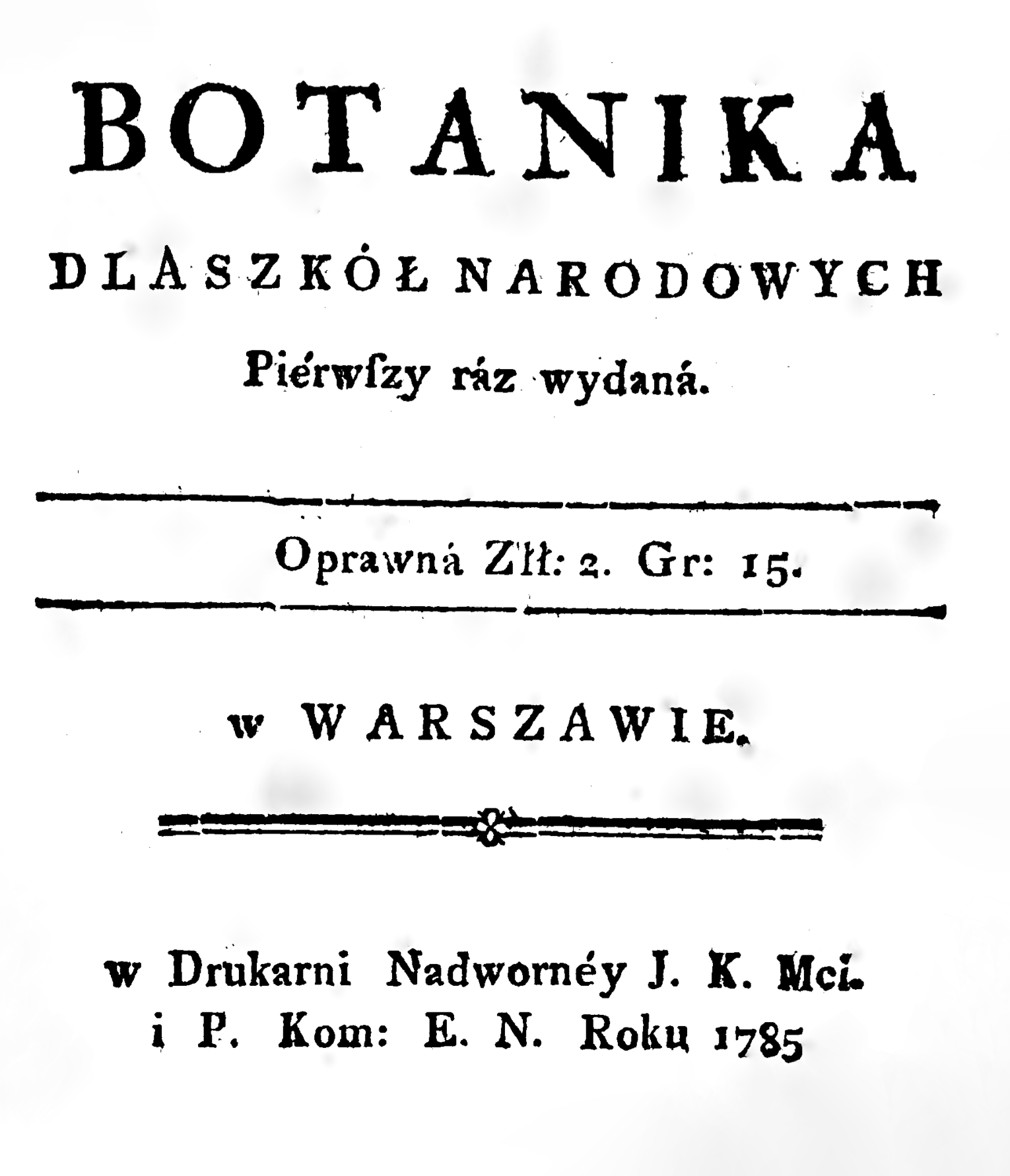
Krzysztof Kluk, Botanics for national schools, (1785).

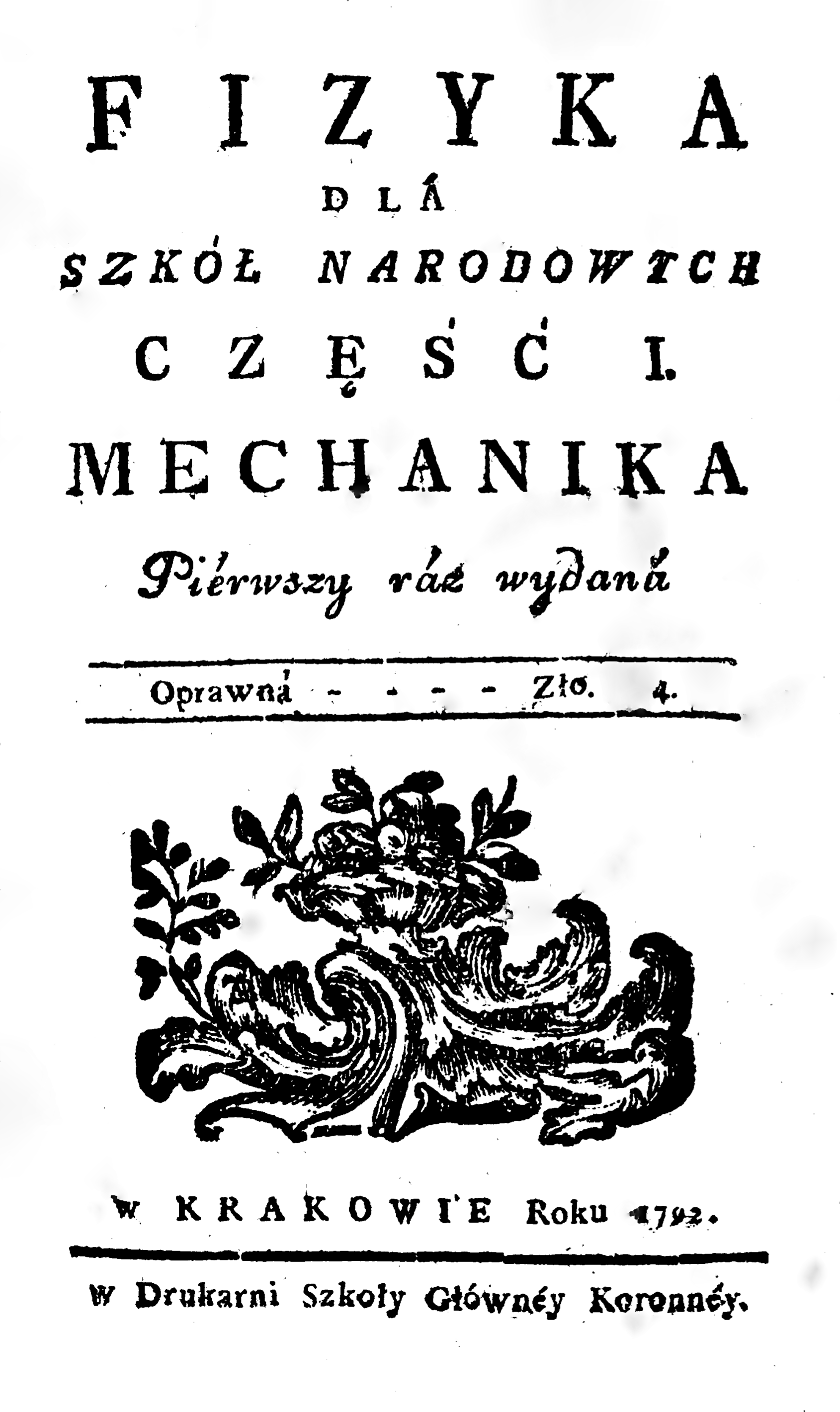
Michał Jan Hube, Physics for national schools (1792).

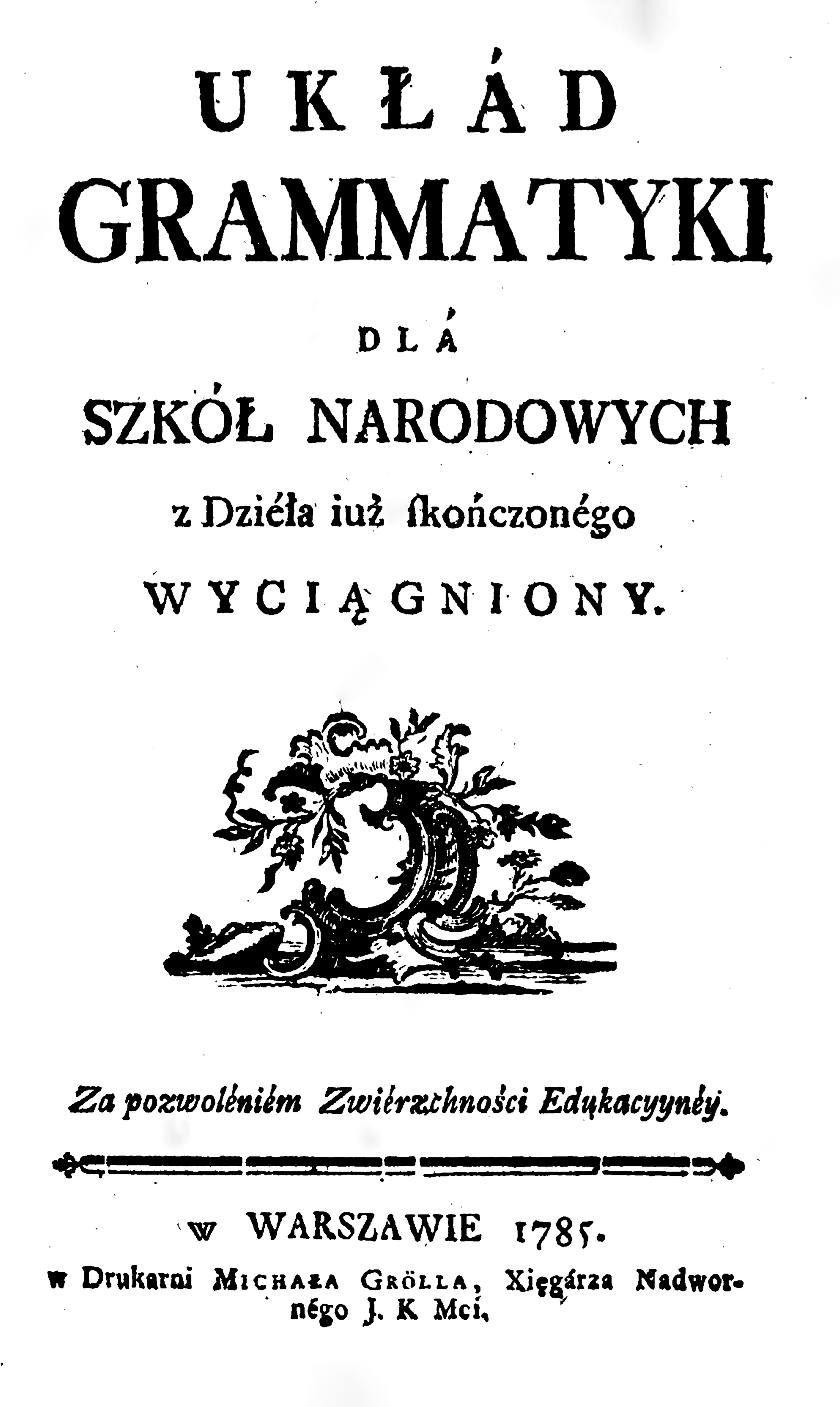
Onufry Kopczyński, The layout of Grammatics for national schools, (1785).

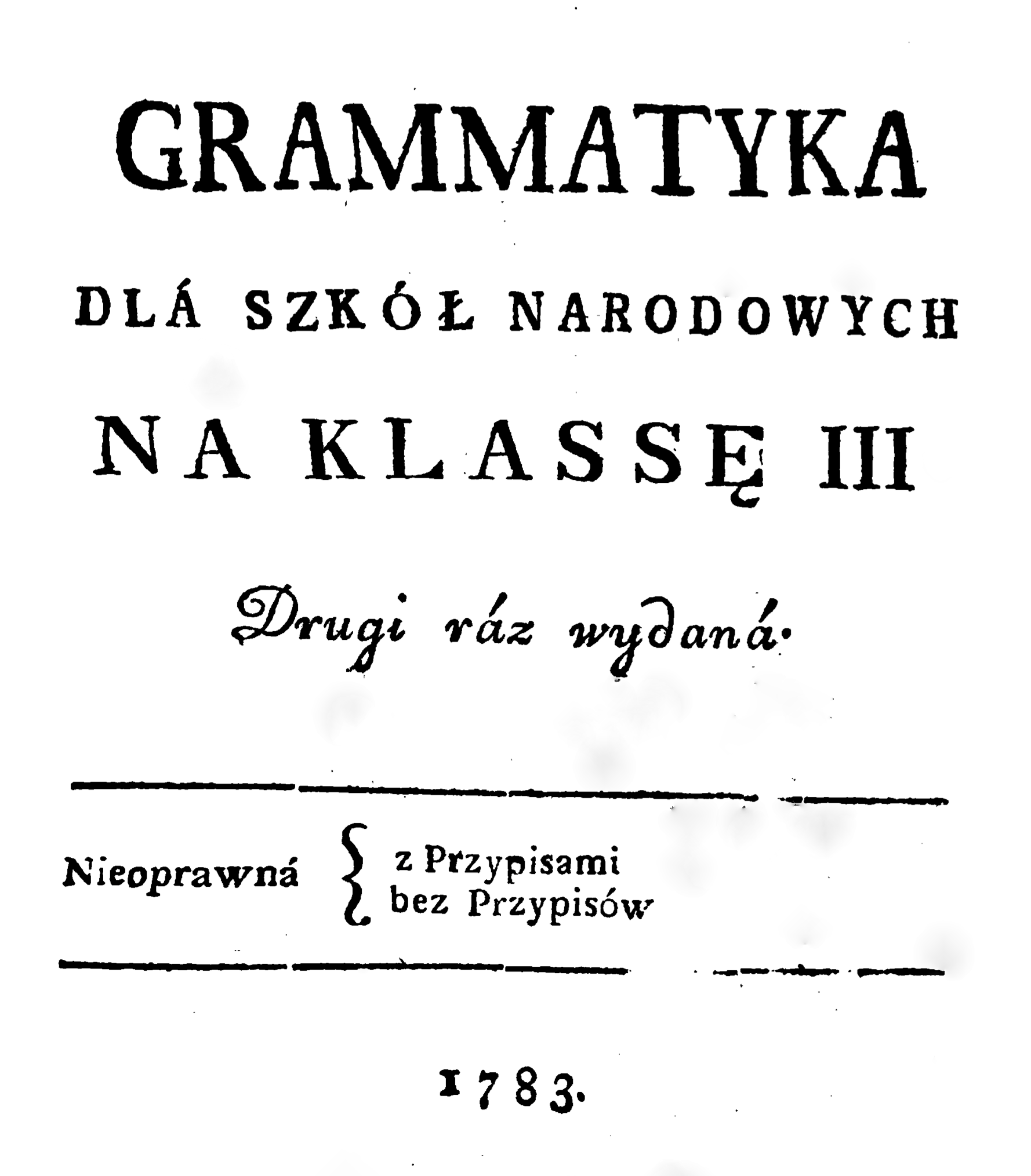
Grammatics for national schools, (1783).

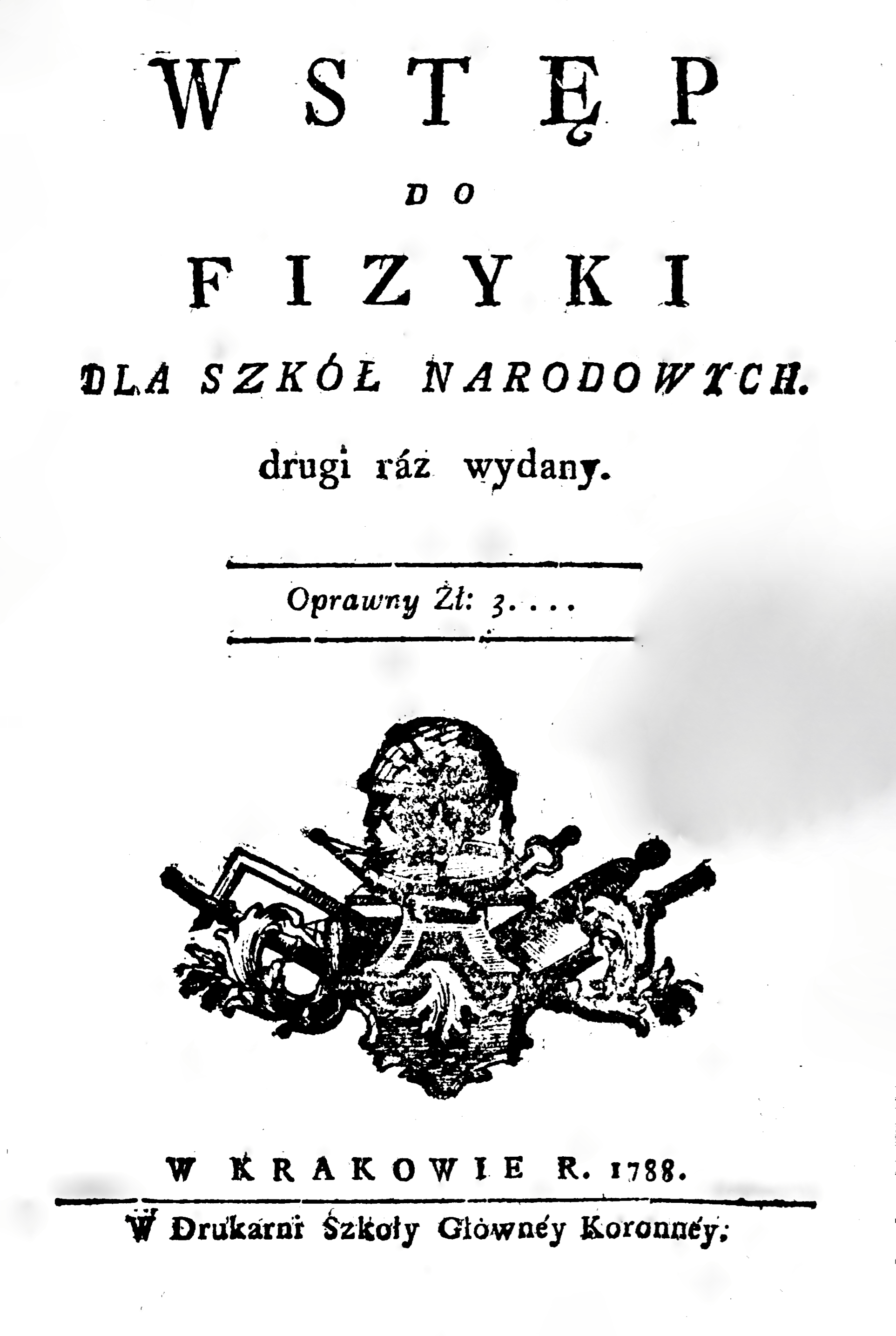
Introduction to physics for national schools, (1788).

=== Second phase (1781–1788) ===
After the formative period, during which the prerogatives of the commission were established, the KEN started to convert schools to the new model. The three universities in Warsaw, Vilnius and Kraków were granted the right of curatorship over schools of lower degree. This included the schools which remained under the influence of the Roman Church. Gradually, the teachers, who were frequently former Jesuit priests, were exchanged for young lay teachers - graduates of the three academies. Thanks to this move, the opposition inside the local schools was finally broken.

=== Third phase (1788–1794) ===
After 1789 the supporters of reforms in the Polish Sejm gradually started to lose their influence. Similarly, the KEN was deprived of many of its former privileges. During the Sejm Wielki the Reformers had to sacrifice many of those privileges to gain support for the strongly reformist Constitution of May the 3rd which aimed to strengthen the country against further partition in 1791. Ultimately, after the victory of the Confederation of Targowica, in 1794, the KEN lost control over most of the schools in the Commonwealth and many of its members were banished or had to defect abroad. This included Hugo Kołłątaj himself, who had to escape to Dresden. The process of dissolving the Commonwealth was completed in 1795, with its territory being ceded to Russia, Prussia and Austria.

== Legacy ==
Although the commission had only functioned for around 20 years, it managed to completely change the shape of education in Poland. The Enlightenment-based school programmes and books influenced the whole generation of Poles. Also, although education was still far from being universal, it became accessible to a much wider group of people, including peasants. Thousands of teachers—trained in lay teachers' seminaries—became the backbone of Polish science during the Partitions and the generation, educated in the schools created and supervised by the KEN, gave rise to the most prominent personalities of the Polish uprisings and of politics in Central Europe in the 19th century. In addition, the 27 elementary textbooks and manuals, published by the commission, laid the foundations for the Polish language terminology in chemistry, physics, logics, grammar and mathematics. They were used by all prominent Polish scientists and authors of the 19th century, from Adam Mickiewicz to Bolesław Prus and from the Lwów School of Mathematics to the Lwów–Warsaw School of History. The Guidebook to Chemistry, by Jędrzej Śniadecki, remained in use in the Polish schools well beyond the 1930s.

It is often argued, with quite some force, that because of the efforts of the Commission of National Education, the Polish language and culture did not disappear into oblivion, during the Partitions of Poland – heavy Russification and Germanisation notwithstanding.

== Members ==
Members of Commission of National Education were:

Member	Other posts	Time of membership	Notes
Ignacy Massalski	Bishop of Vilnius	1773–1792	President until 1786
Michał Poniatowski	Bishop of Plock, Primate of Poland (from 1784)	1773–1792	President from 1786
August Sułkowski	Voivode of Gniezno, Voivode of Kalis, Voivode of Poznań	1773–1786	
Joachim Chreptowicz	Deputy Chancellor of Lithuania, PLC minister of foreign affairs (from 1791)	1773–1786	
Ignacy Potocki	Grand Clerk of Lithuania, Grand Marshal of Lithuania, PLC minister of police (from 1791)	1773–1791	
Adam Kazimierz Czartoryski	General Starosta of Podolia, Commander of Cadet Corps	1773–1792	
Andrzej Zamoyski	former Great Chancellor of the Crown	1773–1783	
Antoni Poniński	Starosta of Kopanica	1773–1777	
Andrzej Mokronowski	general inspector, Voivode of Mazovia (from 1781)	1776–1784	
Jacek Małachowski	Referendary of the Crown, Deputy Chancellor the Crown	1776–1783	
Franciszek Bieliński	Starosta of Czersk	1776–1783	
Stanisław Poniatowski	Grand Treasurer of Lithuania (1784–1790)	1776–1792	
Michał Mniszech	Secretary of Lithuania (from 1778), Grand Marshal of the Crown (from 1783)	1777–1783	replaced A. Poniński
Szczęsny Potocki	Voivode of Ruthenia, General of Artillery of the Crown	1783–1792	replaced J. Małachowski
Maciej Garnysz	Bishop of Chelmno, Deputy Chancellor the Crown	1783–1790	replaced F. Bieliński
Antoni Małachowski	Grand Clerk of the Crown, Voivode of Mazovia	1783–1792	replaced A. Zamoyski
Michał Radziwiłł	Castellan of Vilnius, Voivode of Vilnius	1783–1792	replaced M. Mniszech
Ignacy Przebendowski	Starosta of Soleck	1785–1791	replaced A. Mokronowski
Feliks Oraczewski		1786–1792	
Kacper Cieciszowski	Bishop of Kiev	1791–1792	replaced M. Garnysz
Antoni Lanckoroński		1791–1792	three together replaced J. Chreptowicz, I. Potocki and I. Przebendowski
Julian Ursyn Niemcewicz		1791–1792	three together replaced J. Chreptowicz, I. Potocki and I. Przebendowski
Ludwik Gutakowski		1791–1792	three together replaced J. Chreptowicz, I. Potocki and I. Przebendowski
