= Grzegorz Piramowicz =

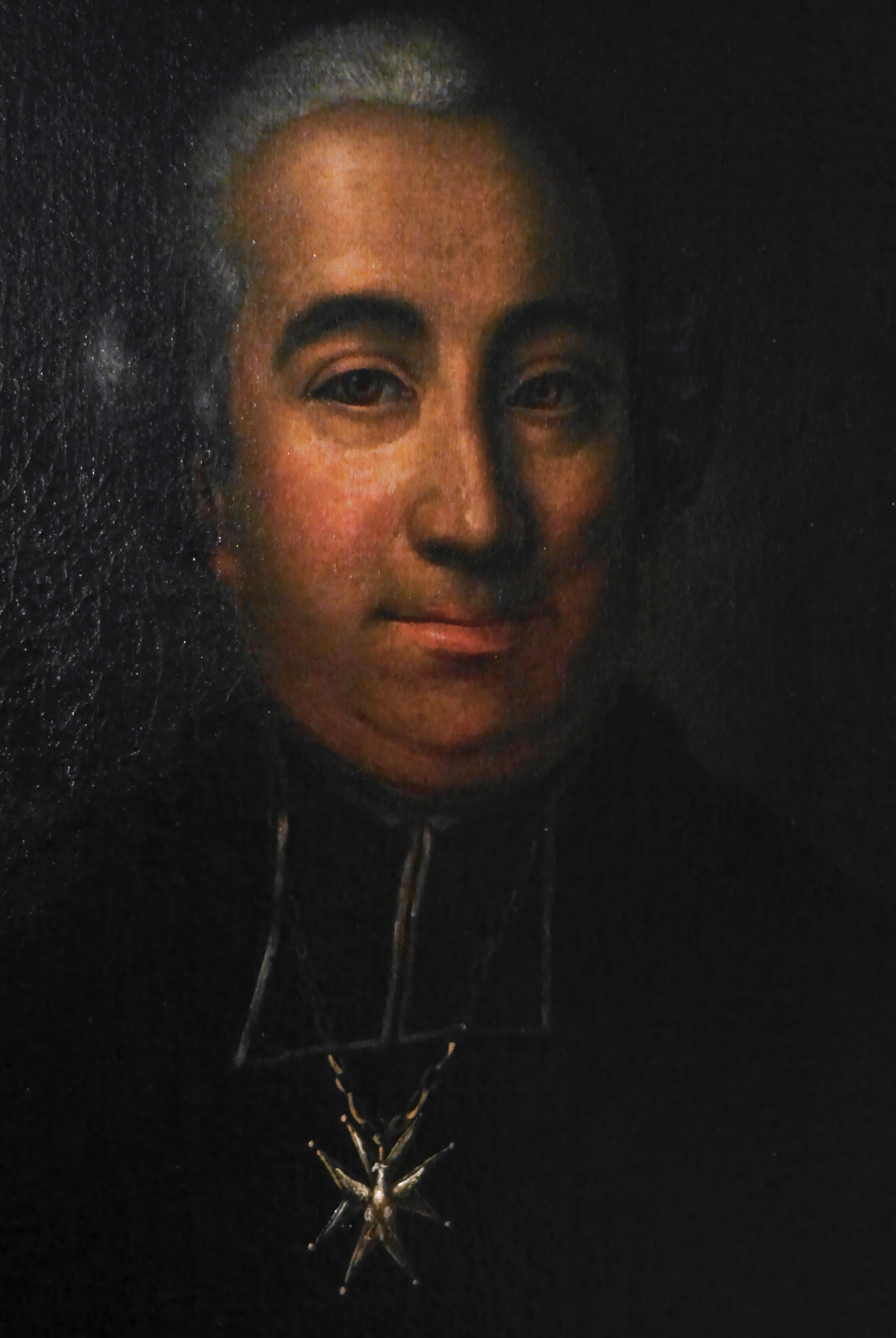
Grzegorz Piramowicz (artist unknown)

Grzegorz Piramowicz (Grigor Pirumyan) (25 November 1735 in Lwów – 14 November 1801 in Międzyrzec Podlaski) was a Polish Roman Catholic priest, educator, writer, and philosopher of Armenian origin. He was a member of the Commission of National Education and Society for Elementary Books, and one of the founders of the Society of Friends of the Constitution.

He was born into an Armenian merchant family.
