= Jerzy Lukowski =

Polish-British historian

- Other name: George Tadeusz Lukowski (or Łukowski)
- Occupation: Historian
- Employer: University of Birmingham
- Known for: Studies of the 18th century Polish–Lithuanian Commonwealth

Jerzy (George) Tadeusz Lukowski (or Łukowski) is a Polish-British historian at University of Birmingham. He specializes in studies of the 18th century Polish–Lithuanian Commonwealth.

== Selected publications ==
- A Concise History of Poland, with Hubert Zawadzki, Cambridge University Press, 1st edition 2001, 2nd edition 2006, ISBN 0-521-61857-6
- Liberty's Folly: The Polish–Lithuanian Commonwealth in the Eighteenth Century, 1697-1795, Routledge, 1991, ISBN 0-415-03228-8
- The Partitions of Poland 1772, 1793, 1795, Longman Publishing Group, 1999, ISBN 0-582-29275-1
- The European Nobility in the Eighteenth Century, Palgrave Macmillan, 2003, ISBN 0-333-65210-X
