= Onufry Kopczyński =

Polish educator and grammarian

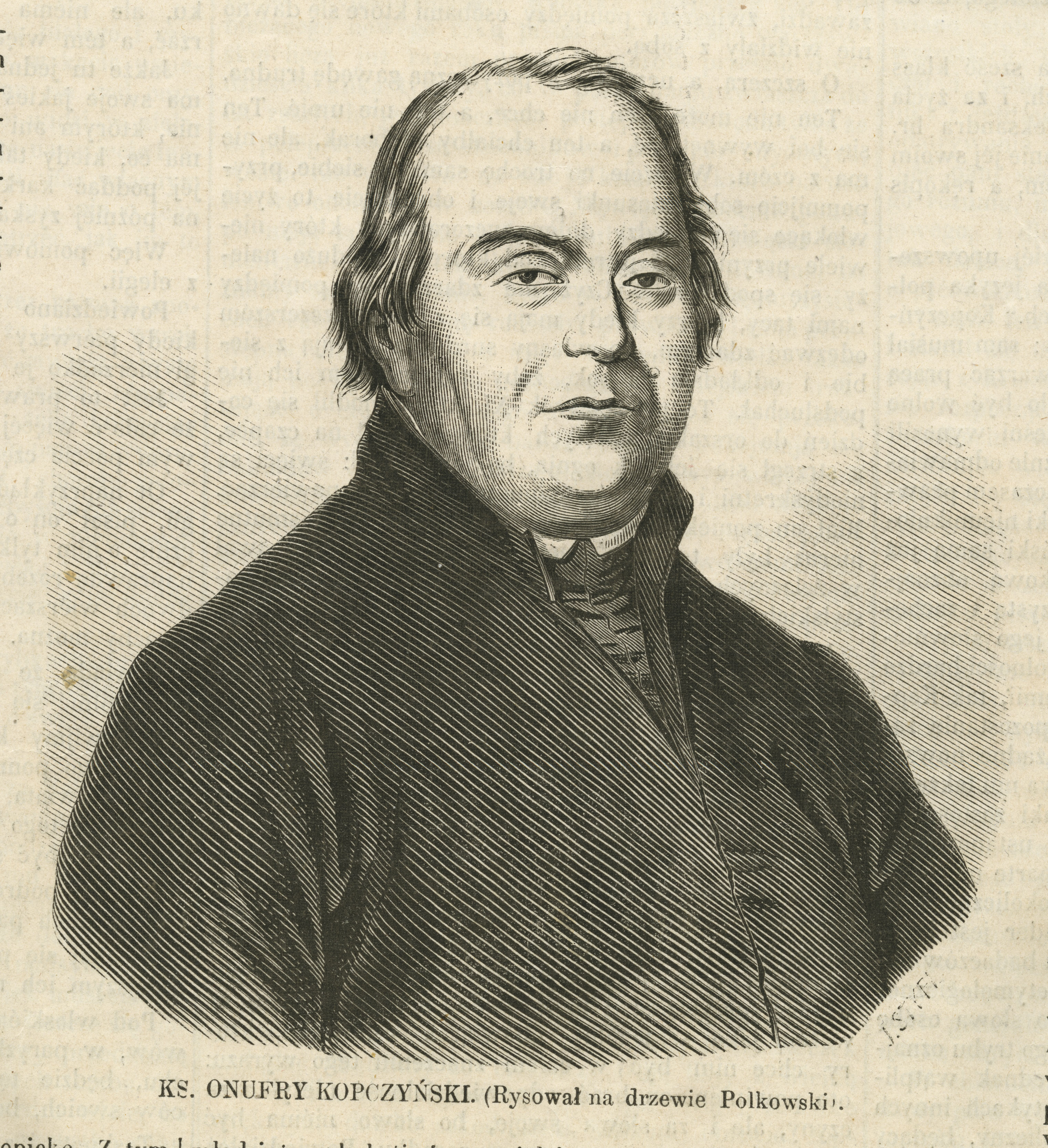
- Born: 30 November 1736; Czerniejewo near Gniezno
- Died: February 14, 1817 (aged 80)
- Known for: educator and grammarian

Onufry Kopczyński (30 November 1736 – 14 February 1817) was an important educator and grammarian of the Polish language during the Polish Enlightenment.

== Life and work ==
Born in Czerniejewo near Gniezno, Kopczyński became an educator with the Piarist order, teaching at Stanisław Konarski's Collegium Nobilium in Warsaw. In 1775 he became a member of the Society for Elementary Textbooks, and in 1809 visitor to the Prussian-Polish schools.

Kopczyński is best known for his efforts to improve the status of the Polish language by making it a principal subject of study in schools. He in fact created Polish grammar terminology. His major work was Gramatyka dla szkół narodowych (A Grammar for the National Schools, 1785), in which he laid out a formal grammar and method of study for the Latin and Polish languages. The part of the book relating to the Polish language would be reprinted many times in the first half of the 19th century.

== Selected publications ==
- Essai de Grammaire Polonaise pratique et raisonnée pour les Français l'an 1807
- Grammatyka języka Polskiego ... Dziéło pozgonné
- Poprawa błędów w ustnéy i pisanéy mowie polskiéy, Warszawa 1808
- Grammatyka dla szkoł narodowych, 1780–1807
- Układ grammatyki dla szkół narodowych z dzieła iuż skończonego wyciagniony, 1785

== See also ==
- List of Poles
- Translation

== Notes ==
- "Kopczynski". Meyers Konversations-Lexikon (in German). Vol. 10 (4th ed.). 1890. pp. 59–60.
