= Society for Elementary Books =

18th-century Polish government agency

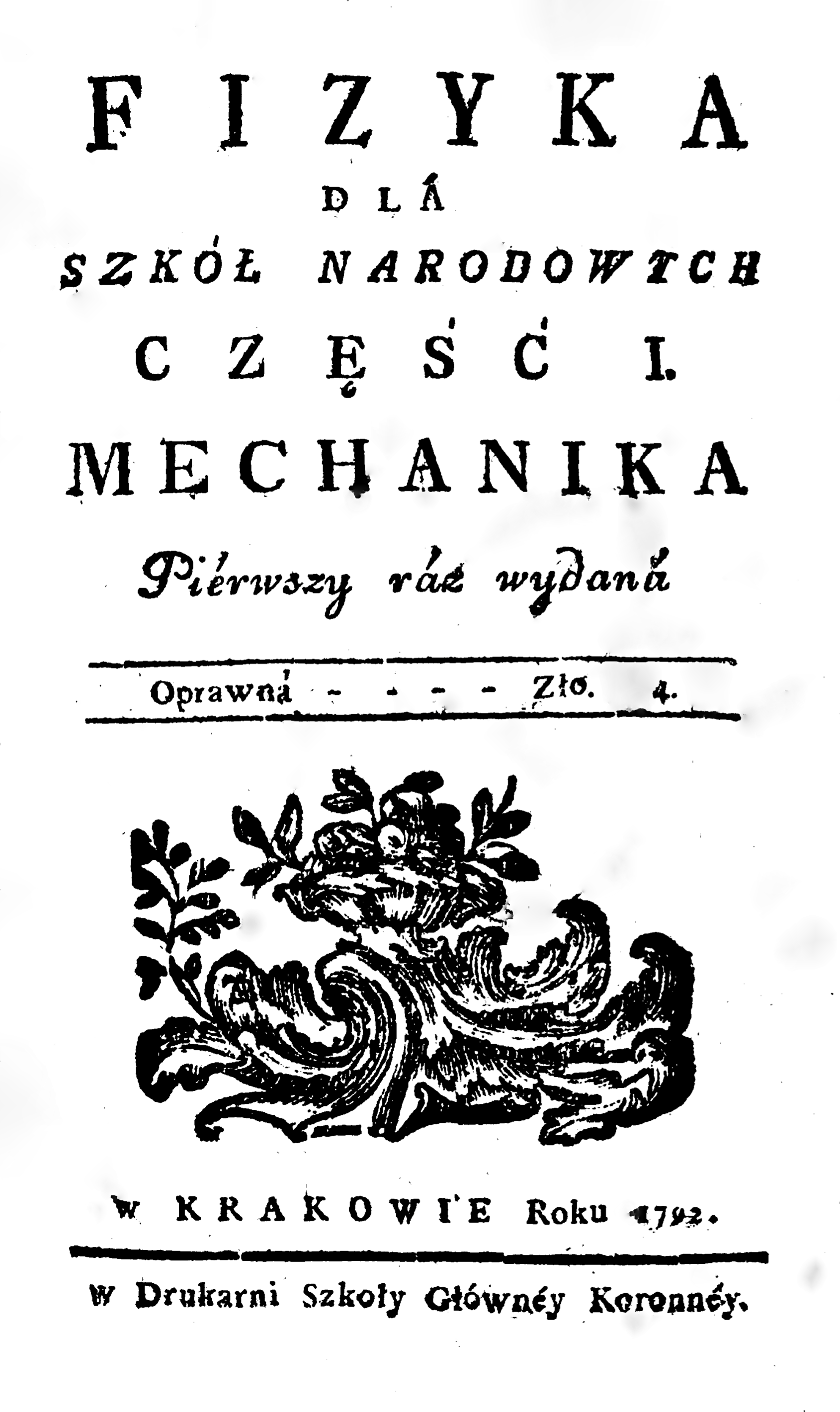
Michał Jan Hube, Fizyka dla szkół narodowych (Physics for national schools), (1792).

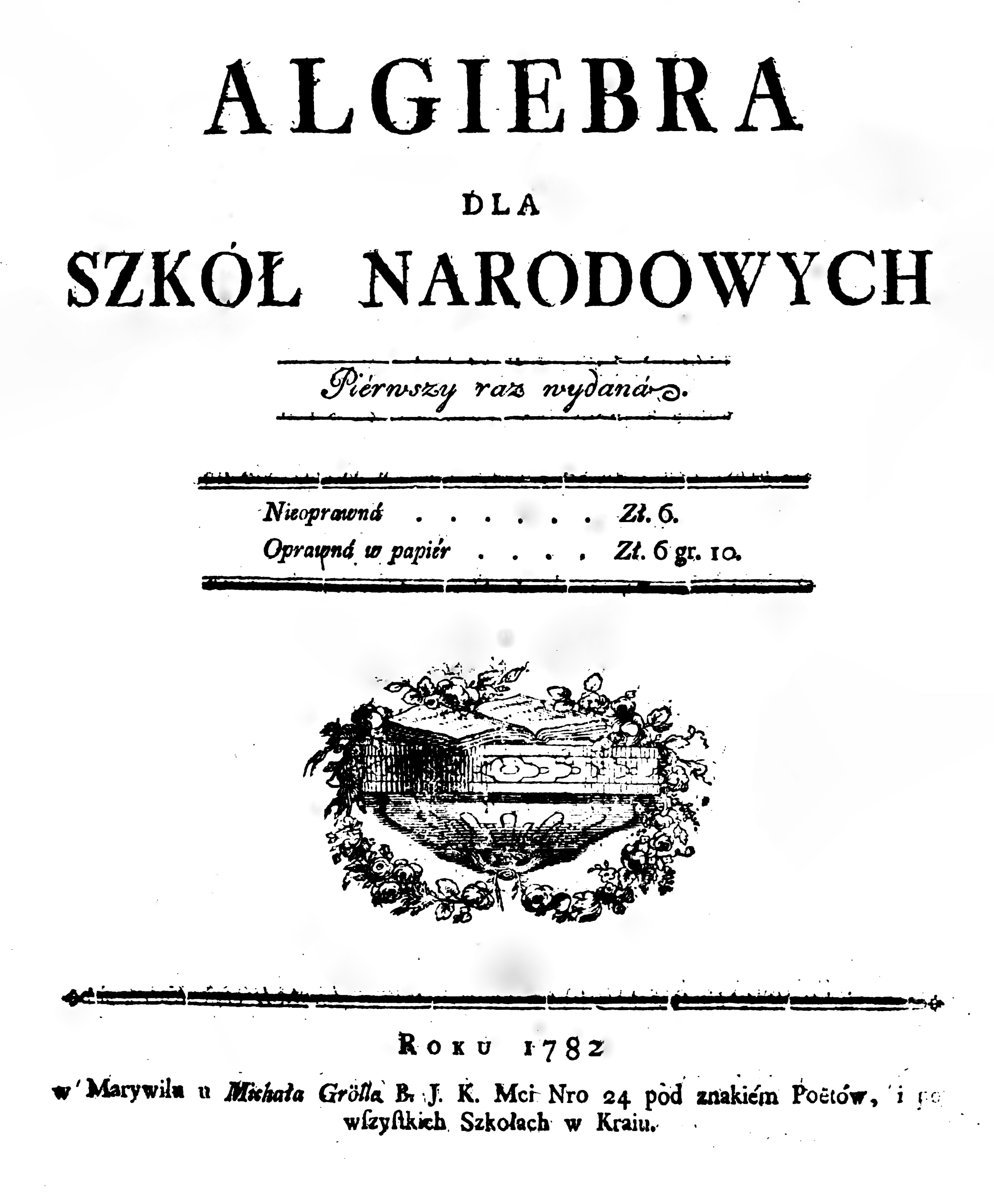
Algiebra dla szkół narodowych (Algebra for national schools) (1782).

The Society for Elementary Books (Polish: Towarzystwo do Ksiąg Elementarnych; 1775–92) was an institution formed by Poland's Commission of National Education (Komisja Edukacji Narodowej) in Warsaw in 1775. The Society's mandate was to design school syllabuses and textbooks for newly reformed schools.

== History ==
Since education in Poland had until then been conducted mostly in Latin, the Commission of National Education faced the problem of an almost complete lack of textbooks. It was to cope with this that the Society for Elementary Books was formed. The scientists who worked on the new Polish-language textbooks often had to invent the requisite specialized vocabulary. Much of the vocabulary that they invented, related to chemistry, physics, mathematics and grammar, is still in use today, and some of the Society's textbooks were in use as late as the Second Polish Republic (1918–39)

The chairman of the Society for Elementary Books, in the years 1775-1791 was Ignacy Potocki, and in 1792 Julian Ursyn Niemcewicz. The main secretary, in the years 1775–1787, was Grzegorz Piramowicz, later Franciszek Zabłocki. Significant contributions to the Society's activities were put by Hugo Kołłątaj. The ordinary members of the Society were also: John the Baptist Albertrandi, Józef Bogucicki, Paweł Czempiński, Jędrzej Gawroński, Szymon L'Huillier, Szczepan Hołowczyc, Adam Jakukiewicz, Grzegorz Kniażewicz, Józef Koblański Onufry Kopczyński, Feliks Łojko, Kazimierz Narbutt, Antoni Popławski, Stefan Roussel, Sebastian Sierakowski, Józef Wybicki and scientific directors in Corps of Cadets (Warsaw) - Christian Pfleiderer (German professor of mathematics) and Michał Jan Hube. The honorary members of the Society were: Jan Dubois de Jancigny, Piotr Samuel Dupont de Nemours and Scipione Piattoli.

Famous books created by the Society included Elementarz dla szkół parafialnych and Gramatyka dla szkół narodowych z przypisami. The Society was chaired by Ignacy Potocki, and its general secretary was Grzegorz Piramowicz. Hugo Kołłątaj made many important contributions to the Society's projects. Members included Onufry Kopczyński, Kazimierz Narbutt, Józef Wybicki and the academic directors of the Warsaw Corps of Cadets—Ch. Pfleiderer (mathematics) and Michał Jan Hube.

The Society was dissolved in 1792, in anticipation of the coming total dissolution of the Polish state.

== Results of activities ==
The Society, during its 17 years of activity, held 631 meetings (an average of 3 meetings per month). A total of about 30 elementary book items intended for students or teachers were prepared and published, including 5 compiled by foreign scholars. The results of his work included the creation of such textbooks as: Elementary for Parish Schools and Grammar for National Schools with Footnotes.

=== Publications ===
In 1775, the Commission of National Education issued a "Notice with respect to the writing of elementary books for provincial schools" addressed to authors who were qualified to write them. The proclamation was translated for foreign authors into Latin and French. Its contents announced an international competition for elementary publications for elementary education, in which the following financial prizes were set: for mathematics and for the more necessary knowledge of the sciences, 100 red zlotys each were promised; for physics and mechanics, a book on farming, 150; for natural history, logic, a book on pronunciation and poetry, 50 red zlotys each.

== Bibliography ==
- (in Polish) T. Wierzbowski: Komisja Edukacji Narodowej 1773-1794. Monografia historyczna, t. 1: A. Opracowania i źródła drukowane, B. Źródła archiwalne, Warszawa 1911.
- A. Jobert: La Commission d'Éducation Nationale en Polgne (1773-1794). Son oeuvre d'instruction civique, Paryż 1941, s. 1-24.
