= Antoni Popławski =

Antoni Popławski (1739–1799) was a Polish Piarist educator and economist. A physiocrat and a proponent of the emancipation of serfs, in 1774 he coined the term "noble democracy" to describe the political system of the Polish–Lithuanian Commonwealth. Popławski was born and died in Kraków.

== Works ==
- O rozporzadzeniu i wydoskonaleniu edukacji obywatelskiej (1774) Available on Google Books.
- Moralna nauka dla szkól narodowych (1778)
