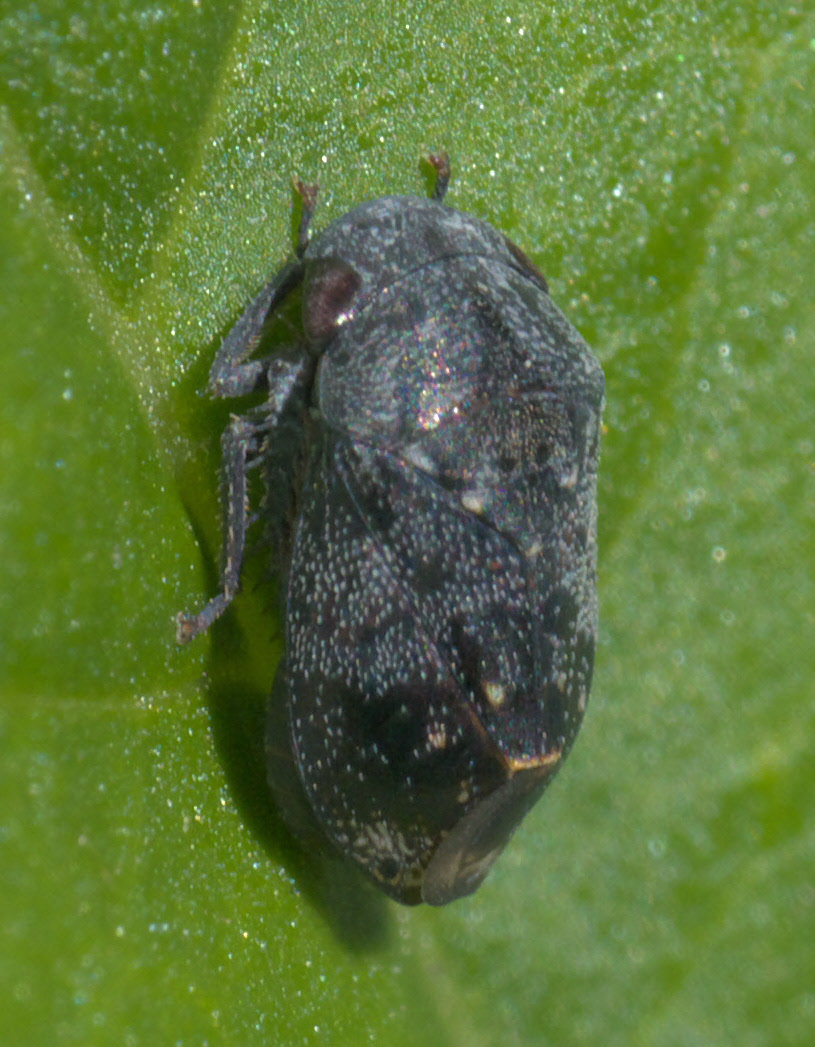
- Penthimia americana

Scientific classification
- Kingdom: Animalia
- Phylum: Arthropoda
- Class: Insecta
- Order: Hemiptera
- Suborder: Auchenorrhyncha
- Family: Cicadellidae
- Subfamily: Deltocephalinae
- Tribe: Penthimiini; Kirschbaum, 1868

Genera
- 46, see text.

Synonyms
- Thaumatoscopini Baker, 1923

= Penthimiini =

Tribe of true bugs

Penthimiini is a tribe of leafhoppers in the subfamily Deltocephalinae. Penthimiini contains 46 genera and over 200 species.

== Genera ==
There are currently 46 described genera in Penthimiini:

- Alopenthimia Evans, 1972
- Amberbakia Distant, 1912
- Chanohirata Hayashi & Machida, 1996
- Chinaella Evans, 1935
- Ectopiocephalus Kirkaldy, 1906
- Eovulturnops Evans, 1947
- Eupenthimia Evans, 1972
- Eusallya Evans, 1972
- Foroa Linnavuori, 1977
- Gressittella Evans, 1972
- Haranga Distant, 1908
- Irenaella Linnavuori, 1977
- Jafar Kirkaldy, 1903
- Kronos Distant, 1917
- Ledroides Dammerman, 1910
- Macutella Evans, 1972
- Malichus Distant, 1918
- Megalopenthimia Evans, 1954
- Musosa Linnavuori, 1977
- Neodartellus Evans, 1955
- Neodartus Melichar, 1903
- Neopenthimia Evans, 1972
- Neovulturnus Evans, 1937
- Nielsoniella Linnavuori, 1977
- Nortoides Evans, 1972
- Nubelella Evans, 1972
- Nubelloides Evans, 1972
- Osella Evans, 1972
- Penthimia Germar, 1821
- Penthimidia Haglund, 1899
- Penthimiella Evans, 1972
- Penthimiola Linnavuori, 1959
- Penthimiopsis Evans, 1972
- Pentria Evans, 1972
- Piorella Evans, 1972
- Platyscopus Evans, 1941
- Reticuluma Cheng & Li, 2005
- Sidelloides Evans, 1972
- Tambila Distant, 1908
- Thaumatopoides Evans, 1947
- Thaumatoscopus Kirkaldy, 1906
- Tolasella Evans, 1972
- Tomaloides Evans, 1972
- Uzelina Melichar, 1903
- Vertigella Evans, 1972
- Vulturnus Kirkaldy, 1906
