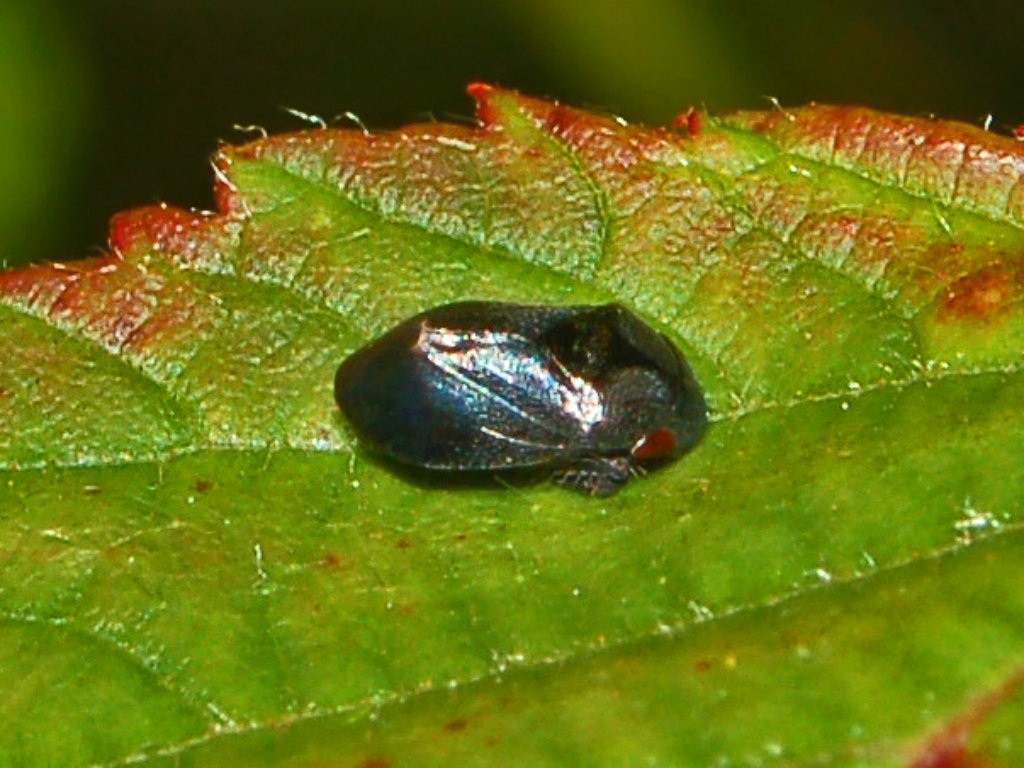
- Penthimia nigra, typical form
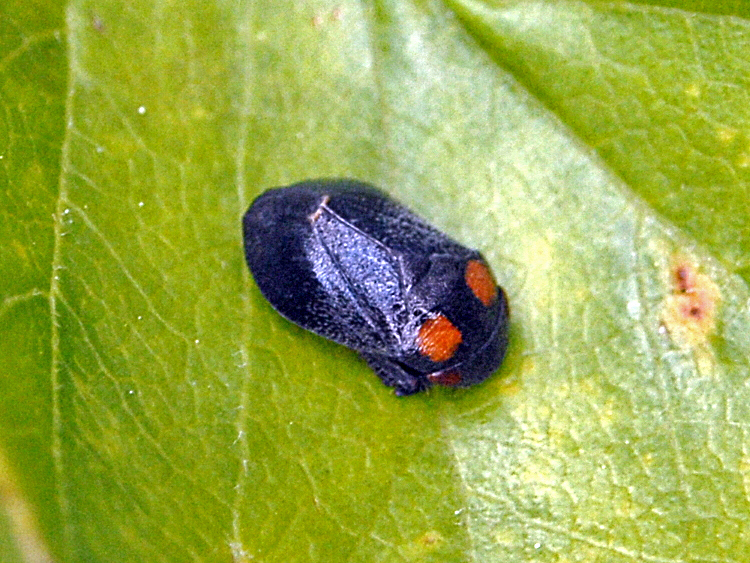
- Penthimia nigra, red-spotted form

Scientific classification
- Kingdom: Animalia
- Phylum: Arthropoda
- Clade: Pancrustacea
- Class: Insecta
- Order: Hemiptera
- Suborder: Auchenorrhyncha
- Family: Cicadellidae
- Genus: Penthimia
- Species: P. nigra

Binomial name
- Penthimia nigra (Goeze, 1778)

= Penthimia nigra =

Species of true bug

Penthimia nigra is a species of leafhoppers belonging to the family Cicadellidae subfamily Deltocephalinae.

== Description ==
The adults reach 4–6 millimetres (0.16–0.24 in) of length. The coloration of the body varies from black (typical form) to reddish brown, with two orange spots or more or less extended reddish areas on the pronotum. The eyes are reddish brown. The forewings overlap on the end of the abdomen. In this species is quite evident the row of spines on the tibia 3 characterizing Cicadellidae.

Adult leafhoppers can mostly be encountered from April through July feeding on sap of deciduous trees, especially poplars (Populus species) and oaks (Quercus species). Although fit to fly, they sometimes prefer to jump away when disturbed. They may have just one generation per year and the larva overwinters.

== Distribution ==
This species is present in most of Europe and in the Near East.
