= Minucella =

Scientific classification
- Kingdom: Animalia
- Phylum: Arthropoda
- Clade: Pancrustacea
- Class: Insecta
- Order: Hemiptera
- Suborder: Auchenorrhyncha
- Family: Cicadellidae
- Subfamily: Deltocephalinae
- Tribe: Stegelytrini
- Genus: Minucella; Wei, Zhang & Webb, 2008

Diversity
- 5 species (see text)

Genus of leafhoppers

Minucella is a genus of deltocephalin leafhoppers that belongs to the tribe Stegelytrini. Members of this genus can be found in southern China.

== Taxonomy ==
The genus was established in 2008 by Cong Wei, Ya-Lin Zhang and Michael D. Webb. When it was established, it contained two species M. divaricata and M. leucomaculata. Then three new species discovered in 2026 would be described: M. angusta, M. dilatata and M. elongata.

=== Species ===
This genus currently contains five species. They are listed below:

- Minucella angusta Duan, Li, Webb & Xing 2026
- Minucella dilatata Duan, Li, Webb & Xing 2026
- Minucella divaricata Wei, Zhang & Webb, 2008
- Minucella elongata Duan, Li, Webb & Xing 2026
- Minucella leucomaculata Wei, Zhang & Webb, 2008
