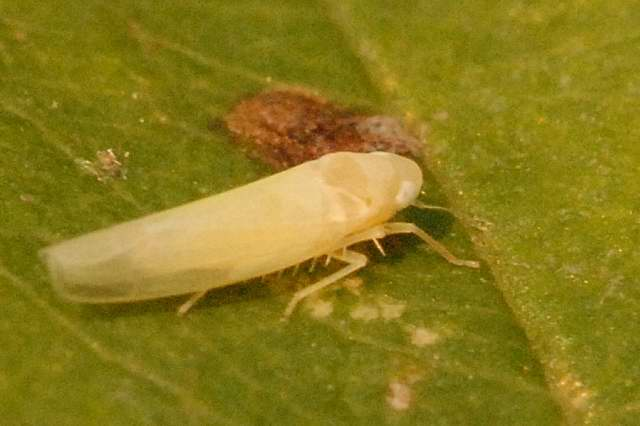
- Rhopalopyx vitripennis

Scientific classification
- Kingdom: Animalia
- Phylum: Arthropoda
- Class: Insecta
- Order: Hemiptera
- Suborder: Auchenorrhyncha
- Family: Cicadellidae
- Subfamily: Deltocephalinae
- Tribe: Cicadulini
- Genus: Rhopalopyx; Ribaut, 1939

= Rhopalopyx =

Genus of true bugs

Rhopalopyx is a genus of true bugs belonging to the family Cicadellidae.

The species of this genus are found in Europe.

Species:

- Rhopalopyx adumbrata (C.Sahlberg, 1842)
- Rhopalopyx brachyanus Orosz, 1999
