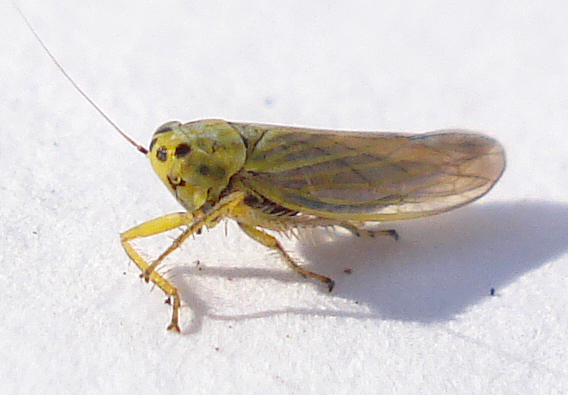
- Cicadula aurantipes

Scientific classification
- Domain: Eukaryota
- Kingdom: Animalia
- Phylum: Arthropoda
- Class: Insecta
- Order: Hemiptera
- Suborder: Auchenorrhyncha
- Family: Cicadellidae
- Subfamily: Deltocephalinae
- Tribe: Cicadulini
- Genus: Cicadula; Zetterstedt, 1840

= Cicadula =

Genus of true bugs

Cicadula is a genus of true bugs belonging to the family Cicadellidae.

The genus was first described by Zetterstedt in 1840.

== Species ==
Species of the genus Cicadula are found in Europe, North America, and southern Africa. The following species are recognised in the genus Cicadula:

- Cicadula albingensis Wagner, 1940
- Cicadula arevaloi Merino, 1936
- Cicadula aurantipes (Edwards, 1894)
- Cicadula ciliata (Osborn, 1898)
- Cicadula clypeata Melichar, 1904
- Cicadula colorata Osborn, 1934
- Cicadula compressa Rao, 1989
- Cicadula cyperacea (Osborn, 1898)
- Cicadula flori (Sahlberg, 1871)
- Cicadula frontalis (Herrich-Schäffer, 1835)
- Cicadula intermedia (Boheman, 1845)
- Cicadula junea Hamilton, 1972
- Cicadula kartali Zeybekoğlu, 2010
- Cicadula lineatopunctata (Matsumura, 1908)
- Cicadula longiseta (Van Duzee, 1892)
- Cicadula longiventris (Sahlberg, 1871)
- Cicadula melanogaster (Provancher, 1872)
- Cicadula mesasiatica Dubovsky, 1966
- Cicadula mutilla Ribaut, 1952
- Cicadula nigricornis (Sahlberg, 1871)
- Cicadula ornata (Melichar, 1900)
- Cicadula persimilis (Edwards, 1920)
- Cicadula placida (Horváth, 1897)
- Cicadula quadripunctata (de Villers, 1789)
- Cicadula quinquenotata (Boheman, 1845)
- Cicadula ramenta Emeljanov, 1989
- Cicadula saliens Hamilton, 1976
- Cicadula saturata (Edwards, 1915)
- Cicadula saxosa Scudder, 1890
- Cicadula scutellata Vayssière, 1930
- Cicadula simlaensis Viraktamath & Yeshwanth, 2017
- Cicadula smithi (Van Duzee, 1892)
- Cicadula straminea
- Cicadula subcupraea (Provancher, 1872)
- Cicadula sulphurella Zetterstedt, 1828
- Cicadula tenga Vilbaste, 1965
- Cicadula vilbastei Zahniser, McKamey & Dmitriev, 2012
- Cicadula vittipennis
- BOLD:ABA5840 (Cicadula sp.)
- BOLD:ACI5705 (Cicadula sp.)
- BOLD:ACI6795 (Cicadula sp.)
- BOLD:ACY2167 (Cicadula sp.)
- BOLD:ACY3071 (Cicadula sp.)
- BOLD:ACZ3804 (Cicadula sp.)
- BOLD:ADU9726 (Cicadula sp.)
