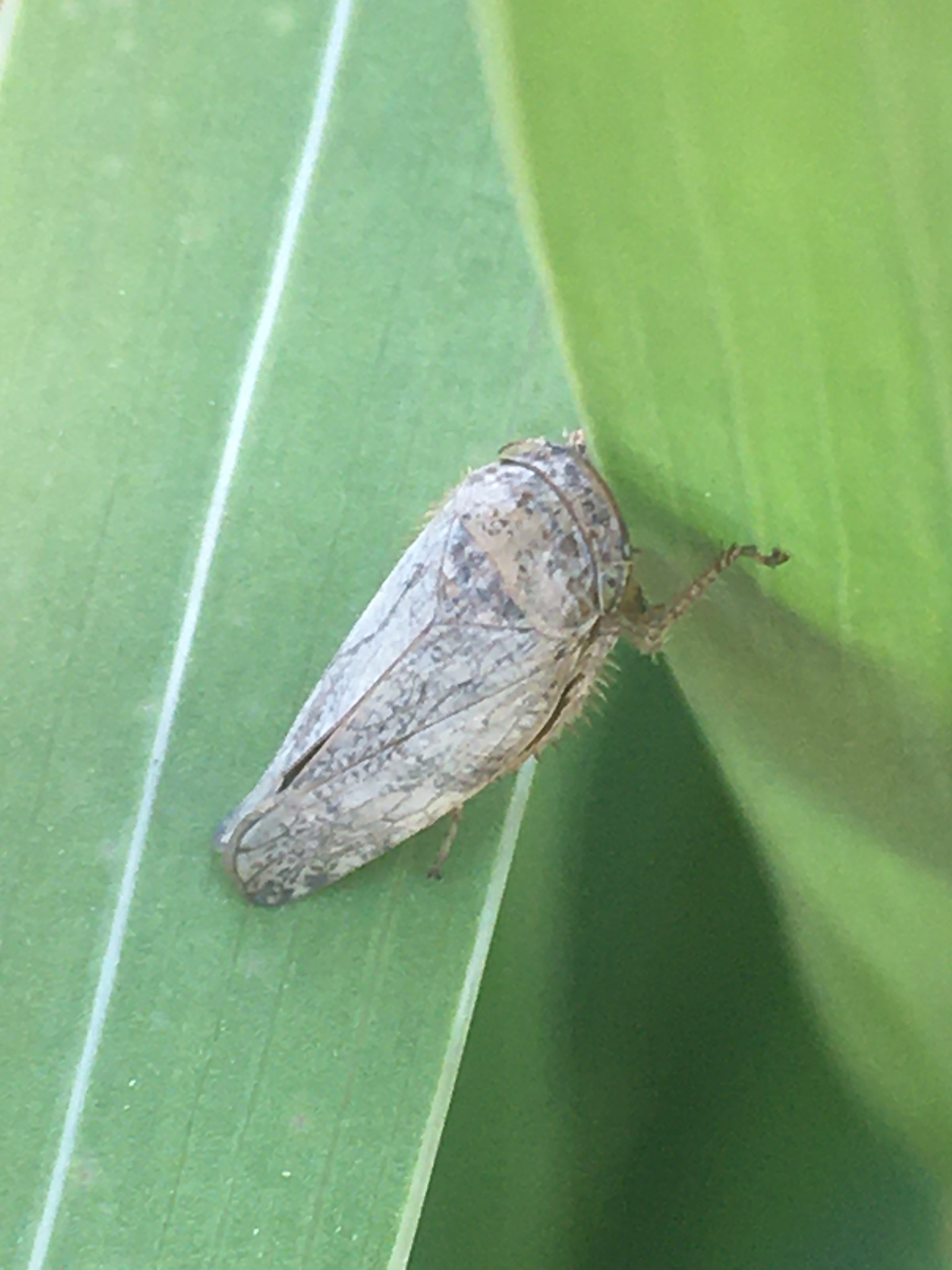
- Selenocephalus sp.

Scientific classification
- Kingdom: Animalia
- Phylum: Arthropoda
- Class: Insecta
- Order: Hemiptera
- Suborder: Auchenorrhyncha
- Family: Cicadellidae
- Subfamily: Deltocephalinae
- Tribe: Selenocephalini
- Genus: Selenocephalus; Germar, 1833

Synonyms
- Levantotettix Lindberg, 1953; Selanocephalus Germar, 1833; Solenocephalus Germar, 1833 and other orthographic variants

= Selenocephalus =

Genus of leafhoppers

Selenocephalus is a genus of leafhoppers in the subfamily Deltocephalinae and typical of the tribe Selenocephalini; it was erected by Ernst Friedrich Germar in 1833. Species have been recorded from Africa, southern Europe and mostly western parts of Asia.

== Species ==
The Global Biodiversity Information Facility includes:

1. Selenocephalus abbreviatus Melichar, 1896
2. Selenocephalus aegyptiacus Dlabola, 1974
3. Selenocephalus amasycus Dlabola, 1977
4. Selenocephalus anatolicus Dlabola, 1957
5. Selenocephalus ankarae Dlabola, 1957
6. Selenocephalus armeniacus Lindberg, 1960
7. Selenocephalus asir Dlabola, 1980
8. Selenocephalus bytinskii Lindberg, 1953
9. Selenocephalus conspersus (Herrich-Schäffer, 1834)
10. Selenocephalus dareicus Dlabola, 1981
11. Selenocephalus deserticola Linnavuori, 1962
12. Selenocephalus dlabolae Rodrigues, 1968
13. Selenocephalus dlabolai Rodrigues, 1968
14. Selenocephalus flavicosta Linnavuori, 1962
15. Selenocephalus griseus Auth?
16. Selenocephalus hafezicus Dlabola, 1981
17. Selenocephalus harterti Bergevin, 1926
18. Selenocephalus horaki Dlabola, 1977
19. Selenocephalus invarius (Walker, 1851)
20. Selenocephalus kalalae Dlabola, 1952
21. Selenocephalus kyrosicus Dlabola, 1981
22. Selenocephalus lusitanicus Signoret, 1880
23. Selenocephalus mauretanicus Lindberg, 1953
24. Selenocephalus moreanus Dlabola, 1977
25. Selenocephalus nervosus Lindberg, 1948
26. Selenocephalus nizamicus Dlabola, 1981
27. Selenocephalus obesiusculus Emeljanov, 1972
28. Selenocephalus obsoletus (Germar, 1817) - type species
29. Selenocephalus pallens Lindberg, 1948
30. Selenocephalus pallidus Kirschbaum, 1868
31. Selenocephalus saadicus Dlabola, 1981
32. Selenocephalus sacarraoi Rodrigues, 1968
33. Selenocephalus sirvadi Dlabola, 1965
34. Selenocephalus striatus (Lindberg, 1953)
35. Selenocephalus tapan Dlabola, 1981
36. Selenocephalus uvarovi Zakhvatkin, 1946
37. Selenocephalus wagneri Dlabola, 1974
38. Selenocephalus zagrosicus Dlabola, 1974
