= Taurotettix =

Scientific classification
- Domain: Eukaryota
- Kingdom: Animalia
- Phylum: Arthropoda
- Class: Insecta
- Order: Hemiptera
- Suborder: Auchenorrhyncha
- Family: Cicadellidae
- Subfamily: Deltocephalinae
- Tribe: Cicadulini
- Genus: Taurotettix; Haupt, 1929

Type species
- Thamnotettix beckeri Fieber, 1885

Species
- 4, see text

Synonyms
- Callistrophia Emeljanov, 1962

Genus of true bugs

Taurotettix is a genus of leafhoppers in the tribe Cicadulini. The genus is widely distributed across Eurasia with one species (T. beckeri) found in Algeria.

== Species ==
There are currently 4 described species in Taurotettix:

- Taurotettix beckeri (Fieber, 1885)
- Taurotettix elegans (Melichar, 1900)
- Taurotettix modestus (Mitjaev, 1971)
- Taurotettix subornatus (Mitjaev, 1971)
