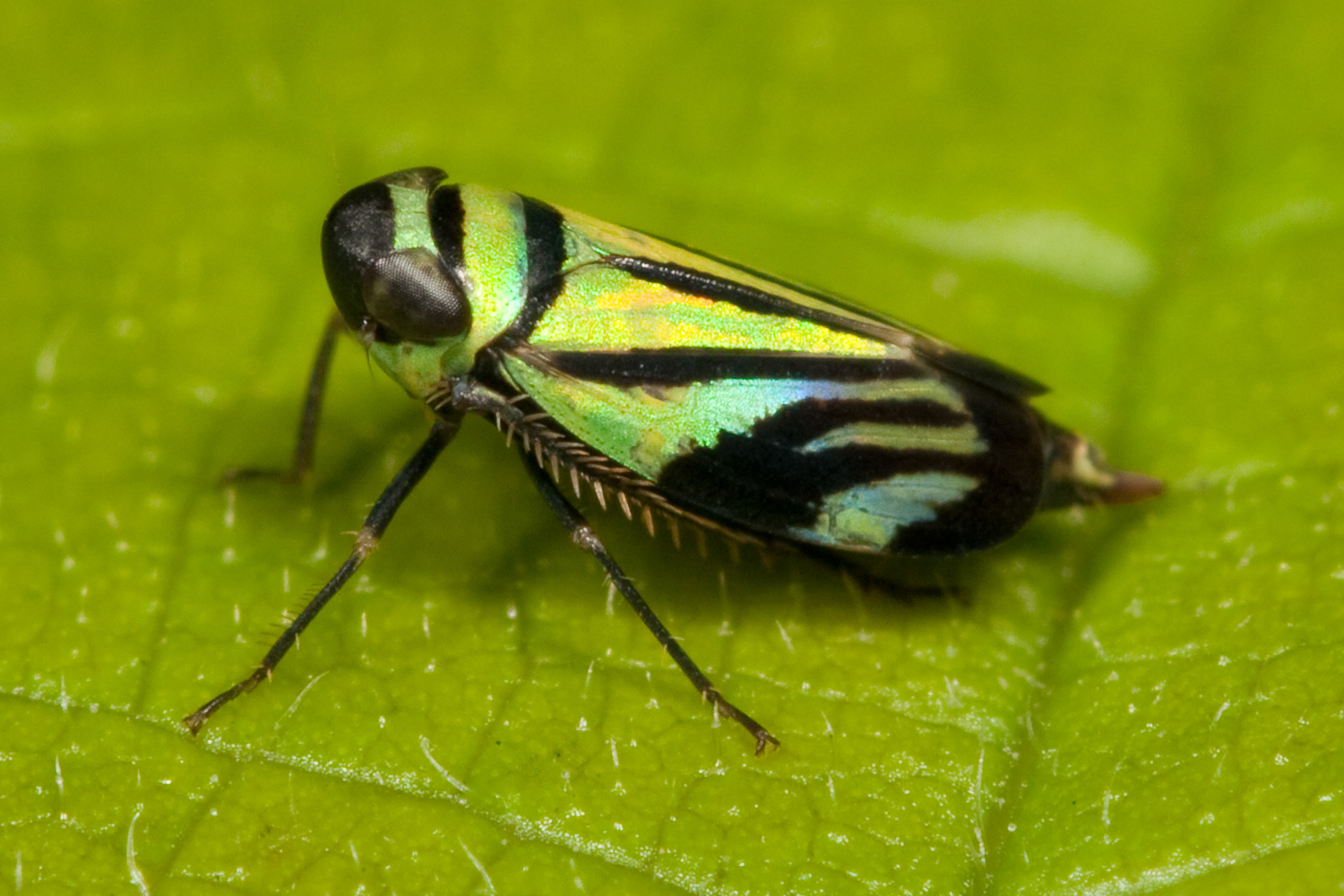
- Stirellus bicolor
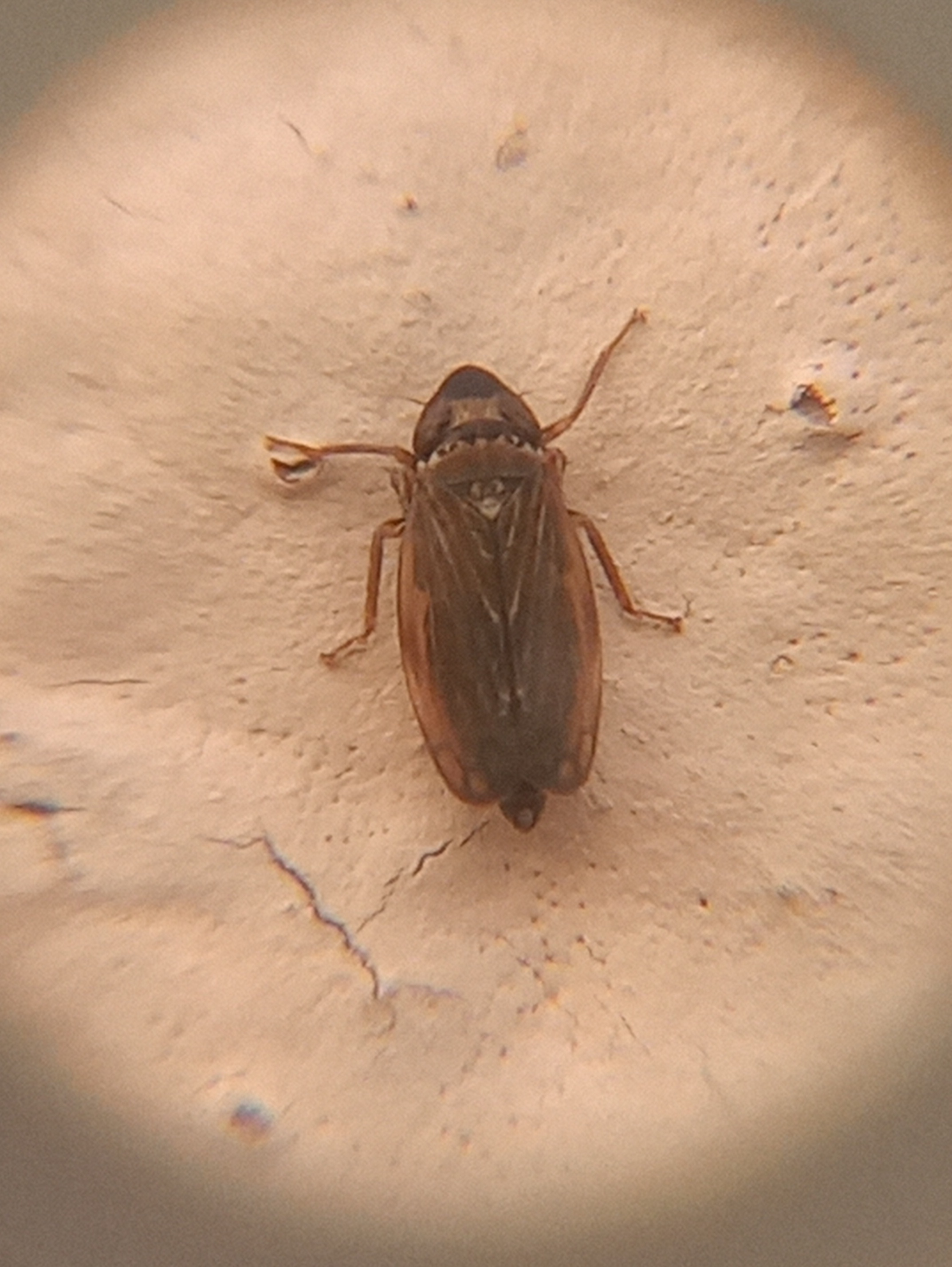
- Stirellus bicolor

Scientific classification
- Domain: Eukaryota
- Kingdom: Animalia
- Phylum: Arthropoda
- Class: Insecta
- Order: Hemiptera
- Suborder: Auchenorrhyncha
- Family: Cicadellidae
- Subfamily: Deltocephalinae
- Tribe: Stenometopiini
- Genus: Stirellus; Osborn & Ball, 1902

= Stirellus =

Genus of true bugs

Stirellus is a genus of leafhoppers belonging to the family Cicadellidae.

== Species ==
Recognized species of Stirellus include:

- Stirellus affinis
- Stirellus atropuncta
- Stirellus beameri
- Stirellus bicolor
- Stirellus convexus
- Stirellus curtipenis
- Stirellus dixianus
- Stirellus fasciata
- Stirellus flavovirescens
- Stirellus fraterna
- Stirellus illustrata
- Stirellus labiata
- Stirellus mexicanus
- Stirellus mitis
- Stirellus nigripectus
- Stirellus obrienorum
- Stirellus osborni
- Stirellus peshawarensis
- Stirellus picinus
- Stirellus sagittaria
- Stirellus samoanus
- Stirellus subnubilus
- Stirellus tauensis
- Stirellus thattaensis
- Stirellus torresi
- Stirellus vana
