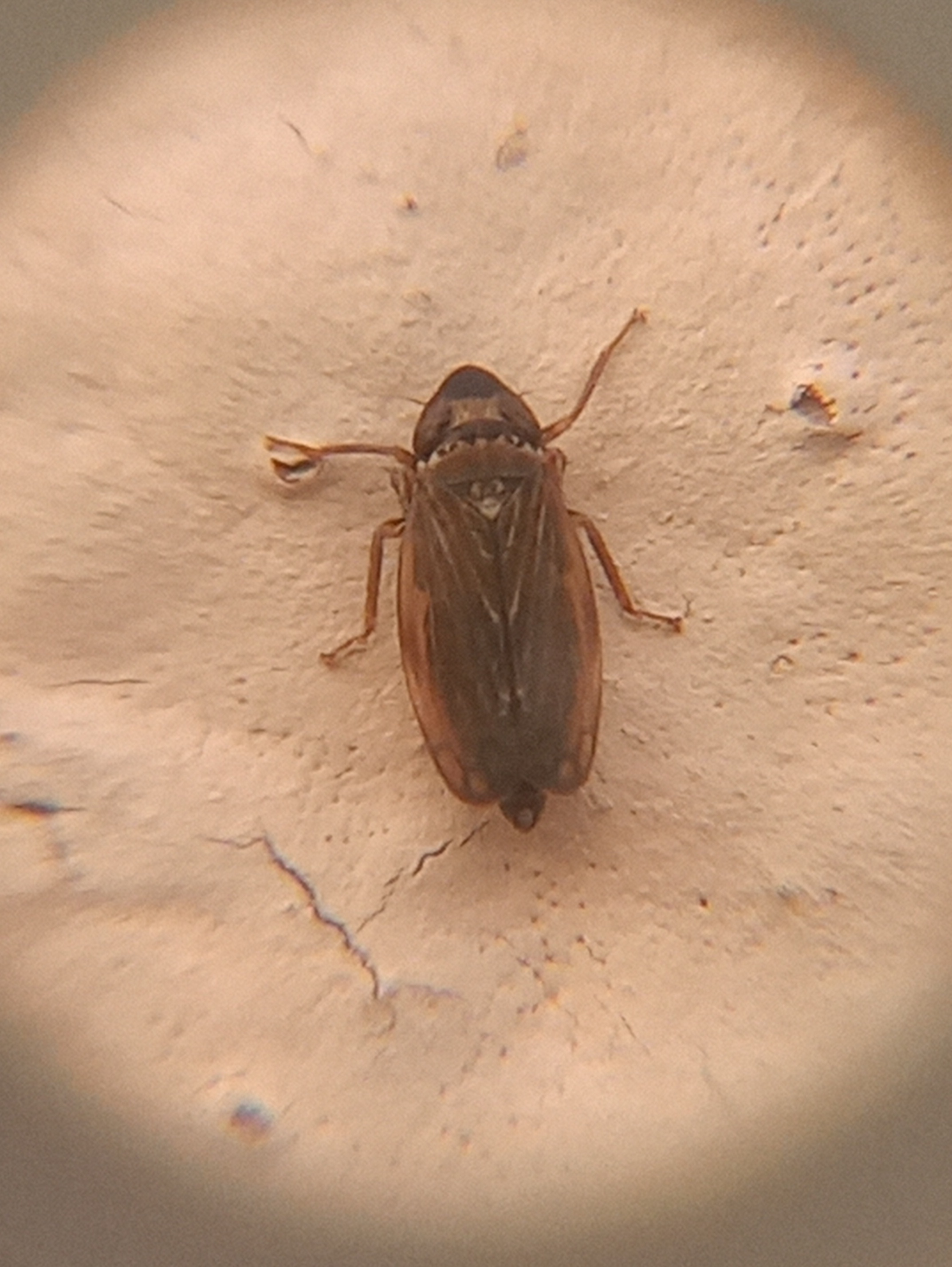
- Stirellus bicolor

Scientific classification
- Kingdom: Animalia
- Phylum: Arthropoda
- Clade: Pancrustacea
- Class: Insecta
- Order: Hemiptera
- Suborder: Auchenorrhyncha
- Family: Cicadellidae
- Subfamily: Deltocephalinae
- Tribe: Eupelicini
- Subtribe: Stenometopiina; Baker, 1923

Synonyms
- Stirellini Emeljanov, 1966

= Stenometopiina =

Tribe of true bugs

Stenometopiina is a subtribe of leafhoppers in tribe Eupelicini and subfamily Deltocephalinae. The members of Stenometopiini are widespread and have a cosmopolitan distribution.

== Genera ==
The following genera of Stenometopiina are currently valid:

1. Anaconura Emeljanov, 1999
2. Anemolua Kirkaldy, 1906
3. Doratulina Melichar, 1903 (includes subgenus Paivanana Distant, 1918)
4. Hodoedocus (insect) Jacobi, 1910
5. Kinonia Ball, 1933
6. Stirellus Osborn & Ball, 1902 (synonym Giffardia Kirkaldy, 1906)
7. Trebellius Distant, 1918
