= Acinopterus =

- Acinopterus acuminatus

Scientific classification
- Kingdom: Animalia
- Phylum: Arthropoda
- Clade: Pancrustacea
- Class: Insecta
- Order: Hemiptera
- Suborder: Auchenorrhyncha
- Family: Cicadellidae
- Subfamily: Deltocephalinae
- Tribe: Acinopterini
- Genus: Acinopterus; Van Duzee, 1892

Genus of true bugs

Acinopterus is a genus of leafhoppers in the family Cicadellidae. There are more than 30 species described in the genus Acinopterus. The members of Acinopterus are widely distributed across North and South America. Acinopterus is the type genus of the tribe Acinopterini.

== Species ==
- Acinopterus acuminatus Van Duzee, 1892
- Acinopterus angulatus Lawson, 1922 (angulate leafhopper)
- Acinopterus brunneus Ball, 1903
- Acinopterus centralis Freytag, 1993
- Acinopterus corniger Beamer & Lawson, 1938
- Acinopterus excavatus Beamer & Lawson, 1938
- Acinopterus fuscifrons Lawson, 1931
- Acinopterus gentilis Berg, 1879
- Acinopterus godoyae Freytag, 1993
- Acinopterus igualanus Linnavuori & DeLong, 1977
- Acinopterus inflatus Lawson, 1927
- Acinopterus inornatus Baker, 1895
- Acinopterus lawsoni Linnavuori & DeLong, 1977
- Acinopterus molestus Beamer & Lawton, 1938
- Acinopterus morongoensis Knull, 1944
- Acinopterus obtutus Lawson, 1922
- Acinopterus parallelus Beamer, 1944
- Acinopterus parvulus Lawson
- Acinopterus pennatus Beamer & Lawson, 1938
- Acinopterus perdicoensis Linnavuori & DeLong, 1977
- Acinopterus plenus Beamer & Lawson, 1938
- Acinopterus productus Lawson, 1922
- Acinopterus pulchellus Lawson, 1927
- Acinopterus quadricornis Beamer & Lawson, 1938
- Acinopterus rileyi Lawson, 1927
- Acinopterus rostratus Beamer & Lawson, 1938
- Acinopterus rubicundus Beamer & Lawson, 1938
- Acinopterus rubrus Lawson, 1931
- Acinopterus viridis Ball, 1903
