= Elymana =

Scientific classification
- Domain: Eukaryota
- Kingdom: Animalia
- Phylum: Arthropoda
- Class: Insecta
- Order: Hemiptera
- Suborder: Auchenorrhyncha
- Family: Cicadellidae
- Subfamily: Deltocephalinae
- Tribe: Cicadulini
- Genus: Elymana; DeLong, 1936

Genus of true bugs

Elymana is a genus of true bugs belonging to the family Cicadellidae.

The species of this genus are found in Europe and Northern America.

Species:

- Elymana acuma DeLong, 1936
- Elymana caduca
