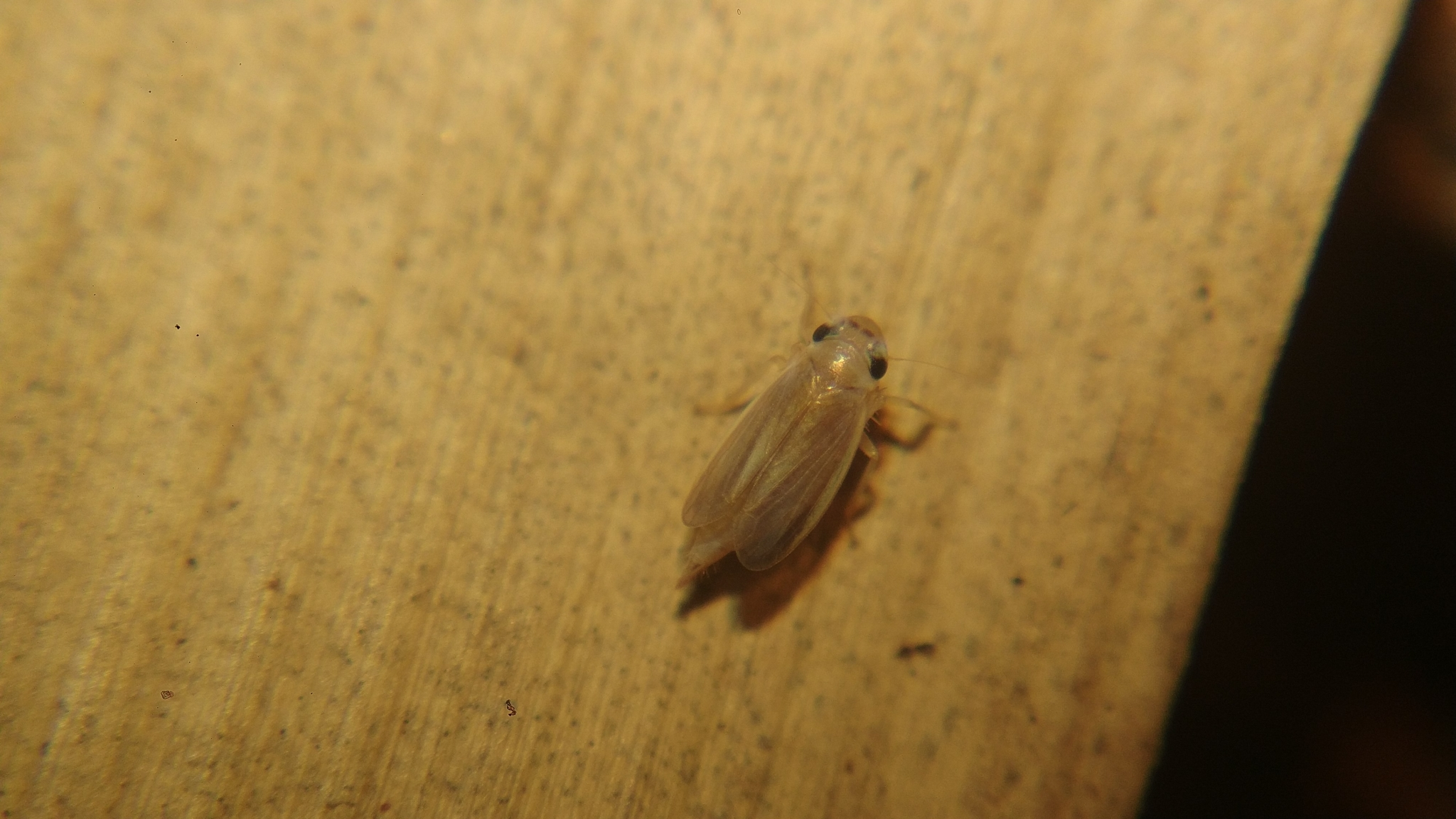

Scientific classification
- Kingdom: Animalia
- Phylum: Arthropoda
- Class: Insecta
- Order: Hemiptera
- Suborder: Auchenorrhyncha
- Family: Cicadellidae
- Subfamily: Deltocephalinae
- Genus: Doratulina; Melichar, 1903

Synonyms
- Malagasiella Evans, 1954

= Doratulina =

Genus of true bugs

Doratulina is a genus of leafhoppers belonging to the family Cicadellidae, subfamily Deltocephalinae, tribe Stenometopiini.
