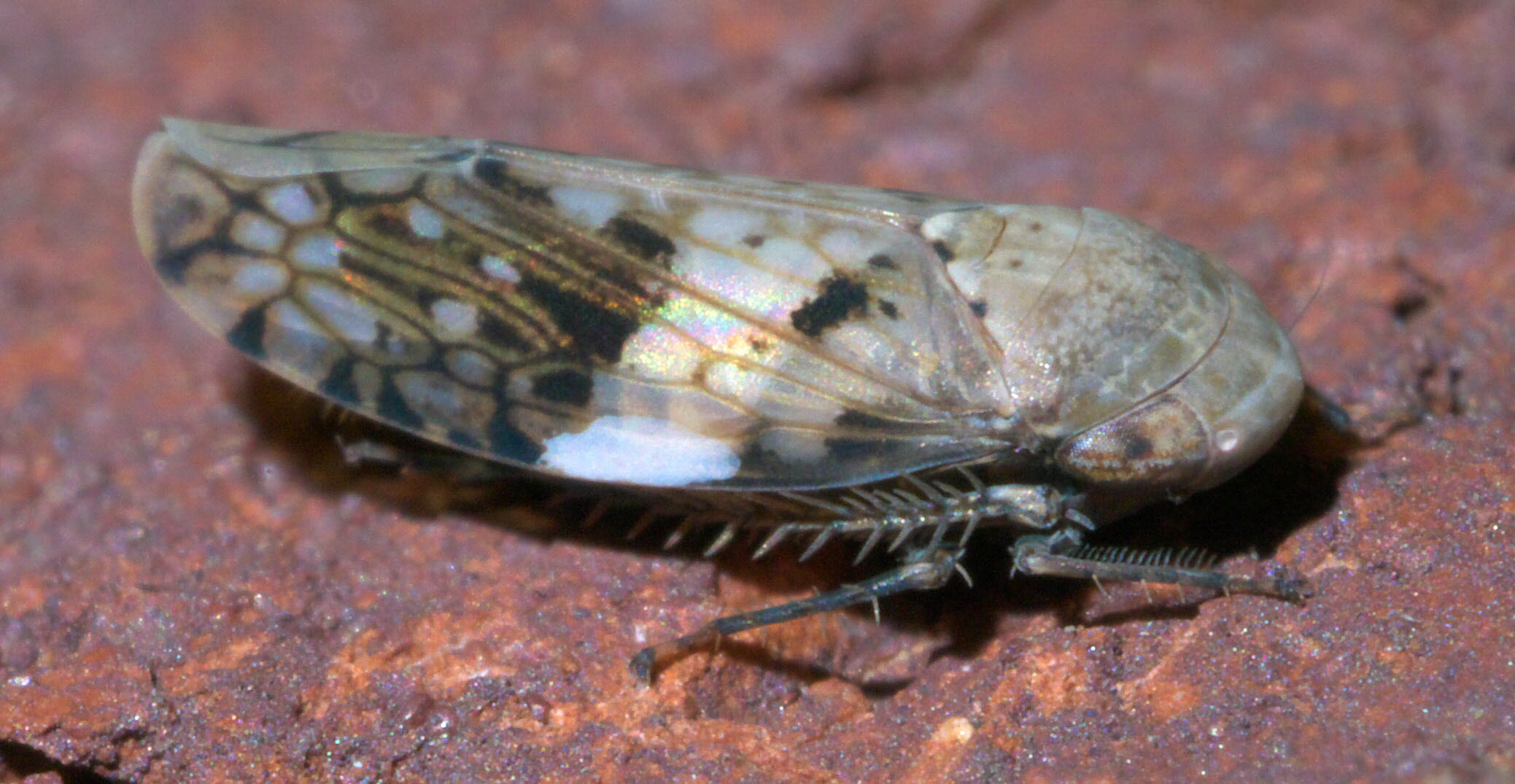
- Menosoma cincta

Scientific classification
- Domain: Eukaryota
- Kingdom: Animalia
- Phylum: Arthropoda
- Class: Insecta
- Order: Hemiptera
- Suborder: Auchenorrhyncha
- Family: Cicadellidae
- Subfamily: Deltocephalinae
- Genus: Menosoma; Ball, 1931

= Menosoma =

Genus of leafhoppers

Menosoma is a genus of leafhoppers in the family Cicadellidae. There are about 12 described species in Menosoma. Menosoma is in the tribe Bahitini within the subfamily Deltocephalinae.

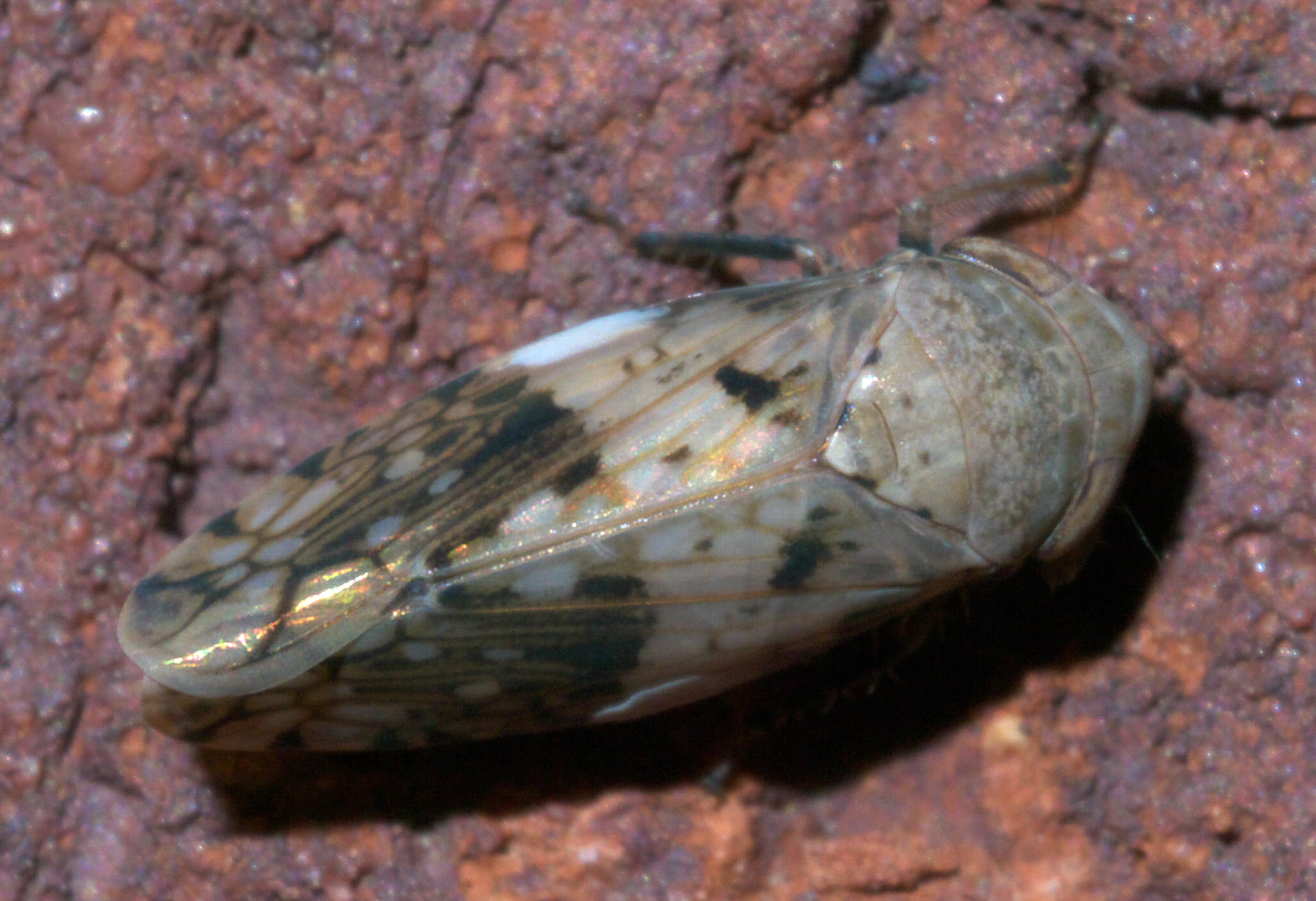
Menosoma cincta

== Species ==
These 12 species belong to the genus Menosoma:

- Menosoma cincta Osborn & Ball, 1898^{c g b}
- Menosoma elegans Osborn 1923^{c g}
- Menosoma flavolineata Linnavuori & DeLong 1978^{c g}
- Menosoma inprica Cheng 1980^{c g}
- Menosoma longita Cheng 1980^{c g}
- Menosoma monticola Linnavuori 1959^{c g}
- Menosoma picta Zanol 1989^{c g}
- Menosoma pseudotaeniata Linnavuori & DeLong 1978^{c g}
- Menosoma randali Zanol 2001^{c g}
- Menosoma stonei Ball 1931^{c g}
- Menosoma taeniata Linnavuori 1955^{c g}
- Menosoma xavantinense Zanol 2001^{c g}

Data sources: i = ITIS, c = Catalogue of Life, g = GBIF, b = Bugguide.net
