= Vulturnus =

Vulturnus may refer to:

- Vulturnus (leafhopper), a genus of leafhoppers in the family Cicadellidae
- Vulturnus (wind), the east wind in Roman mythology
- Volturno, Latin name for this river of southern Italy
- Vespadelus vulturnus, an Australian species of bat
