= Taurotettix elegans =

Scientific classification
- Domain: Eukaryota
- Kingdom: Animalia
- Phylum: Arthropoda
- Class: Insecta
- Order: Hemiptera
- Suborder: Auchenorrhyncha
- Family: Cicadellidae
- Genus: Taurotettix
- Species: T. elegans

Binomial name
- Taurotettix elegans Melichar, 1900

Synonyms
- Callistrophia elegans Melichar, 1900; Taurottettix (Callistrophia) elegans (Melichar)

Species of true bug

Taurotettix elegans is a species of hoppers in the tribe Cicadulini. It is found in Asia (China, Kazakhstan, Kyrgyzstan, Mongolia, Russia, Tajikistan, Turkey, Turkmenistan, Uzbekistan).
