= Acostemmini =

Scientific classification
- Domain: Eukaryota
- Kingdom: Animalia
- Phylum: Arthropoda
- Class: Insecta
- Order: Hemiptera
- Suborder: Auchenorrhyncha
- Family: Cicadellidae
- Subfamily: Deltocephalinae
- Tribe: Acostemmini; Evans, 1972

Genera
- 12, see text.

Synonyms
- Acroponinae Linnavuori & Quartau, 1975

Tribe of insects

Acostemmini is a tribe of leafhoppers in the subfamily Deltocephalinae. Acostemmini contains 12 genera and around 30 species. The tribe is found throughout tropical Africa, the Indian subcontinent and New Guinea. The highest diversity is found in Madagascar including an endemic genus, Ikelibeloha.

== Genera ==
There are currently 12 described genera in the tribe Acostemmini:

- Acostemana Evans, 1954
- Acostemma Signoret, 1860
- Acostemmella Evans, 1954
- Alocoelidia Evans, 1954
- Caelidioides Signoret, 1880
- Dardania Stål, 1866
- Eryapus Evans, 1954
- Ikelibeloha Zahniser & Nielson, 2012
- Iturnoria Evans, 1954
- Malicia Evans, 1954
- Protonesis Spinola, 1850
- Telopetulcus Evans, 1972
