= Acinopterus angulatus =

Scientific classification
- Domain: Eukaryota
- Kingdom: Animalia
- Phylum: Arthropoda
- Class: Insecta
- Order: Hemiptera
- Suborder: Auchenorrhyncha
- Family: Cicadellidae
- Tribe: Acinopterini
- Genus: Acinopterus
- Species: A. angulatus

Binomial name
- Acinopterus angulatus Lawson, 1922

Species of true bug

Acinopterus angulatus, the angulate leafhopper, is a species of leafhopper in the family Cicadellidae.
