= Magnentiini =

Scientific classification
- Domain: Eukaryota
- Kingdom: Animalia
- Phylum: Arthropoda
- Class: Insecta
- Order: Hemiptera
- Suborder: Auchenorrhyncha
- Family: Cicadellidae
- Subfamily: Deltocephalinae
- Tribe: Magnentiini; Linnavuori, 1978

Genera
- Magnentius Singh-Pruthi, 1930; Ndua Linnavuori, 1978

Tribe of leafhoppers

Magnentiini is a tribe of leafhoppers in the subfamily Deltocephalinae. There are currently 2 genera and 4 species in the tribe. It was formerly placed in the subfamily Nioniinae, but was moved to Deltocephalinae based on anatomical similarities. Members of Magnentiini are superficially similar to members of Punctulini and Vartini.

== Genera ==
There are currently two genera in Magnentiini:

- Magnentius Singh-Pruthi, 1930
- Ndua Linnavuori, 1978
