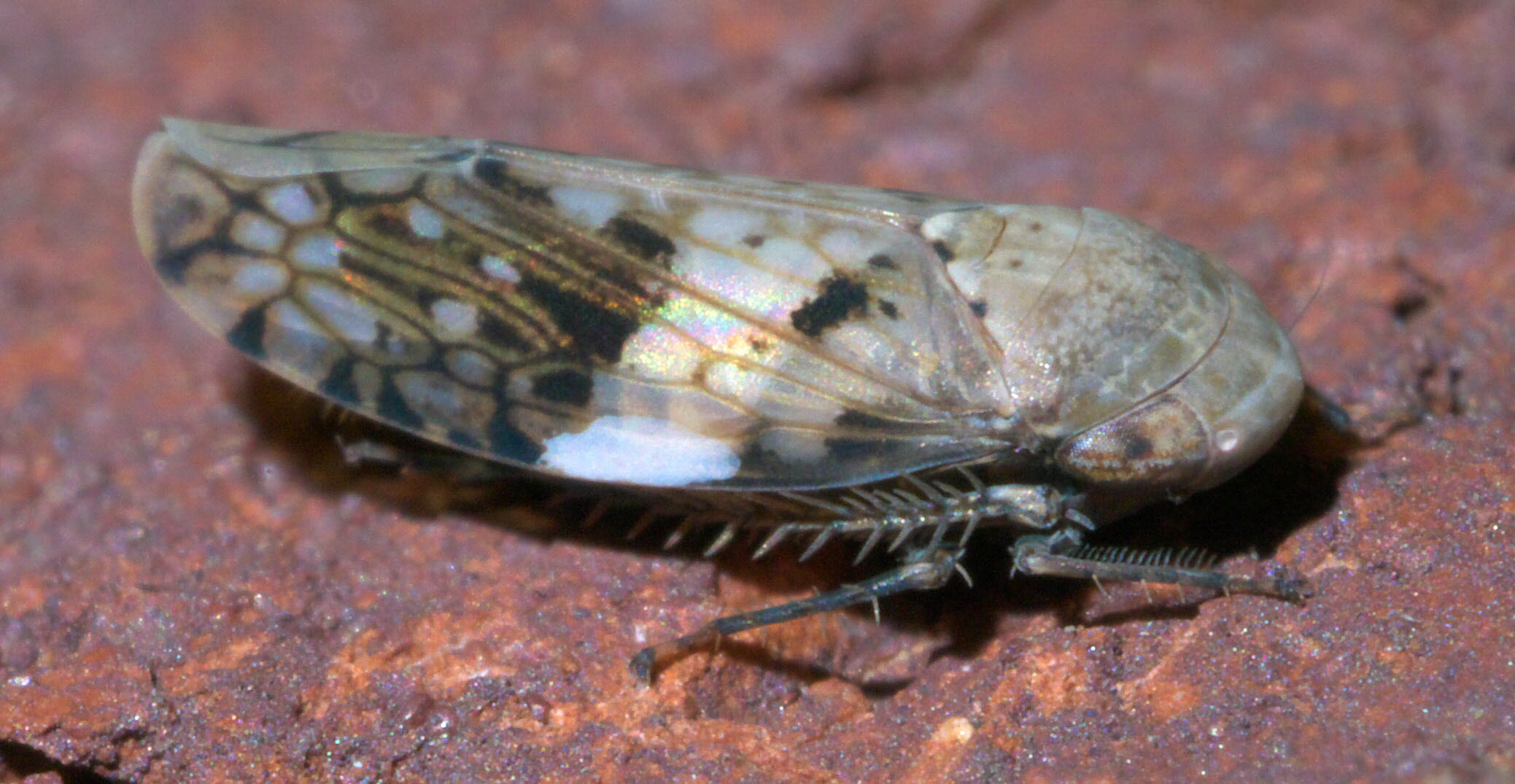

Scientific classification
- Domain: Eukaryota
- Kingdom: Animalia
- Phylum: Arthropoda
- Class: Insecta
- Order: Hemiptera
- Suborder: Auchenorrhyncha
- Family: Cicadellidae
- Genus: Menosoma
- Species: M. cincta

Binomial name
- Menosoma cincta Osborn & Ball, 1898

= Menosoma cincta =

Species of true bug

Menosoma cincta is a species of leafhopper in the family Cicadellidae, found in North, Central, and South America. The species is also referred to as Menosoma cinctum.

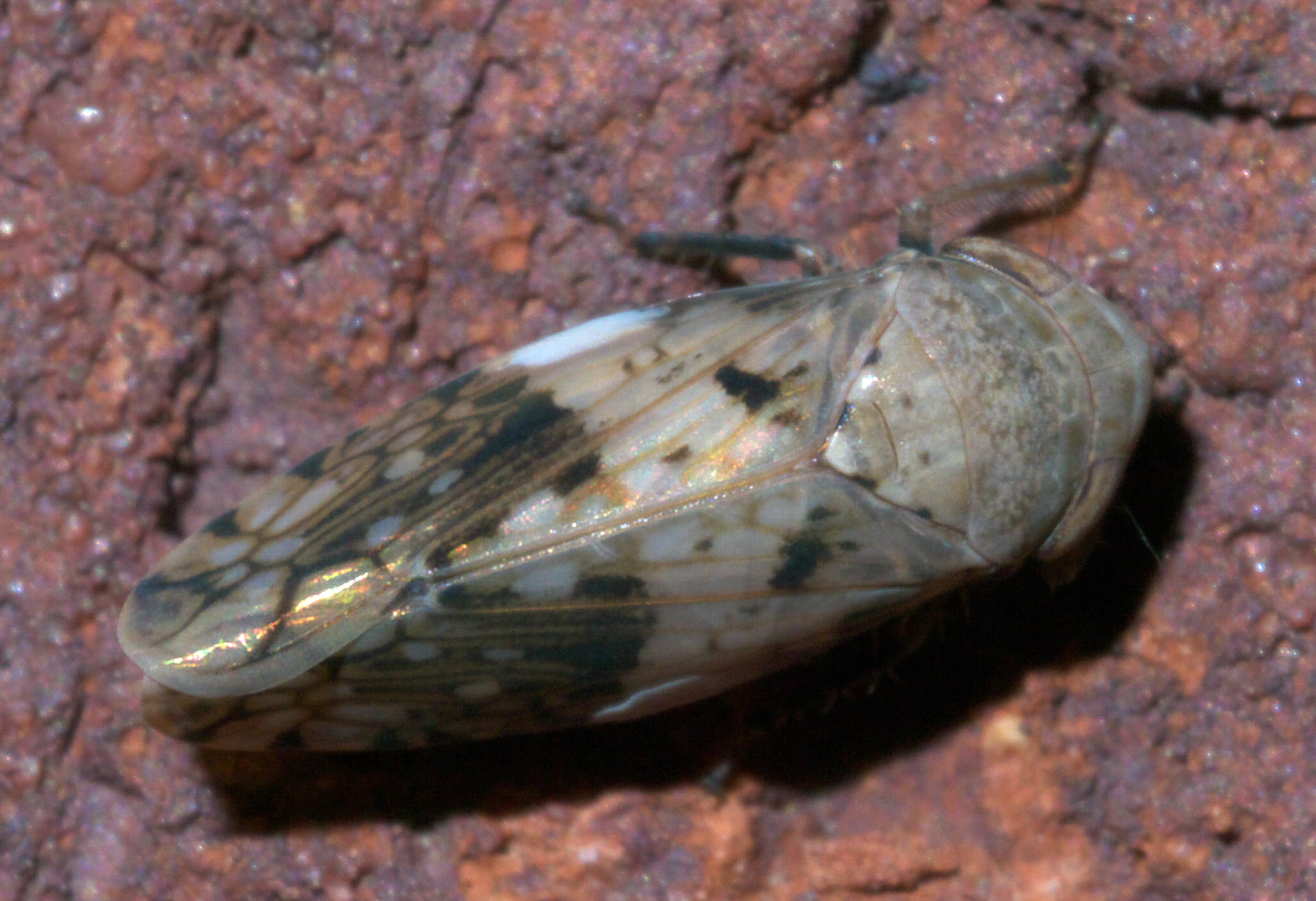

== Subspecies ==
These three subspecies belong to the species Menosoma cincta:

- Menosoma cincta binaria Ball, 1931
- Menosoma cincta cincta
- Menosoma cincta mexicana DeLong, 1945
