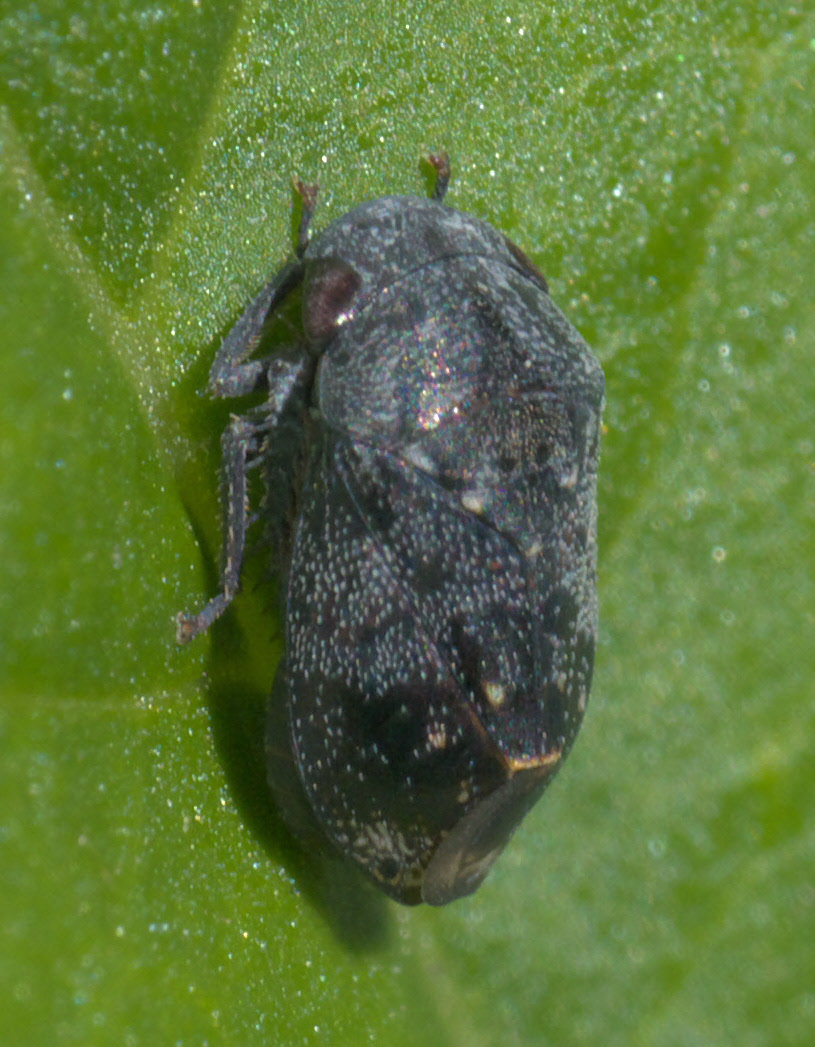

Scientific classification
- Domain: Eukaryota
- Kingdom: Animalia
- Phylum: Arthropoda
- Class: Insecta
- Order: Hemiptera
- Suborder: Auchenorrhyncha
- Family: Cicadellidae
- Genus: Penthimia
- Species: P. americana

Binomial name
- Penthimia americana Fitch, 1851

= Penthimia americana =

Species of true bug

Penthimia americana is a species of leafhopper in the family Cicadellidae.

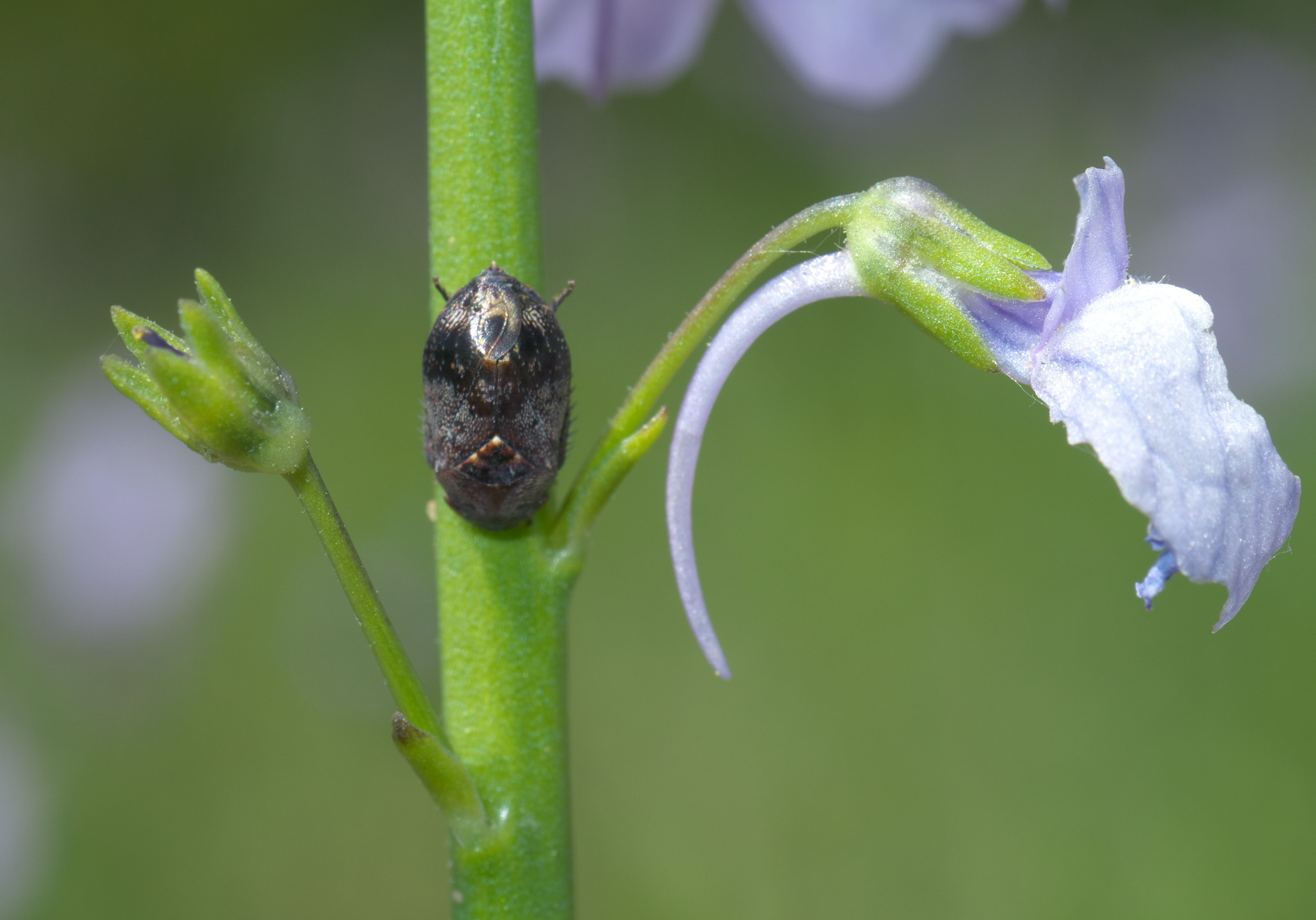
