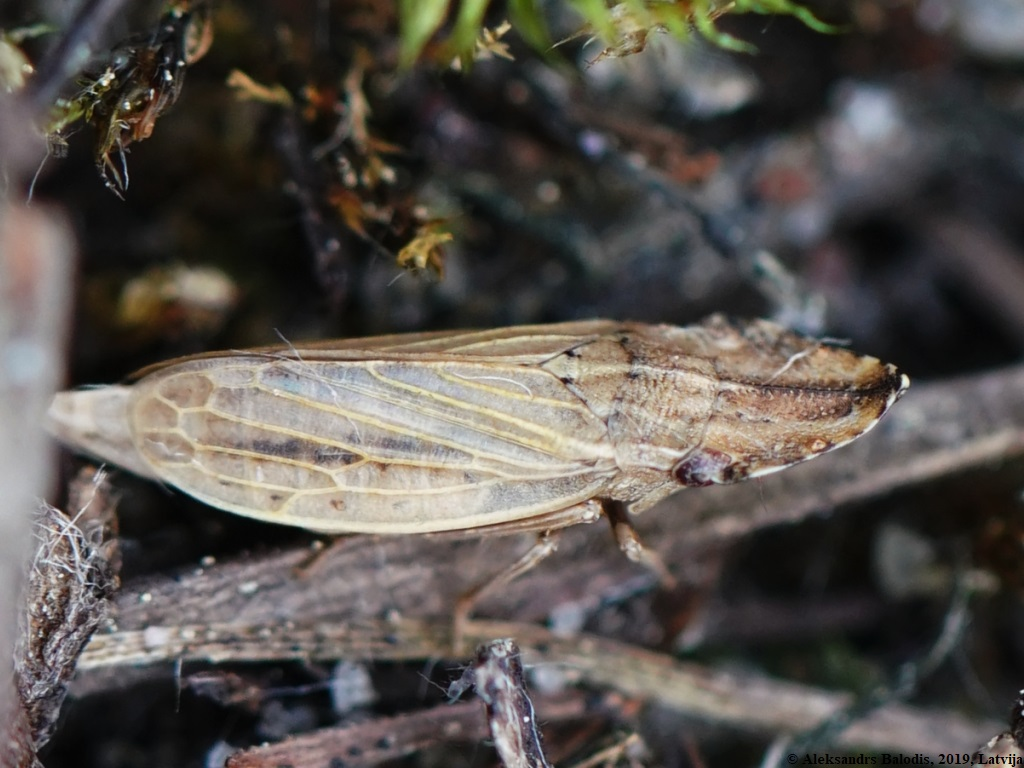
- Eupelix cuspidata

Scientific classification
- Kingdom: Animalia
- Phylum: Arthropoda
- Class: Insecta
- Order: Hemiptera
- Suborder: Auchenorrhyncha
- Family: Cicadellidae
- Subfamily: Deltocephalinae
- Tribe: Eupelicini; Sahlberg, 1871

Subtribes
- 4, see text.

= Eupelicini =

Tribe of true bugs

Eupelicini is a tribe of leafhoppers in the subfamily Deltocephalinae. Eupelicini is divided into four subtribes, containg genera found in Africa, Europe, Asia, Australia and the Pacific.

== Genera ==
There are currently (2025) four subtribes (2 monogeneric):

Subtribe Drakensbergenina Linnavuori, 1979

- Drakensbergena Linnavuori, 1961

Subtribe Eupelicina Sahlberg, 1871

- Eupelix Germar, 1821

Subtribe Paradorydiina Evans, 1936

- Afralycisca Kocak, 1981
- Chloropelix Lindberg, 1936
- Mapochia Distant, 1910
- Mapochiella Evans, 1966
- Paradorydium Kirkaldy, 1901
- Sectoculus Morrison, 1973

Subtribe Stenometopiina Baker, 1923
