= Tetartostylus =

Scientific classification
- Domain: Eukaryota
- Kingdom: Animalia
- Phylum: Arthropoda
- Class: Insecta
- Order: Hemiptera
- Suborder: Auchenorrhyncha
- Family: Cicadellidae
- Subfamily: Deltocephalinae
- Tribe: Tetartostylini; Wagner, 1951
- Genus: Tetartostylus; Wagner, 1951

Species
- 11, see text

Genus of insects

Tetartostylus is a genus of leafhoppers in the subfamily Deltocephalinae. It is the only genus is the monotypic tribe Tetartostylini. Tetartostylini also used to include the genus Hiltus, but Hiltus is now placed in the tribe Paralimnini.

== Species ==
There are currently 11 described species in Tetartostylus:

- Tetartostylus acutus Heller & Linnavuori, 1968
- Tetartostylus angulatus Linnavuori, 1961
- Tetartostylus arcuatus Nast, 1985
- Tetartostylus brevistylus Theron, 1973
- Tetartostylus illyricus Kirschbaum, 1868
- Tetartostylus inflatus Theron, 1973
- Tetartostylus longidentatus Theron, 1973
- Tetartostylus parabolatus Naudé, 1926
- Tetartostylus phaeometopus Theron, 1982
- Tetartostylus pundus Theron, 1973
- Tetartostylus tibialis Nast, 1985
