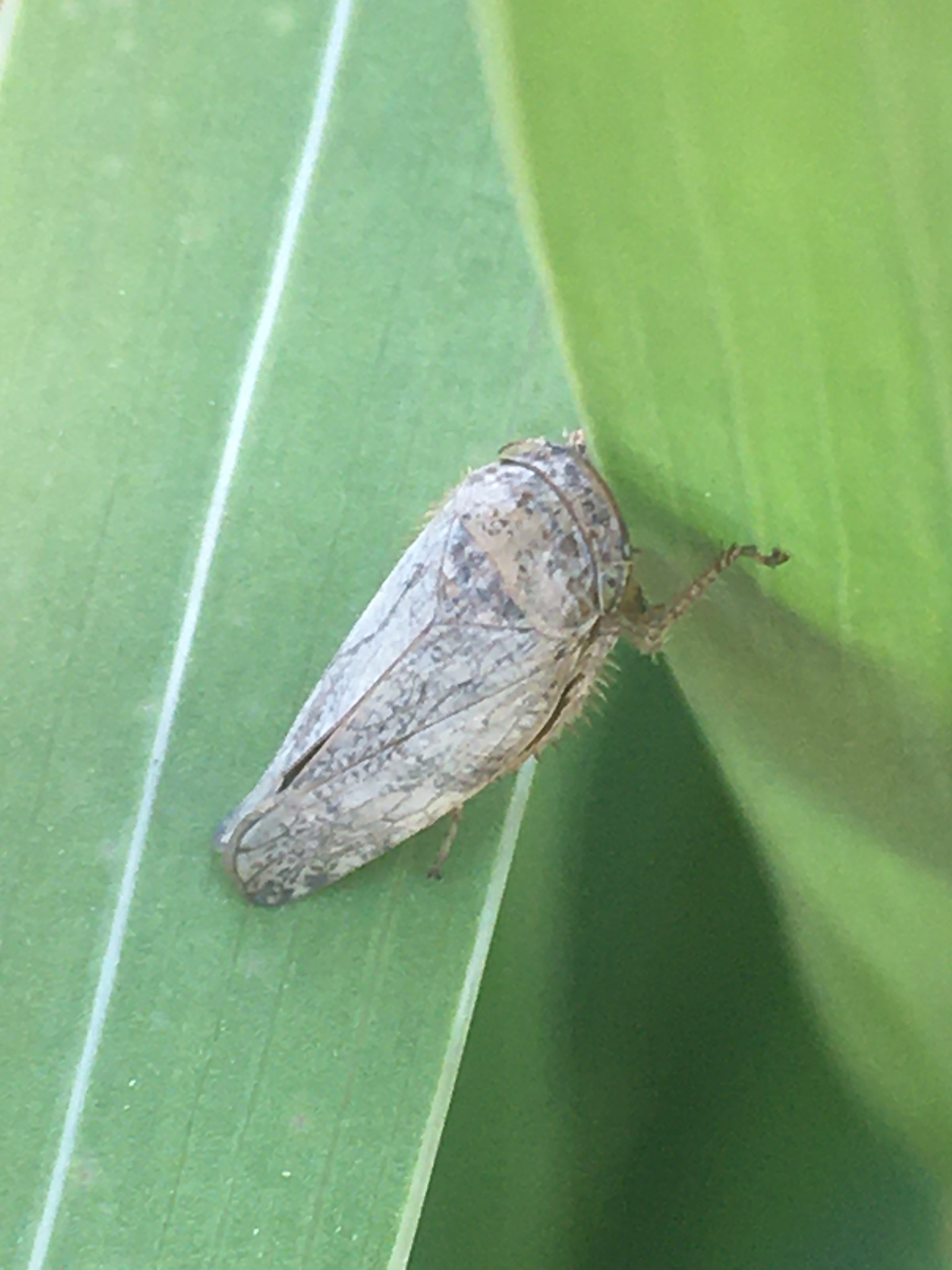
- Selenocephalus sp.

Scientific classification
- Kingdom: Animalia
- Phylum: Arthropoda
- Class: Insecta
- Order: Hemiptera
- Suborder: Auchenorrhyncha
- Family: Cicadellidae
- Subfamily: Deltocephalinae
- Tribe: Selenocephalini; Fieber, 1872

Subtribes
- 6, see text

Synonyms
- Ianeirini Linnavuori, 1978; Adamini Linnavuori & Al-Ne’amy, 1983; Dwightlini Linnavuori & Al-Ne’amy, 1983

= Selenocephalini =

Tribe of true bugs

Selenocephalini is a tribe of leafhoppers in the subfamily Deltocephalinae, divided into six subtribes.

== Subtribes and genera ==
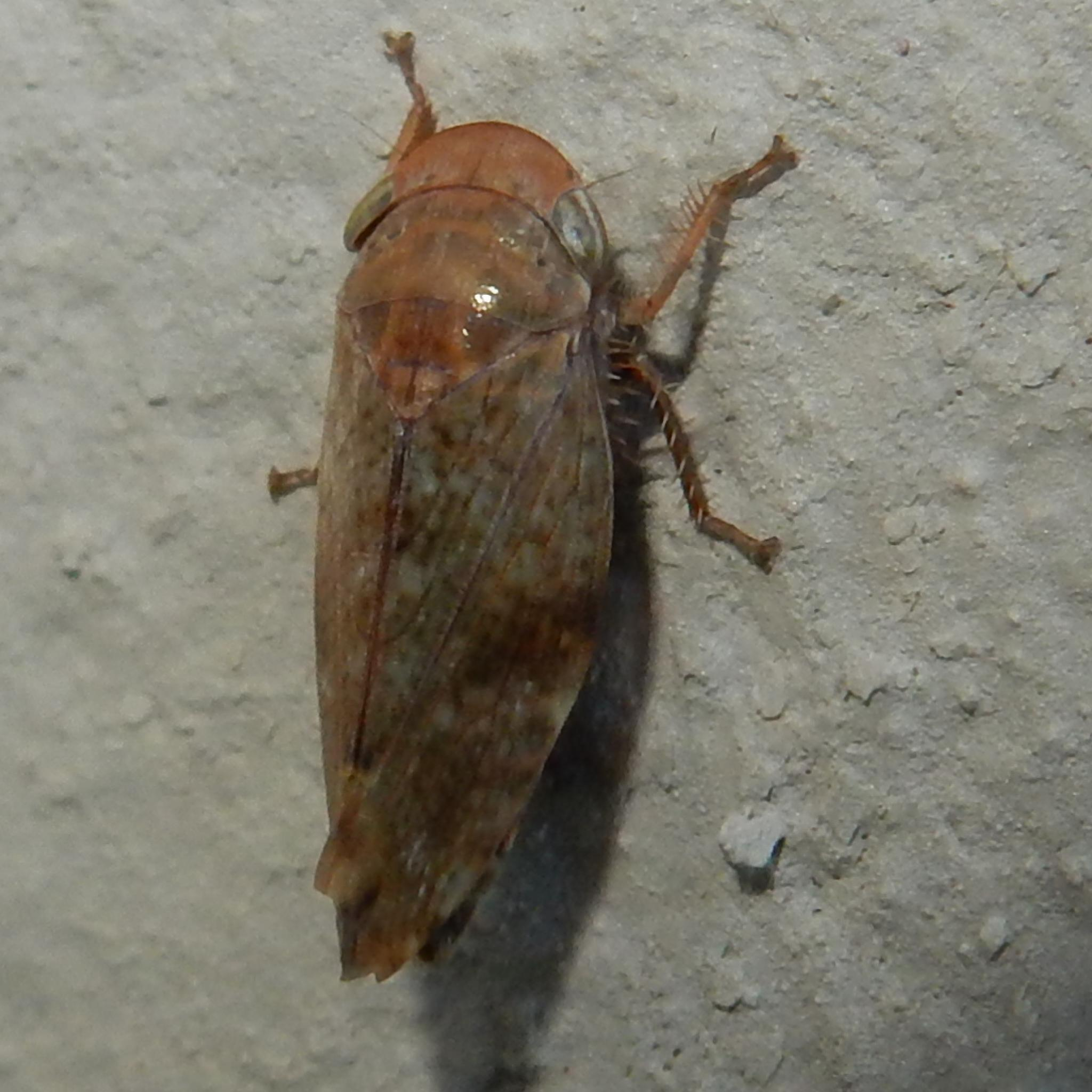
Citorus sp.

There are currently (2025) six subtribes:

Subtribe Adamina Linnavuori & Al-Ne’amy, 1983

- Adama Dlabola, 1980

Subtribe Bonaspeiina Zahniser & Dietrich, 2013

- Bonaspeia Linnavuori, 1961

Subtribe Dwightlina McKamey, 2003

- Dwightla McKamey, 2003

Subtribe Hypacostemmina Linnavuori & Al-Ne’amy, 1983

- Hypacostemma Linnavuori, 1961

Subtribe Ianeirina Linnavuori, 1978

- Abimwa Linnavuori, 1978
- Bardera Linnavuori & Al-Ne’amy, 1983
- Ianeira Linnavuori, 1969
- Kanziko Linnavuori & Al-Ne’amy, 1983

Subtribe Selenocephalina Fieber, 1872

- Angolaia Linnavuori & Al-Ne’amy, 1983
- Bumka McKamey, 2003
- Citorus Stål, 1866
- Distantia Signoret, 1879
- Foso Linnavuori & Al-Ne’amy, 1983
- Gannia Theron, 1979
- Hecaloidella Osborn, 1934
- Ifeia Linnavuori & Al-Ne’amy, 1983
- Loka Linnavuori & Al-Ne’amy, 1983
- Maichewia Linnavuori & Al-Ne’amy, 1983
- Malendea Linnavuori & Al-Ne’amy, 1983
- Moluccazhangia McKamey, 2003
- Omanellinus Zhang, 1999
- Sapoba Linnavuori & Al-Ne’amy, 1983
- Selenocephalus Germar, 1833
