= Dorycephalus =

Scientific classification
- Kingdom: Animalia
- Phylum: Arthropoda
- Clade: Pancrustacea
- Class: Insecta
- Order: Hemiptera
- Suborder: Auchenorrhyncha
- Family: Cicadellidae
- Subfamily: Deltocephalinae
- Tribe: Dorycephalini; Oman, 1943
- Genus: Dorycephalus; Kouchakewitch, 1866

Species
- 2, see text

Genus of insects

Dorycephalus is a genus of leafhoppers in the subfamily Deltocephalinae. It is the only genus in the tribe Dorycephalini. There are currently only two described species in the genus. The members of the genus are found in eastern Europe, Russia and Mongolia.

== Species ==
There are currently 2 described species in Dorycephalus:

- Dorycephalus baeri Kouchakewitch, 1866
- Dorycephalus hunnorum Emeljanov, 1964
