= Faltalini =

Scientific classification
- Domain: Eukaryota
- Kingdom: Animalia
- Phylum: Arthropoda
- Class: Insecta
- Order: Hemiptera
- Suborder: Auchenorrhyncha
- Family: Cicadellidae
- Subfamily: Deltocephalinae
- Tribe: Faltalini; Zahniser & Dietrich, 2010

Genera
- 11, see text.

Tribe of true bugs

Faltalini is a tribe of leafhoppers in the subfamily Deltocephalinae. Faltalini is distributed from the southwestern United States south to Argentina and Chile. It contains 11 genera and over 25 species.

== Genera ==
There are currently 11 described genera in Faltalini:

- Ackbaria Campodonico & Zahniser, 2017
- Acrolithus Freytag & Ma, 1988
- Aequecephalus DeLong & Thambimuttu, 1973
- Bonamus Oman, 1938
- Clorindaia Linnavuori, 1975
- Faltala Oman, 1938
- Hecalocorica Nielson, 1996
- Hecullus Oman, 1949
- Kramerana DeLong & Thambimuttu, 1973
- Tenucephalus DeLong, 1944
- Virganana DeLong & Thambimuttu, 1973
