= Drakensbergena =

Scientific classification
- Kingdom: Animalia
- Phylum: Arthropoda
- Class: Insecta
- Order: Hemiptera
- Suborder: Auchenorrhyncha
- Family: Cicadellidae
- Tribe: Eupelicini
- Subtribe: Drakensbergena; Linnavuori, 1979
- Genus: Drakensbergena; Linnavuori, 1961

Type species
- Drakensbergena fuscovittata Linnavuori, 1961

Species
- 18, see text

Genus of true bugs

Drakensbergena is a genus of leafhoppers in the monogeneric subtribe Drakensbergenina of the subfamily Deltocephalinae. There are currently 18 described species all found in the grasslands and fynbos of South Africa and Lesotho.

== Species ==
There are currently 18 described species in Drakensbergena:

- Drakensbergena armstrongi Stiller, 2009
- Drakensbergena austrina Stiller, 2009
- Drakensbergena bisulca Stiller, 2009
- Drakensbergena breviata Stiller, 2009
- Drakensbergena cuneifer Stiller, 2009
- Drakensbergena deorsuspina Stiller, 2009
- Drakensbergena festucacola Stiller, 2009
- Drakensbergena fuscovittata Linnavuori, 1961
- Drakensbergena gigascutica Stiller, 2009
- Drakensbergena labeona Stiller, 2009
- Drakensbergena lobulata Stiller, 2009
- Drakensbergena longinqua Stiller, 2009
- Drakensbergena ochracea Linnavuori, 1979
- Drakensbergena phaeogramma Stiller, 2009
- Drakensbergena prolixa Stiller, 2009
- Drakensbergena retrospina Stiller, 2009
- Drakensbergena simulata Stiller, 2009
- Drakensbergena spinula Stiller, 2009
