= Arrugada =

Scientific classification
- Domain: Eukaryota
- Kingdom: Animalia
- Phylum: Arthropoda
- Class: Insecta
- Order: Hemiptera
- Suborder: Auchenorrhyncha
- Family: Cicadellidae
- Subfamily: Deltocephalinae
- Tribe: Arrugadini; Linnavuori, 1965
- Genus: Arrugada; Oman, 1938

Type species
- Huleria rugosa Osborn, 1924

Species
- 4, see text

Genus of insects

Arrugada is a genus of leafhoppers in the subfamily Deltocephalinae. There are currently four described species of Arrugada and they are all endemic to Bolivia and Peru. The genus was formerly considered to be within its own separate subfamily within Cicadellidae; however, it is now recognized to be in its own tribe, Arrugadini, within the subfamily Deltocephalinae.

== Species ==
There are 4 described species of Arrugada:

- Arrugada affinis (Osborn, 1924)
- Arrugada breviceps Linnavuori & DeLong, 1978
- Arrugada linnavuorii Zahniser & Dietrich, 2013
- Arrugada rugosa (Osborn, 1924)
