= Mukariini =

Scientific classification
- Domain: Eukaryota
- Kingdom: Animalia
- Phylum: Arthropoda
- Class: Insecta
- Order: Hemiptera
- Suborder: Auchenorrhyncha
- Family: Cicadellidae
- Subfamily: Deltocephalinae
- Tribe: Mukariini; Distant, 1908

Tribe of true bugs

Mukariini is a tribe of leafhoppers in the subfamily Deltocephalinae.

== Taxonomy ==
Mukariini has been considered to be a member of the subfamily Nirvaninae or in its own subfamily Mukariinae, but more recent molecular and morphological data has placed Mukariini in the subfamily Deltocephalinae.

== Genera ==
There are 17 genera in the tribe Mukariini:

- Aalinga Viraktamath & Webb, 2019
- Agrica Strand, 1942
- Bambusimukaria Yong, Chen & Li, 2016
- Buloria Distant, 1908
- Crispina Distant, 1918
- Flatfronta Chen & Li, 1997
- Mohunia Distant, 1908
- Mukaria Distant, 1908
- Mukariella Viraktamath & Webb, 2019
- Myitanna Distant, 1908
- Neobassareus Koçak, 1981
- Neomohunia Chen & Li, 2007
- Paramohunia Chen & Li, 2007
- Pseudobalbillus Jacobi, 1912
- Pseudomohunia Li, Chen & Zhang, 2007
- Scaphotettix Matsumura, 1914
- Tiaobeinia Chen & Li, 2008
