= Occinirvana =

Scientific classification
- Kingdom: Animalia
- Phylum: Arthropoda
- Class: Insecta
- Order: Hemiptera
- Suborder: Auchenorrhyncha
- Family: Cicadellidae
- Tribe: Occinirvanini; Evans, 1966
- Genus: Occinirvana; Evans, 1941
- Species: O. eborea

Binomial name
- Occinirvana eborea Evans, 1941

Species of true bug

Occinirvana is a genus of leafhoppers in the subfamily Deltocephalinae. It contains the only species Occinirvana eborea, and is the only member of the tribe Occinirvanini. O. eborea is endemic to Western Australia. It is closely related to Loralia, another genus of leafhoppers endemic to Australia.

== Description ==
Occinirvana eborea is an ivory and orange colored medium leafhopper. It is easily identifiable by its unique head shape with long antennae sprouting out high up on its head. Not much is known about the species' ecology, but it has been found on trees in the genus Casuarina.
