= Goniagnathini =

Scientific classification
- Domain: Eukaryota
- Kingdom: Animalia
- Phylum: Arthropoda
- Class: Insecta
- Order: Hemiptera
- Suborder: Auchenorrhyncha
- Family: Cicadellidae
- Subfamily: Deltocephalinae
- Tribe: Goniagnathini; Wagner, 1951

Genera
- 4, see text

Tribe of insects

Goniagnathini is a tribe of leafhoppers in the subfamily Deltocephalinae. Goniagnathini contains 4 genera and around 60 species. Of these, one new species, Goniagnathus cornutus was recently verified in China.

== Genera ==
There are currently four described genera in Goniagnathini:

- Goniagnathus Fieber, 1866
- Megalopsius Emeljanov, 1961
- Raunothus Dlabola, 1987
- Tamaricades Emeljanov, 1962
