= Stegelytrini =

Scientific classification
- Kingdom: Animalia
- Phylum: Arthropoda
- Class: Insecta
- Order: Hemiptera
- Suborder: Auchenorrhyncha
- Family: Cicadellidae
- Subfamily: Deltocephalinae
- Tribe: Stegelytrini; Baker, 1915

Genera
- 300, see text

Tribe of insects

Stegelytrini is a tribe of leafhoppers in the subfamily Deltocephalinae. There are 30 genera and over 80 species in Stegelytrini. Some authors consider Stegelytrini to be its own subfamily, but Zahniser & Dietrich (2013) consider it to be the earliest divergent lineage of Deltocephalinae.

== Genera ==
There are currently 30 described genera in Stegelytrini:

- Aculescutellaris Zhang, Wei & Webb, 2007
- Cyrta Melichar, 1902
- Daochia Wei, Zhang & Webb, 2006
- Doda Distant, 1908
- Honguchia Wei & Webb, 2010
- Kasinella Evans, 1971
- Kunasia Distant, 1908
- Louangana Wei & Webb, 2010
- Minucella Wei, Zhang & Webb, 2008
- Neophansia Wei & Webb, 2010
- Pachymetopius Matsumura, 1914
- Paracyrta Wei, Webb & Zhang, 2008
- Paradoxivena Wei, Zhang &Webb, 2006
- Paraplacidellus Zhang, Wei & Shen, 2002
- Paratoba Wei, Webb & Zhang, 2007
- Pataniolidia Wei, Webb & Zhang, 2007
- Placidellus Evans, 1971
- Platyvalvata Zhang, Wei & Webb, 2006
- Pseudododa Zhang, Wei & Webb, 2007
- Quiontugia Wei & Zhang, 2010
- Shangonia Wei & Webb, 2010
- Stegelytra Mulsant & Rey, 1855
- Stenolora Zhang, Wei & Webb, 2006
- Sychentia Wei & Webb, 2010
- Temburocera Webb, 1999
- Toba Schmidt, 1911
- Trunchinus Zhang, Webb & Wei, 2007
- Wadkufia Linnavuori, 1965
- Wyuchiva Zhang, Wei & Webb, 2006
- Yaontogonia Wei & Webb, 2010
