= Bahitini =

Scientific classification
- Domain: Eukaryota
- Kingdom: Animalia
- Phylum: Arthropoda
- Class: Insecta
- Order: Hemiptera
- Suborder: Auchenorrhyncha
- Family: Cicadellidae
- Subfamily: Deltocephalinae
- Tribe: Bahitini; Zahniser & Dietrich, 2013

Tribe of true bugs

Bahitini is a tribe of leafhoppers in the subfamily Deltocephalinae. Bahitini contains 25 genera and over 165 species.

== Genera ==
There are 25 described genera in the tribe Bahitini:

- Bahita Oman, 1938
- Brincadorus Oman, 1938
- Caruya Linnavuori & DeLong, 1978
- Chonosina Linnavuori & DeLong, 1978
- Concepciona Linnavuori & DeLong, 1977
- Frequenamia DeLong, 1947
- Hecaloidia Osborn, 1923
- Huachia Linnavuori, 1959
- Ilagia Kramer & DeLong, 1968
- Kinrentius Wei, Dietrich & Webb, 2010
- Kyra Zanol, 2011
- Megabahita Linnavuori & DeLong, 1978
- Menosoma Ball, 1931
- Oxycephalotettix Zahniser, 2005
- Parabahita Linnavuori, 1959
- Perubahita Linnavuori & DeLong, 1978
- Rineda Linnavuori & DeLong, 1978
- Saadevra McKamey, 2003
- Sanestebania Linnavuori & DeLong, 1978
- Serridonus Linnavuori, 1959
- Sinchonoa Linnavuori & DeLong, 1978
- Suarezilinna McKamey, 2003
- Taperinha Linnavuori, 1959
- Tingopyx Linnavuori & DeLong, 1978
- Yuraca Linnavuori & DeLong, 1978
