= Hypacostemma =

Scientific classification
- Kingdom: Animalia
- Phylum: Arthropoda
- Class: Insecta
- Order: Hemiptera
- Suborder: Auchenorrhyncha
- Family: Cicadellidae
- Tribe: Selenocephalini
- Subtribe: Hypacostemmina; Linnavuori & Al-Ne'amy, 1983
- Genus: Hypacostemma; Linnavuori, 1961

Type species
- Hypacostemma uniformis Distant, 1910

Species
- 4, see text

Genus of insects

Hypacostemma is a genus of leafhoppers in the subfamily Deltocephalinae. It is the only genus in the subtribe Hypacostemmina. Hypacostemma species are distributed throughout Southern Africa. Hypacostemma are usually large greenish leafhoppers with a length between 7-10 mm.

== Species ==
The following described species are in Hypacostemma:

1. Hypacostemma brevis Theron, 1987
2. Hypacostemma devia Theron, 1987
3. Hypacostemma falcata Theron, 1987
4. Hypacostemma uniformis (Distant, 1910) - type species (as Hypacostemma viridissima Linnavuori, 1961)
