= Punctulina =

Scientific classification
- Kingdom: Animalia
- Phylum: Arthropoda
- Class: Insecta
- Order: Hemiptera
- Suborder: Auchenorrhyncha
- Family: Cicadellidae
- Tribe: Vartini
- Subtribe: Punctulina; Dai, Zahniser, Viraktamath & Webb, 2017

Genera
- see text

Tribe of true bugs

Punctulina is a subtribe of Asian leafhoppers in the tribe Vartini and subfamily Deltocephalinae. Punctulini is also related to Magnentiini.

== Genera ==
The World Auchenorrhyncha Database includes:

1. Bambuphaga Ramaiah, Meshram & Dey, 2023
2. Hirsutula Dai, Zahniser, Viraktamath & Webb, 2017
3. Hochiminhus Dietrich, Nguyen & Pham, 2020
4. Loeia Duan, 2017
5. Pseudocestius Dietrich, Nguyen & Pham, 2020
6. Punctulus Dai, Zahniser, Viraktamath & Webb, 2017
7. Taveunius Dai, Zahniser, Viraktamath & Webb, 2017
