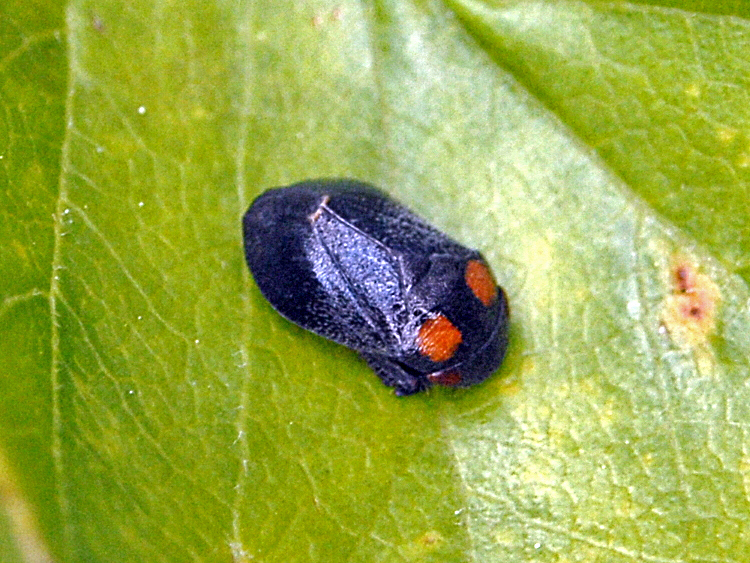
- Penthimia nigra

Scientific classification
- Domain: Eukaryota
- Kingdom: Animalia
- Phylum: Arthropoda
- Class: Insecta
- Order: Hemiptera
- Suborder: Auchenorrhyncha
- Family: Cicadellidae
- Subfamily: Deltocephalinae
- Genus: Penthimia; Germar 1821

= Penthimia =

Genus of true bugs

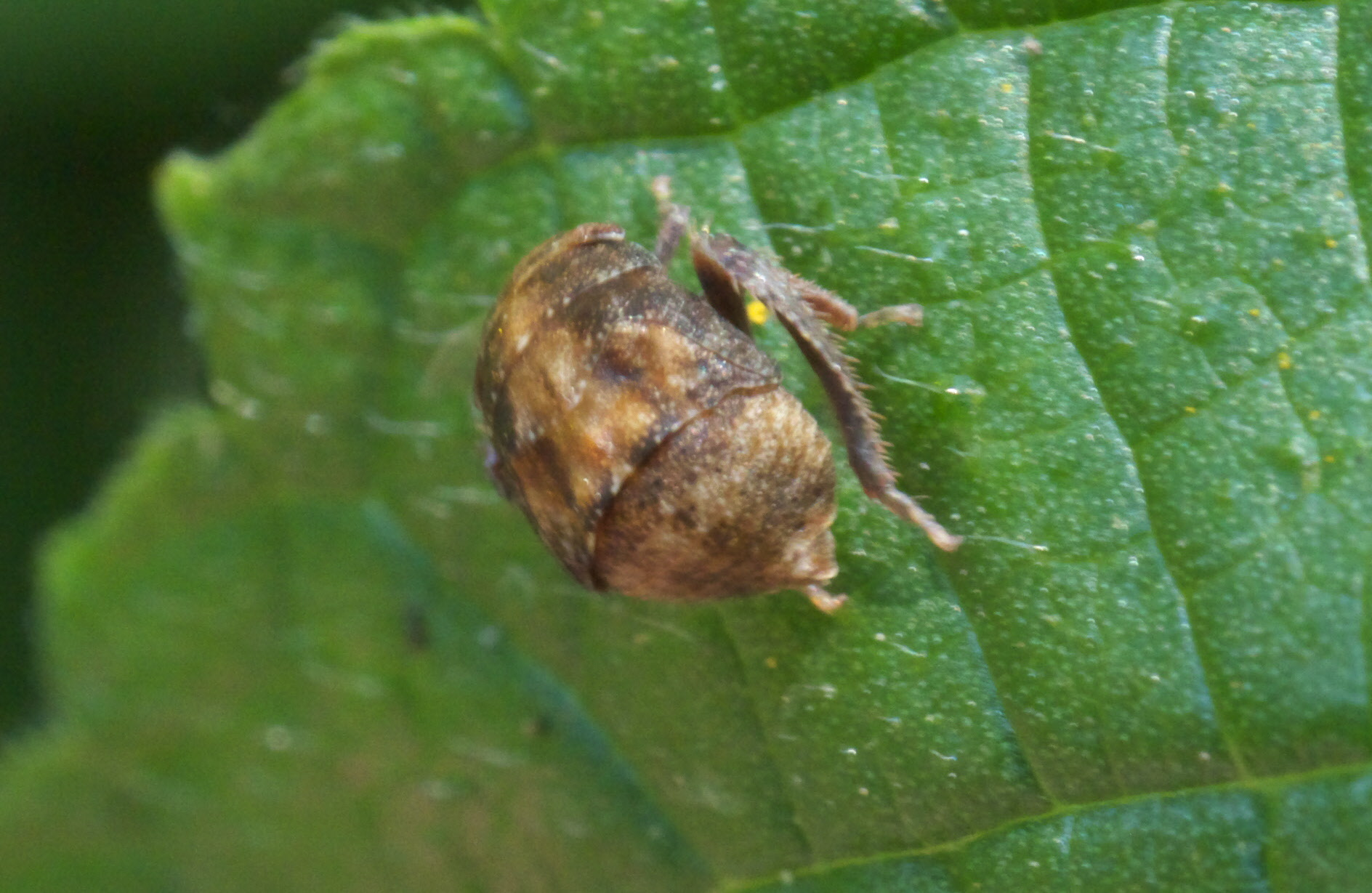

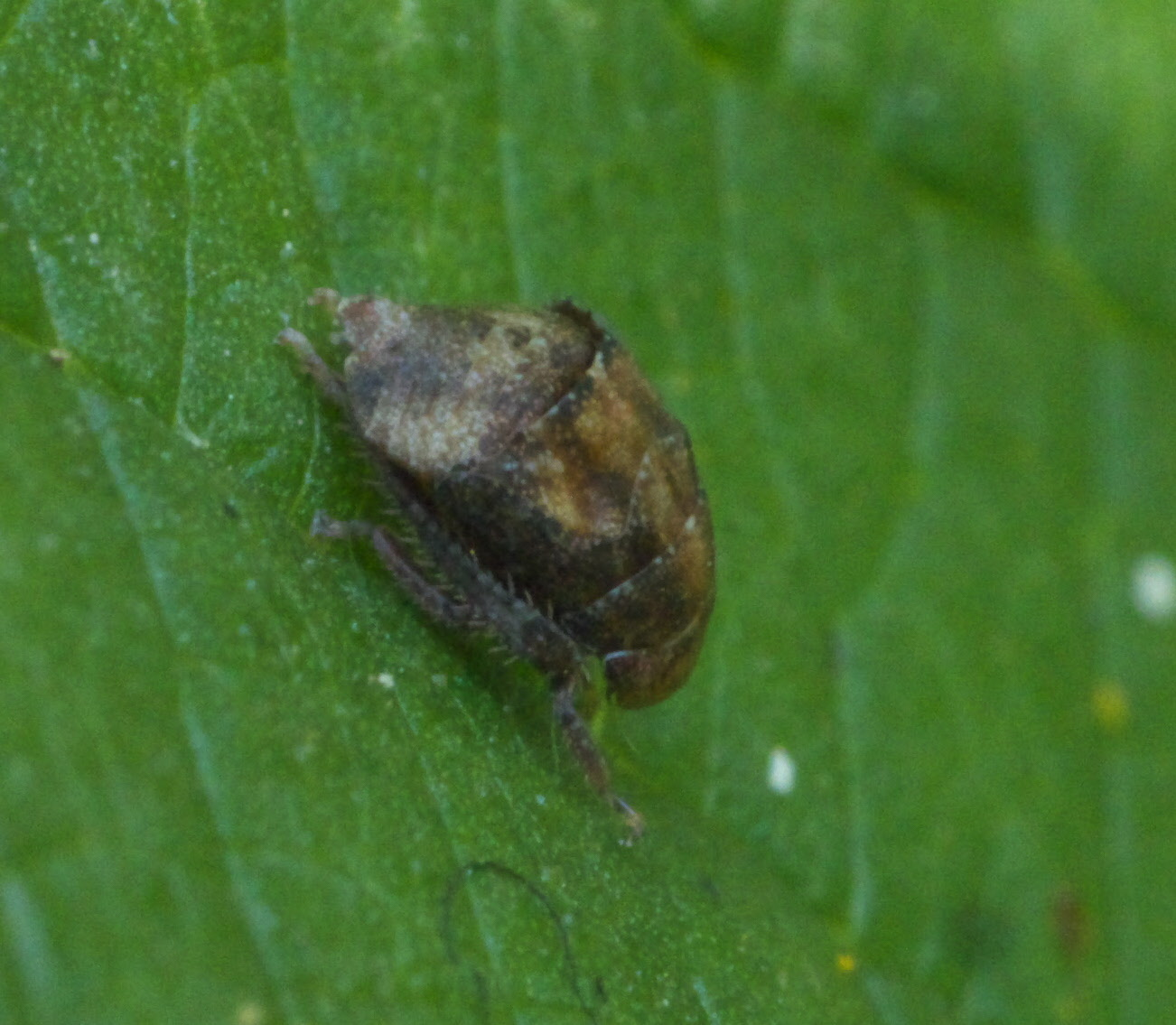

Penthimia is a genus of leafhoppers belonging to the family Cicadellidae subfamily Deltocephalinae.

== Species ==
These 97 species belong to the genus Penthimia:

- Penthimia albiguttula Stål 1870^{c g}
- Penthimia albipennis Linnavuori 1977^{c g}
- Penthimia alboguttata Kuoh^{c g}
- Penthimia americana Fitch, 1851^{c g b}
- Penthimia apicata Bierman 1910^{c g}
- Penthimia arcuata Cai & Shen 1998^{c g}
- Penthimia aridula Linnavuori 1977^{c g}
- Penthimia atomaria Walker 1870^{c g}
- Penthimia attenuata Distant 1918^{c g}
- Penthimia badia Distant 1918^{c g}
- Penthimia bos Linnavuori 1977^{c g}
- Penthimia caliginosa Walker 1870^{c g}
- Penthimia castanaica Jacobi 1944^{c g}
- Penthimia citrina Wang^{c g}
- Penthimia compacta Walker 1851^{c g}
- Penthimia curvata Shobharani, Viraktamath & Webb, 2018^{g}
- Penthimia densa Kuoh^{c g}
- Penthimia distanti Baker 1924^{c g}
- Penthimia dorsimaculata Kwon & Lee 1978^{c g}
- Penthimia erebus Distant 1908^{c g}
- Penthimia escalerae Distant 1910^{c g}
- Penthimia euterpe Linnavuori 1977^{c g}
- Penthimia flavinotum Matsumura 1912^{c g}
- Penthimia flavitarsis Melichar 1914^{c g}
- Penthimia flavocapitata Distant 1918^{c g}
- Penthimia floridana Lawson, 1933^{c g b}
- Penthimia formosa Yang, C.^{c g}
- Penthimia formosana Matsumura 1912^{c g}
- Penthimia fraterna Distant 1918^{c g}
- Penthimia fulviguttata Cheng & Li 2003^{c g}
- Penthimia fumosa Kuoh^{c g}
- Penthimia funebris Distant 1918^{c g}
- Penthimia funerea Linnavuori 1977^{c g}
- Penthimia fuscomaculosa Kwon & Lee 1978^{c g}
- Penthimia guttula Matsumura 1912^{c g}
- Penthimia hemifuscata Merino 1936^{c g}
- Penthimia iris Bierman 1910^{c g}
- Penthimia irrorata Horváth 1909^{c g}
- Penthimia juno Distant 1908^{c g}
- Penthimia laetifica Dlabola 1958^{c g}
- Penthimia laevicollis Linnavuori 1977^{c g}
- Penthimia lenkoranea Dlabola 1961^{c g}
- Penthimia likimica Linnavuori 1977^{c g}
- Penthimia lurida Walker 1870^{c g}
- Penthimia maculipennis Spinola 1852^{c g}
- Penthimia maculosa Shobharani, Viraktamath & Webb, 2018^{g}
- Penthimia majuscula Distant 1918^{c g}
- Penthimia maolanensis Cheng & Li 2003^{c g}
- Penthimia meghalayensis Shobharani, Viraktamath & Webb, 2018^{g}
- Penthimia melanocephala Motschulsky 1863^{c g}
- Penthimia minuta Linnavuori 1977^{c g}
- Penthimia montana Distant 1918^{c g}
- Penthimia mudonensis Distant 1912^{c g}
- Penthimia nana Kusnezov 1931^{c g}
- Penthimia neoattenuata Shobharani, Viraktamath & Webb, 2018^{g}
- Penthimia nigella Linnavuori 1977^{c g}
- Penthimia nigerrima Jacobi 1944^{c g}
- Penthimia nigra Goeze 1778^{c g}
- Penthimia nigropicea Motschulsky 1863^{c g}
- Penthimia nigroscutellata Cai & Shen 1998^{c g}
- Penthimia nilgiriensis Distant 1918^{c g}
- Penthimia nitens Linnavuori 1977^{c g}
- Penthimia nitida Lethierry 1876^{c g}
- Penthimia noctua Distant 1918^{c g}
- Penthimia okinawana Hayashi & Machida 1996^{c g}
- Penthimia persephone Linnavuori 1977^{c g}
- Penthimia picta^{b}
- Penthimia pluto Linnavuori 1977^{c g}
- Penthimia proxima Logvinenko 1983^{c g}
- Penthimia puncticollis Linnavuori 1977^{c g}
- Penthimia quadrinotata Distant 1918^{c g}
- Penthimia raniformis Walker 1870^{c g}
- Penthimia rawasi Bierman 1910^{c g}
- Penthimia rhadamantha Linnavuori 1977^{c g}
- Penthimia ribhoi Shobharani, Viraktamath & Webb, 2018^{g}
- Penthimia rubramaculata Kuoh^{c g}
- Penthimia rubrostriata Kuoh^{c g}
- Penthimia rufopunctata^{g}
- Penthimia sahyadrica Shobharani, Viraktamath & Webb, 2018^{g}
- Penthimia scapularis Distant 1908^{c g}
- Penthimia scutellata Melichar 1902^{c g}
- Penthimia sincipitalis Hayashi & Machida 1996^{c g}
- Penthimia spiculata Shobharani, Viraktamath & Webb, 2018^{g}
- Penthimia subniger Distant 1908^{c g}
- Penthimia testacea Kuoh 1991^{c g}
- Penthimia testudinea Evans 1955^{c g}
- Penthimia theae Matsumura, 1912^{g}
- Penthimia trimaculata Motschulsky 1863^{c g}
- Penthimia tumida Shobharani, Viraktamath & Webb, 2018^{g}
- Penthimia undata Cai & Shen 1998^{c g}
- Penthimia variabilis Distant 1918^{c g}
- Penthimia variolosa Walker 1870^{c g}
- Penthimia vicaria^{b}
- Penthimia vinula^{c g}
- Penthimia vittatifrons Distant 1918^{c g}
- Penthimia yunnana Kuoh^{c g}
- Penthimia zampa Distant 1910^{c g}

Data sources: i = ITIS, c = Catalogue of Life, g = GBIF, b = Bugguide.net
