= Luheria =

Scientific classification
- Domain: Eukaryota
- Kingdom: Animalia
- Phylum: Arthropoda
- Class: Insecta
- Order: Hemiptera
- Suborder: Auchenorrhyncha
- Family: Cicadellidae
- Subfamily: Deltocephalinae
- Tribe: Luheriini; Linnavuori, 1959
- Genus: Luheria; Osborn, 1923
- Species: L. constricta

Binomial name
- Luheria constricta Osborn, 1923

Synonyms
- Species synonymy: Tenucephalus hamatus DeLong, 1982

Genus of true bugs

Luheria constricta is a species of leafhopper in the subfamily Deltocephalinae. It has a large range from northern Argentina north through Bolivia and northeastern Brazil. It is the only member of the genus Luheria and the tribe Luheriini making them both monotypic taxa.

Luheria constricta is a medium to large leafhopper. Its color can range from yellow to orange to brown.

The species has an unusual 28S rDNA sequence which makes it difficult to perform phylogenetic analysis on the species, thus its position within Deltocephalinae is uncertain.
