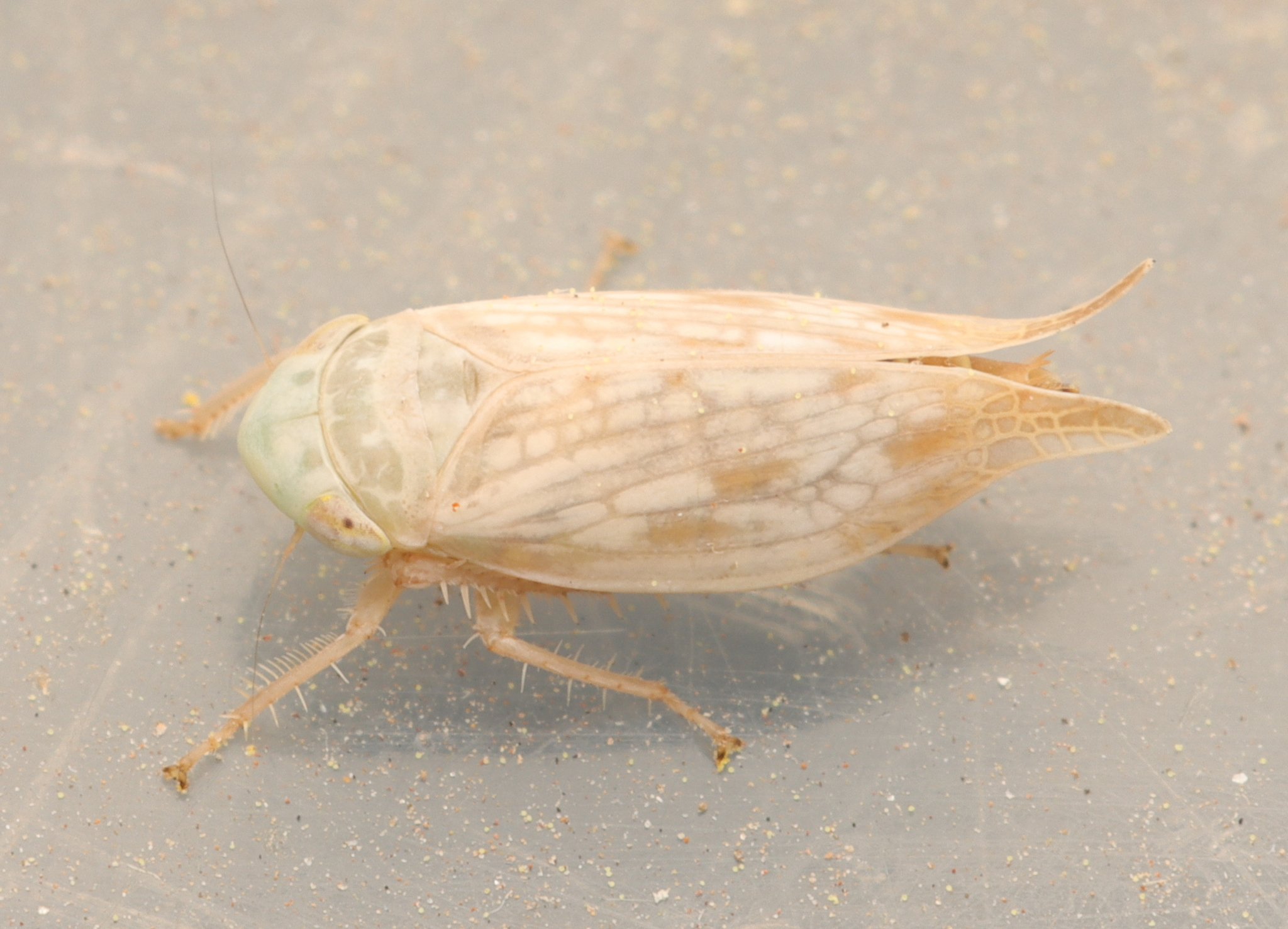
- Hadroca bualacauda

Scientific classification
- Kingdom: Animalia
- Phylum: Arthropoda
- Class: Insecta
- Order: Hemiptera
- Suborder: Auchenorrhyncha
- Family: Cicadellidae
- Tribe: Selenocephalini
- Subtribe: Bonaspeiina; Zahniser & Dietrich, 2013

Genera
- see text

= Bonaspeiina =

Tribe of leafhoppers

Bonaspeiina (previously a tribe) is a subtribe of leafhoppers in the subfamily Deltocephalinae. Bonaspeiini genera and species records are mostly from Southern Africa, where many species are found in the fynbos biome.

== Genera ==
The following genera are currently (2025) included:

- Basutoia Linnavuori, 1961
- Bloemia Theron, 1974
- Bonaspeia Linnavuori, 1961
- Bretega Stiller, 2017
- Caffrolix Linnavuori, 1961
- Capeolix Linnavuori, 1961
- Cerus Theron, 1975
- Colistra Davies, 1988
- Curvostylus Davies, 1987
- Dagama Distant, 1910
- Discolopeus Stiller, 2019
- Flavorubivolatus Stiller, 2021
- Gcaleka Naudé, 1926
- Geelus Stiller, 2020
- Hadroca Theron, 1974
- Johanus Theron, 1974
- Kaapia Theron, 1983
- Kimbella Davies, 1988
- Megaulon Theron, 1975
- Proekes Theron, 1975
- Proekoides Stiller, 1986
- Refrolix Theron, 1984
- Renosteria Theron, 1974
- Retevolatus Stiller, 2021
- Salsocolila McKamey, 2003
- Salsolibia Theron, 1979
- Tzitzikamaia Linnavuori, 1961
- Xhoreus Stiller & Webb, 2022
