= Acinopterini =

Scientific classification
- Domain: Eukaryota
- Kingdom: Animalia
- Phylum: Arthropoda
- Class: Insecta
- Order: Hemiptera
- Suborder: Auchenorrhyncha
- Family: Cicadellidae
- Subfamily: Deltocephalinae
- Tribe: Acinopterini; Oman, 1943

Tribe of true bugs

Acinopterini is a tribe of leafhoppers in the subfamily Deltocephalinae. Acinopterini is made up of 2 genera over 35 species. Acinopterus is widely distributed throughout North and South America with more than 30 species; Cariancha and its two species are endemic to Brazil.

== Genera ==
There are currently two described genera in the tribe Acinopterini:

- Acinopterus Van Duzee, 1892
- Cariancha Oman, 1938
