= Cicadulini =

Scientific classification
- Kingdom: Animalia
- Phylum: Arthropoda
- Class: Insecta
- Order: Hemiptera
- Suborder: Auchenorrhyncha
- Family: Cicadellidae
- Subfamily: Deltocephalinae
- Tribe: Cicadulini; Van Duzee, 1892

Synonyms
- Procepitina Dmitriev, 2002

Tribe of leafhoppers

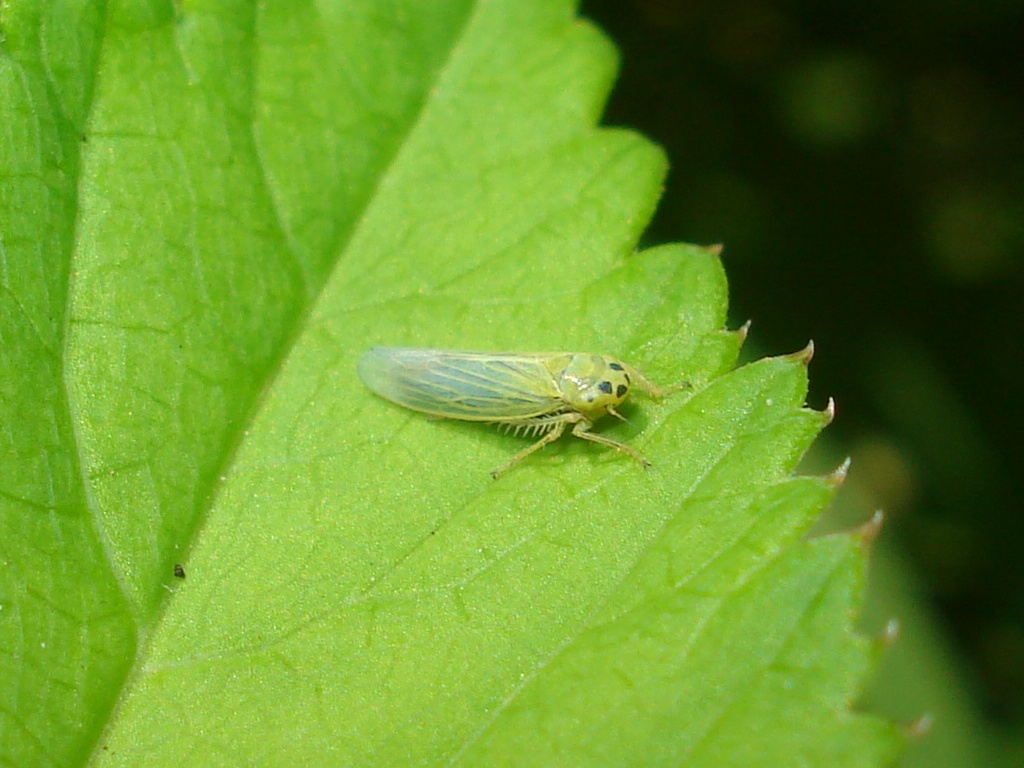
Cicadulini

Cicadulini is a tribe of leafhoppers in the subfamily Deltocephalinae. There are 15 genera and over 120 species in Cicadulini.

== Genera ==
There are 15 described genera in Cicadulini:

- Calanana DeLong, 1945
- Cicadula Zetterstedt, 1840
- Dudanus Dlabola, 1956
- Elymana DeLong, 1936
- Hecadula Dietrich & rakitov, 2002
- Knullana DeLong, 1941
- Mocydia Edwards, 1922
- Mocydiopsis Ribaut, 1939
- Morinda Emeljanov, 1972
- Paluda DeLong, 1937
- Proceps Mulsant & Rey, 1855
- Pseudosubhimalus Ghauri, 1974
- Rhopalopyx Ribaut, 1939
- Stenometopiellus Haupt, 1917
- Taurotettix Haupt, 1929
