= Vartini =

Scientific classification
- Kingdom: Animalia
- Phylum: Arthropoda
- Class: Insecta
- Order: Hemiptera
- Suborder: Auchenorrhyncha
- Family: Cicadellidae
- Subfamily: Deltocephalinae
- Tribe: Vartini; Zahniser & Dietrich, 2013

Subtribes and Genera
- see text

Tribe of true bugs

Vartini is a tribe of leafhoppers in the subfamily Deltocephalinae. Phylogenetic studies have shown that Vartini is closely related to Punctulini.

== Genera ==
There are 2 subtribes in the Vartini:

Punctulina Dai, Zahniser, Viraktamath & Webb, 2017

- Punctulus Dai, Zahniser, Viraktamath & Webb, 2017

Vartina Zahniser & Dietrich, 2013

- Curvimonus Viraktamath & Anantha Murthy, 1999
- Shivania Viraktamath, 2004
- Stymphalus Stål, 1866
- Varta Distant, 1908
- Vartalapa Viraktamath, 2004
- Vartatopa Viraktamath, 2004
- Xenovarta Viraktamath, 2004
