= Ikelibeloha =

Scientific classification
- Domain: Eukaryota
- Kingdom: Animalia
- Phylum: Arthropoda
- Class: Insecta
- Order: Hemiptera
- Suborder: Auchenorrhyncha
- Family: Cicadellidae
- Genus: Ikelibeloha; Zahniser & Nielson, 2012

Genus of insects

Ikelibeloha is a genus of leafhoppers belonging to the family Cicadellidae.

The species of this genus are endemic to Madagascar.

Species:

- Ikelibeloha cristata Zahniser & Nielson, 2012
