= Vulturnus (leafhopper) =

Scientific classification
- Kingdom: Animalia
- Phylum: Arthropoda
- Class: Insecta
- Order: Hemiptera
- Suborder: Auchenorrhyncha
- Family: Cicadellidae
- Genus: Vulturnus; Kirkaldy, 1906

Genus of leafhoppers

Vulturnus is a genus of leafhoppers belonging to the family Cicadellidae.

The species of this genus are found in Australia.

Species:

- Vulturnus coloratus Evans, 1972
- Vulturnus cyclopensis Evans, 1972
