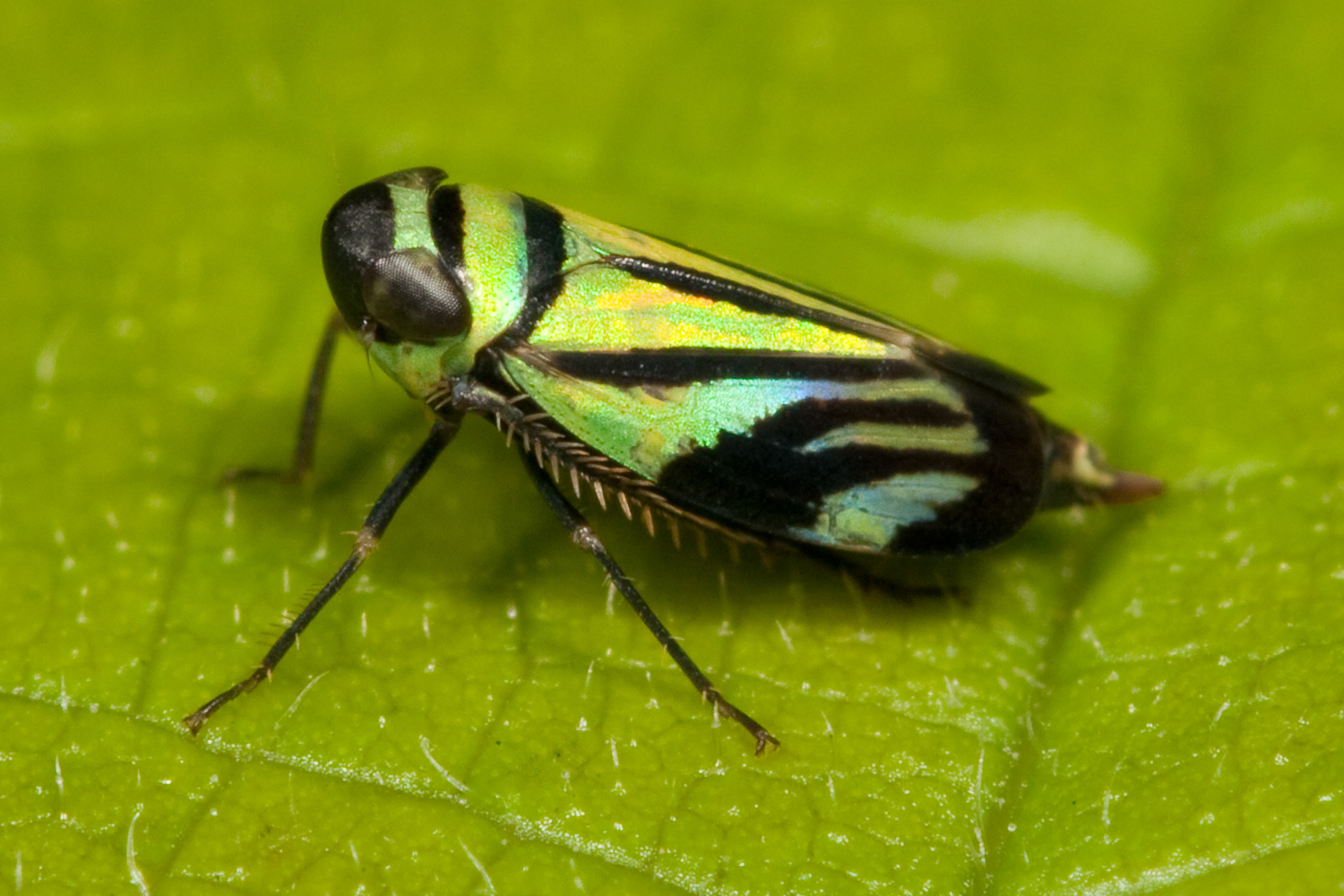

Scientific classification
- Domain: Eukaryota
- Kingdom: Animalia
- Phylum: Arthropoda
- Class: Insecta
- Order: Hemiptera
- Suborder: Auchenorrhyncha
- Family: Cicadellidae
- Genus: Stirellus
- Species: S. bicolor

Binomial name
- Stirellus bicolor Van Duzee, 1892

Synonyms
- Athysanus bicolor Van Duzee, 1892; Athysanus obtusus Van Duzee, 1892 (Preocc.); Deltocephalus virgulatus Osborn, 1892 (Unav.); Athysanus obtutus Van Duzee, 1892 (Unav.); Athysanus obtutus Van Duzee, 1892; Deltocephalus virgulatulus Van Duzee, 1894 (Unav.); Deltocephalus virgulatus Uhler, 1895

= Stirellus bicolor =

Species of true bug

Stirellus bicolor is a species of leafhopper native to North America. Two color forms are known. Adults found during the summer in hot climates are typically iridescent with prominent black stripes. Specimens in cooler climates are drab with translucent wings. The two varieties were originally thought to be separate species.

Stirellus bicolor feeds on bluestem grasses and broomsedge.

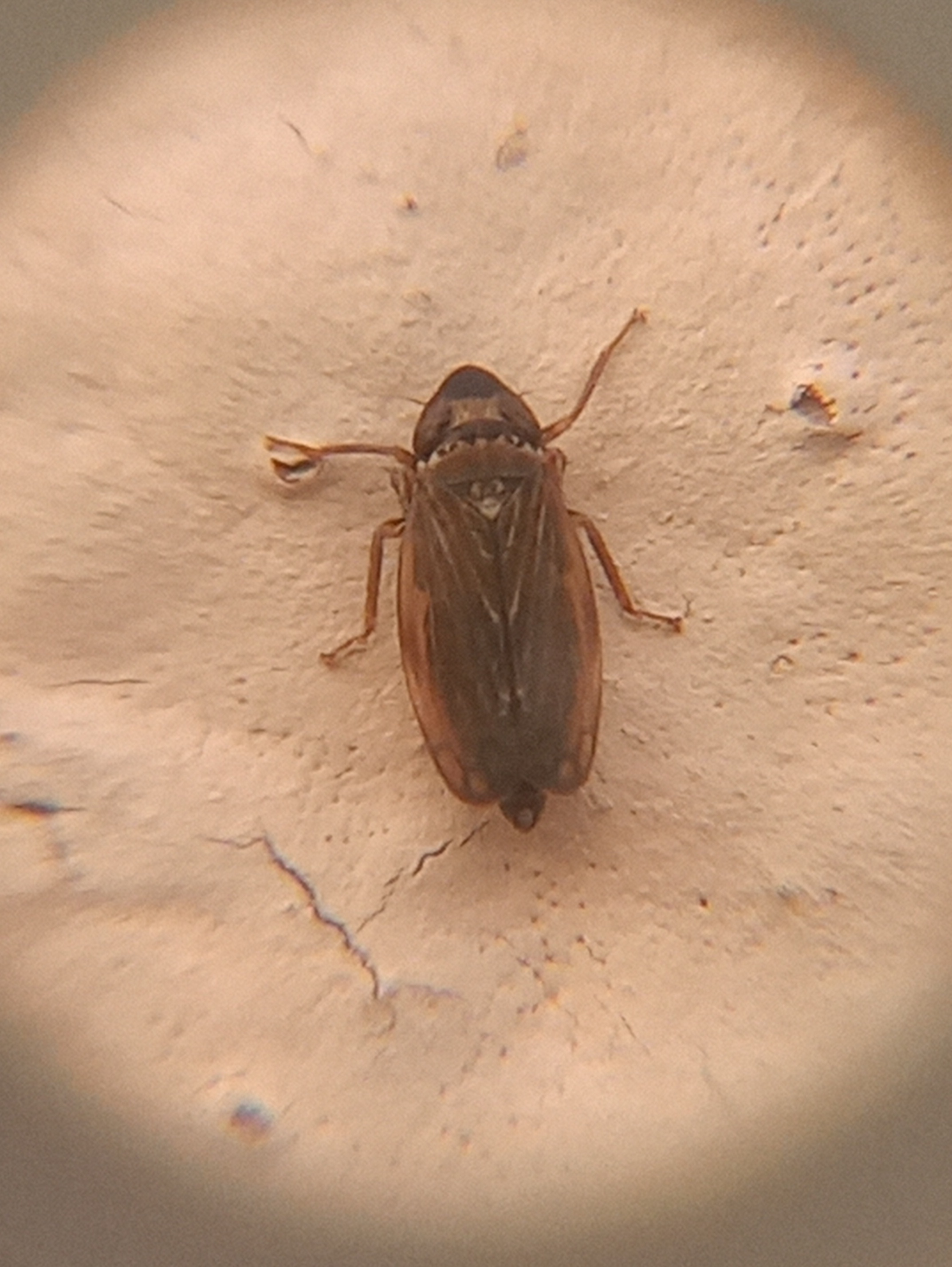
Dark color form
