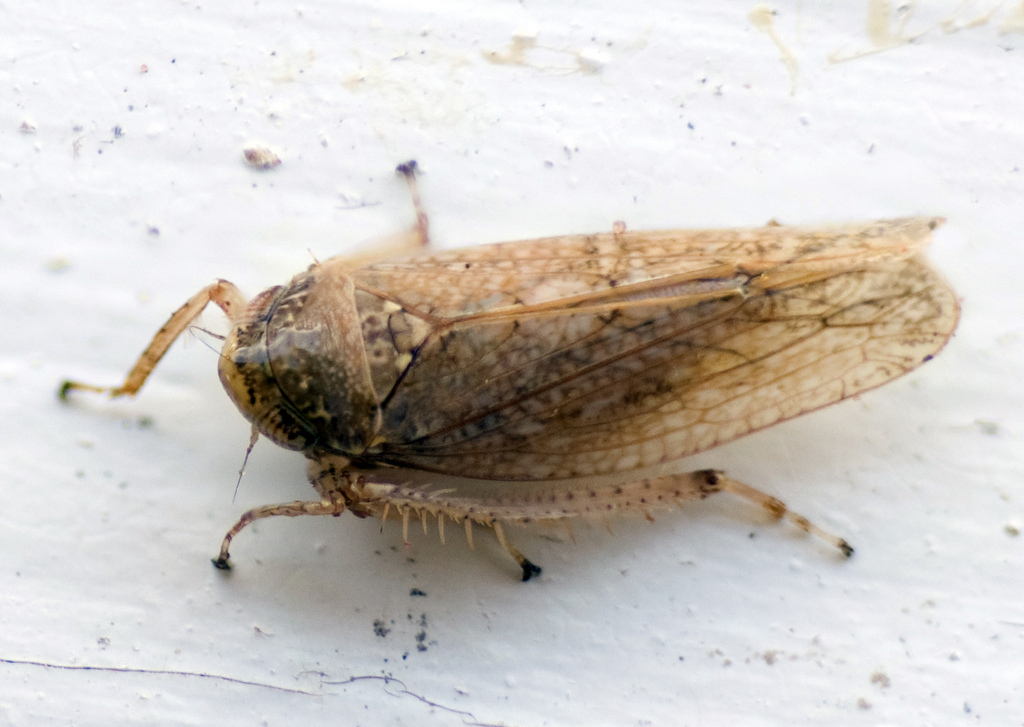

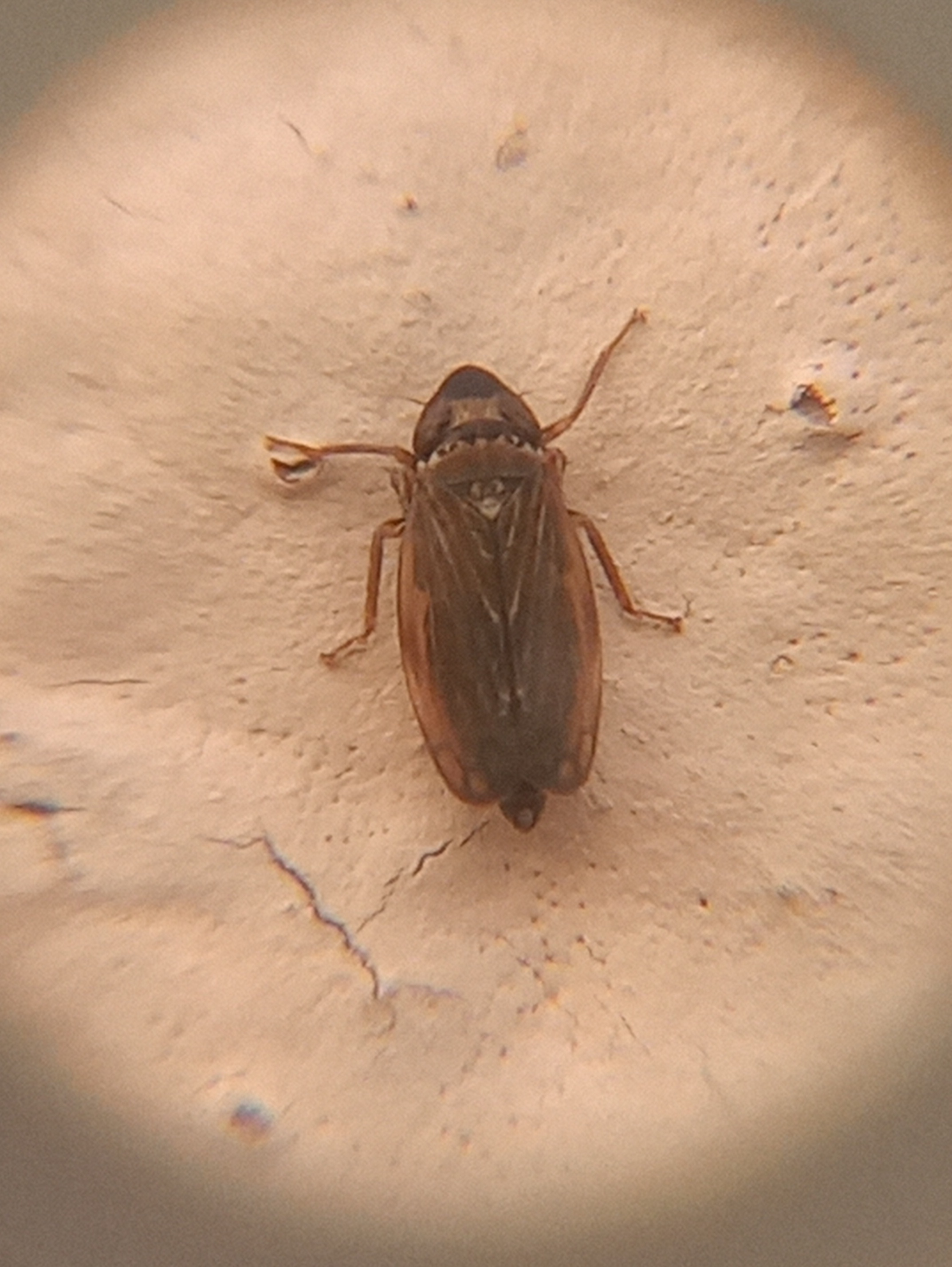
- Texananus sp., a genus characterized by the three white dots on the scutellum Stirellus bicolor

Scientific classification
- Kingdom: Animalia
- Phylum: Arthropoda
- Clade: Pancrustacea
- Class: Insecta
- Order: Hemiptera
- Suborder: Auchenorrhyncha
- Family: Cicadellidae
- Subfamily: Deltocephalinae; Fieber, 1869

Synonyms
- Deltocephalidae Fieber, 1869; Deltocephalides Fieber, 1869 (and other variants)

= Deltocephalinae =

Subfamily of leafhoppers

Deltocephalinae is a subfamily of leafhoppers. Deltocephalinae is the largest subfamily in the family Cicadellidae and is divided about 30 tribes, and 7280 described species. A few of these are significant agricultural pests including green leafhopprs of rice in the tribe Chiasmini.

== Tribes ==
The World Auchenorrhyncha Database includes the following (the 2013 review included about 10 tribe names that have been moved to other subfamilies or depreciated to subtribes: as indicated here):

1. Acinopterini Oman, 1943
2. Acostemmini Evans, 1972
3. Arrugadini Linnavuori, 1965
4. Athysanini Van Duzee, 1892
  1. Cochlorhinina Oman, 1943
  2. Koebeliina Baker, 1897
5. Bahitini Zahniser & Dietrich, 2013
6. Chiasmini Distant, 1908
7. Cicadulini Van Duzee, 1892
8. Deltocephalini Fieber, 1869
9. Dorycephalini Oman, 1943
10. Eupelicini Sahlberg, 1871
  1. Drakensbergenina Linnavuori, 1979
  2. Stenometopiina Baker, 1923
11. Faltalini Zahniser & Dietrich, 2010
12. Fieberiellini Wagner, 1951
13. Goniagnathini Wagner, 1951
14. Hecalini Distant, 1908
15. Limotettigini Baker, 1915
16. Luheriini Linnavuori, 1959
17. Macrostelini Kirkaldy, 1906
18. Magnentiini Linnavuori, 1978
19. Mukariini Distant, 1908
20. Occinirvanini Evans, 1966
21. Opsiini Emeljanov, 1962
22. Paralimnini Distant, 1908
23. Pendarini Dmitriev, 2009
24. Penthimiini Kirschbaum, 1868
25. Scaphoideini Oman, 1943
  1. Drabescina Ishihara, 1953
  2. Phlepsiina Zahniser & Dietrich, 2013
26. Scaphytopiini Oman, 1943
27. Selenocephalini Fieber, 1872
  1. Bonaspeiina Zahniser & Dietrich, 2013
  2. Hypacostemmina Linnavuori & Al-Ne’amy, 1983
28. Stegelytrini Baker, 1915
29. Tetartostylini Wagner, 1951
30. Vartini Zahniser & Dietrich, 2013
  1. Punctulina Dai, Zahniser, Viraktamath & Webb, 2017
  2. Vartina Zahniser & Dietrich, 2013

Incertae sedis

- Brincadorus Oman, 1938
- Saltadorus Camisão de Vasconcelos, Zahniser & Takiya, 2024
- Other genera/species
