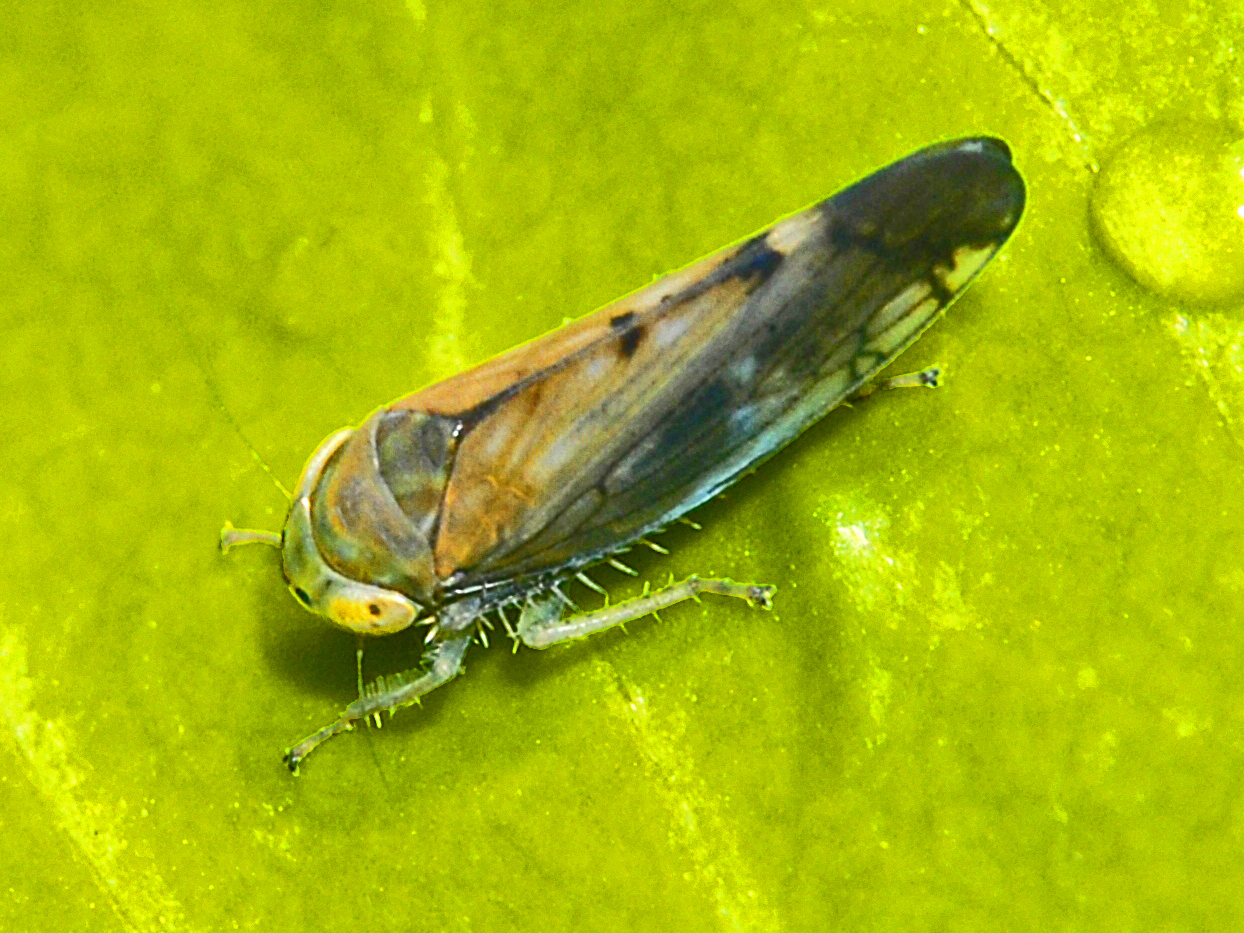
- Anoplotettix fuscovenosus

Scientific classification
- Kingdom: Animalia
- Phylum: Arthropoda
- Class: Insecta
- Order: Hemiptera
- Suborder: Auchenorrhyncha
- Family: Cicadellidae
- Subfamily: Deltocephalinae
- Tribe: Athysanini; Van Duzee, 1892

Synonyms
- Phrynomorphini Kirkaldy, 1907; Thamnotettigini Distant, 1908; Euscelini Van Duzee, 1917; Anoterostemmini Haupt, 1929; Bobacellini Kusnezov, 1929; Platymetopiini Haupt, 1929; Colladonini Bliven, 1955; Cerrillini Linnavuori, 1975; Allygidiina Dmitriev, 2006

= Athysanini =

Tribe of true bugs

Athysanini is a tribe of leafhoppers in the subfamily Deltocephalinae. The type genus of the tribe is Athysanus. The tribe has a cosmopolitan distribution. It is the largest tribe in the subfamily Deltocephalinae and has 232 genera in 3 subtribes.

== Genera ==
There are currently (2025) three subtribes:

Athysanina Van Duzee, 1892

- Abrus Dai & Zhang, 2002
- Acacimenus Dlabola, 1979
- Acunasus DeLong, 1945
- Aeternus Distant, 1918
- Aindrahamia Linnavuori, 1965
- Albicostella Ishihara, 1953
- Aligia Ball, 1907
- Alladanus DeLong & Harlan, 1968
- Allophleps Bergroth, 1920
- Allotapes Emeljanov, 1964
- Allygidius Ribaut, 1948
- Allygus Fieber, 1872
- Amblytelinus Lindberg, 1954
- Anaemotettix Korolevskaya, 1980
- Ancudana DeLong & Martinson, 1974
- Andanus Linnavuori, 1959
- Angubahita DeLong, 1982
- Angulanus DeLong, 1946
- Anoterostemma Löw, 1885
- Antoniellus Linnavuori, 1959
- Aplanatus Cheng, 1980
- Aplanus Oman, 1949
- Aplanusiella Nielson & Haws, 1992
- Arahura Knight, 1975
- Arawa Knight, 1975
- Argyrilla Emeljanov, 1972
- Aricanus Linnavuori, 1959
- Artianus Ribaut, 1942
- Artucephalus DeLong, 1943
- Asiotoxum Emeljanov, 1964
- Asthenotettix Korolevskaya, 1980
- Atanus Oman, 1938
- Athysanus Burmeister, 1838
- Awasha Heller & Linnavuori, 1968
- Bambusana Anufriev, 1969
- Bambusananus Li & Xing, 2024
- Bandara Ball, 1931
- Bardana DeLong, 1980
- Baroma Oman, 1938
- Benibahita Linnavuori, 1959
- Bergolix Linnavuori, 1959
- Biluscelis Dlabola, 1980
- Bilusius Ribaut, 1942
- Bobacella Kusnezov, 1929
- Bolotheta Kramer, 1963
- Bonneyana Oman, 1949
- Brachylope Emeljanov, 1962
- Brachypterona Lindberg, 1954
- Branchana Li, 2024
- Brasilanus Linnavuori, 1959
- Brazosa Oman, 1938
- Cahya Linnavuori, 1959
- Caladonus Oman, 1949
- Caranavia Linnavuori, 1959
- Carelmapu Linnavuori, 1959
- Cerrillus Oman, 1938
- Cetexa Oman, 1949
- Chaparea Linnavuori, 1959
- Chimaerotettix Dietrich & Rakitov, 2002
- Chroocacus Emeljanov, 1962
- Cocrassana Blocker & Larsen, 1991
- Comayagua Linnavuori & DeLong, 1978
- Condylotes Emeljanov, 1959
- Conosanus Osborn & Ball, 1902
- Conoscelis Abdul-Nour, 1988
- Consepusa Linnavuori & DeLong, 1977
- Conversana DeLong, 1967
- Costamia DeLong, 1946
- Coulinus Beirne, 1954
- Cozadanus DeLong & Harlan, 1968
- Crassana DeLong & Hershberger, 1947
- Cyanidius Emeljanov, 1964
- Cyclevertex Li & Xing, 2024
- Dampfiana DeLong & Hershberger, 1948
- Danbara Oman, 1949
- Deltorynchus DeLong, 1943
- Desertana DeLong & Martinson, 1973
- Divitiacus Distant, 1918
- Dlabolaracus Remane, 1961
- Doleranus Ball, 1936
- Doliotettix Ribaut, 1942
- Dolyobius Linnavuori, 1959
- Duocrassana Pinedo-Escatel, Zahniser & Dietrich, 2016
- Ederranus Ribaut, 1942
- Egenus Oman, 1938
- Ephelodes Emeljanov, 1972
- Euleimonios Kirkaldy, 1906
- Eusama Oman, 1949
- Euscelidius Ribaut, 1942
- Euscelis Brullé, 1832
- Eusceloidia Osborn, 1923
- Eusora Oman, 1949
- Eutettix Van Duzee, 1892
- Excavanus DeLong, 1946
- Extrusanus Oman, 1949
- Fistulatus Zhang, 1997
- Fitchana Oman, 1949
- Floridonus Oman, 1949
- Fridonus Oman, 1949
- Fuscmacula Yao, Zhang & Xing, 2021
- Garapita Oman, 1938
- Goiattus Pinedo-Escatel, 2020
- Graphocraerus Thomson, 1869
- Gunawardenea Fletcher & Moir, 2008
- Hamulotettix Dai & Zhang, 2011
- Handianus Ribaut, 1942
- Hegira Oman, 1938
- Hesium Ribaut, 1942
- Houtbayana Linnavuori, 1961
- Huancabamba Linnavuori, 1959
- Idiodonus Ball, 1936
- Inghamia Evans, 1966
- Jaacunga Nielson, 1988
- Jakarellus Webb, 1980
- Krameraxus Maldonado-Capriles, 1968
- Laburrus Ribaut, 1942
- Lajolla Linnavuori, 1959
- Laminacutus Abdul-Nour, 2002
- Lamprotettix Ribaut, 1952
- Lascumbresa Linnavuori & DeLong, 1979
- Latinocesa Koçak & Kemal, 2010
- Laylatina Abdul-Nour, 1988
- Lineana Li & Xing, 2024
- Lojanus Linnavuori, 1959
- Loralia Evans, 1966
- Macustus Ribaut, 1942
- Malasiella Evans, 1954
- Matsumurella Ishihara, 1953
- Melillaia Linnavuori, 1971
- Mesadorus Linnavuori, 1955
- Mexicananus DeLong, 1944
- Mimallygus Ribaut, 1948
- Mimodorus Linnavuori, 1959
- Mimohardya Zakhvatkin, 1946
- Mocolinna McKamey, 2003
- Moskgha Deeming & Webb, 1982
- Nakaharanus Ishihara, 1953
- Napo Linnavuori & DeLong, 1976
- Neocrassana Linnavuori, 1959
- Neodonus DeLong & Hershberger, 1948
- Neohegira Linnavuori & DeLong, 1978
- Neomacednus Xing & Li, 2011
- Neomesus Linnavuori, 1959
- Neoreticulum Dai, 2009
- Nesophryne Kirkaldy, 1907
- Neurotettix Matsumura, 1914
- Nigridonus Oman, 1949
- Norvellina Ball, 1931
- Nurenus Oman, 1949
- Occiplanocephalus Evans, 1942
- Okaundua Linnavuori, 1968
- Ollarianus Ball, 1936
- Omansobara Xing, 2017
- Ophionotum Emeljanov, 1964
- Orientus DeLong, 1938
- Oxytettigella Metcalf, 1952
- Pachytettix Linnavuori, 1959
- Paracolladonus Nielson, 1988
- Paracrassana Nielson, 1988
- Paraganus Linnavuori, 1955
- Paranurenus Nielson, 1988
- Paratanus Young, 1957
- Phaeida Emeljanov, 1962
- Phlepsobahita Linnavuori, 1959
- Phycotettix Haupt, 1929
- Pingellus Evans, 1966
- Pithyotettix Ribaut, 1942
- Platymetopius Burmeister, 1838^{c g b}
- Poliona Emeljanov, 1972
- Protensus Zhang & Dai, 2001
- Pseudalaca Linnavuori, 1959
- Pseudaligia Kramer & DeLong, 1968
- Pseudonapo Pinedo-Escatel & Dietrich, 2020
- Pseutettix DeLong, 1967
- Pygotettix Matsumura, 1940
- Renonus DeLong, 1959
- Retusanus DeLong, 1945
- Rhytistylus Fieber, 1875
- Rinconada Linnavuori & DeLong, 1977
- Sanuca DeLong, 1980
- Sardius Ribaut, 1946
- Scaphetus Evans, 1966
- Scaphomonoides Li, 2011
- Scaphytoceps Dlabola, 1957
- Scenergates Emeljanov, 1972
- Selachina Emeljanov, 1962
- Serratus Linnavuori, 1959
- Sincholata DeLong, 1982
- Sotanus Ribaut, 1942
- Spaltumtettix Pinedo-Escatel & Dietrich, 2020
- Speudotettix Ribaut, 1942
- Spinulana DeLong, 1967
- Stenometohardya Dlabola, 1981
- Stenomisella Evans, 1954
- Stictocoris Thomson, 1869
- Stoneana DeLong, 1943
- Streptanus Ribaut, 1942
- Streptopyx Linnavuori, 1958
- Stymphalella Evans, 1954
- Syringius Emeljanov, 1966
- Tambocerus Zhang & Webb, 1996
- Tapetia Emeljanov, 1964
- Tenuisanus DeLong, 1944
- Thamnotettix Zetterstedt, 1837
- Thanomahia Dlabola, 1987
- Tingolix Linnavuori & DeLong, 1978
- Twiningia Ball, 1931
- Usanus DeLong, 1947
- Yungasia Linnavuori, 1959
- Zabrosa Oman, 1949
- Zercanus Dlabola, 1965
- Zilkaria Menezes, 1974

Cochlorhinina Oman, 1943
Koebeliina Baker, 1897
