= Athysanus =

Athysanus may refer to:

- Athysanus (leafhopper), a true bug genus in the subfamily Deltocephalinae
- Athysanus (plant), a plant genus in the family Brassicaceae
- Pleistodontes athysanus, a fig wasp species native to Australia
