= Koebeliini =

Scientific classification
- Kingdom: Animalia
- Phylum: Arthropoda
- Clade: Pancrustacea
- Class: Insecta
- Order: Hemiptera
- Suborder: Auchenorrhyncha
- Family: Cicadellidae
- Tribe: Athysanini
- Subtribe: Koebeliina; Baker, 1897

Synonyms
- Grypotini Haupt, 1929

Tribe of true bugs

Koebeliina (previously tribe Koebeliini) is a subtribe of leafhoppers in the tribe Athysanini and subfamily Deltocephalinae. There are 6 genera and over 15 species: Koebellina and Grypotina. Koebeliina species are endemic to western North America.

== Genera ==
There are 6 described genera in this subtribe:

- Grypotellus Emeljanov, 1999
- Grypotes Fieber, 1866
- Koebelia Baker, 1897
- Pinopona Viraktamath & Sohi, 1998
- Shivapona Ghauri & Viraktamath, 1987
- Sohipona Ghauri & Viraktamath, 1987
