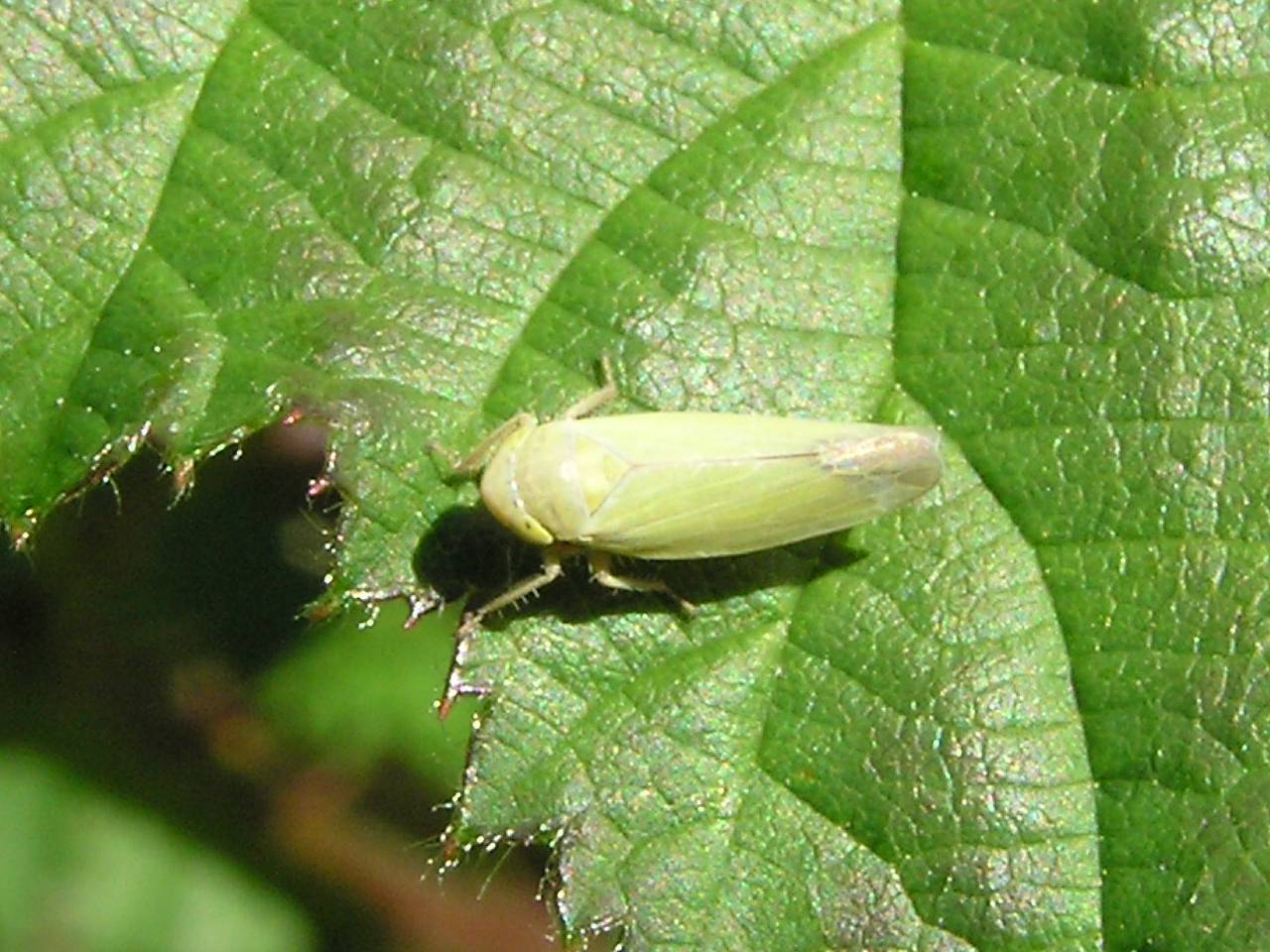

Scientific classification
- Domain: Eukaryota
- Kingdom: Animalia
- Phylum: Arthropoda
- Class: Insecta
- Order: Hemiptera
- Suborder: Auchenorrhyncha
- Family: Cicadellidae
- Subfamily: Deltocephalinae
- Tribe: Cochlorhinini
- Genus: Gloridonus
- Subgenus: Ballana; DeLong, 1936

= Ballana (leafhopper) =

Subgenus of true bugs

Ballana is a subgenus of Gloridonus in the leafhopper family Cicadellidae. There are at least 50 described species in Ballana.

== Species ==
These species are members of the Ballana subgenus:

- Gloridonus adversus DeLong, 1937
- Gloridonus ajo Hamilton, 2014
- Gloridonus angulus DeLong, 1937
- Gloridonus aptus DeLong, 1964
- Gloridonus arcuatus DeLong, 1964
- Gloridonus atelus DeLong, 1964
- Gloridonus atridorsum Van Duzee, 1894
- Gloridonus baja Hamilton, 2014
- Gloridonus basala DeLong, 1964
- Gloridonus bifidus DeLong, 1937
- Gloridonus calceus DeLong, 1937
- Gloridonus caliperus DeLong, 1937
- Gloridonus callidus DeLong, 1937
- Gloridonus chiragricus Ball, 1900
- Gloridonus chrysothamnus DeLong & Davidson, 1934
- Gloridonus cuna DeLong, 1937
- Gloridonus curtus DeLong, 1964
- Gloridonus curvatus DeLong, 1964
- Gloridonus delea DeLong, 1937
- Gloridonus dena DeLong, 1937
- Gloridonus dolus DeLong, 1964
- Gloridonus effusus DeLong, 1964
- Gloridonus filamenta DeLong, 1937
- Gloridonus flexus DeLong, 1964
- Gloridonus forfex Hamilton, 2014
- Gloridonus gerula Ball, 1910
- Gloridonus hamus DeLong, 1937
- Gloridonus hebeus DeLong, 1937
- Gloridonus indens DeLong, 1937
- Gloridonus ipis DeLong, 1964
- Gloridonus jacumba Hamilton, 2014
- Gloridonus nigridens DeLong, 1937
- Gloridonus occidentalis DeLong, 1937
- Gloridonus ornatus DeLong, 1964
- Gloridonus orthus DeLong, 1937
- Gloridonus plenus DeLong, 1937
- Gloridonus polica DeLong, 1937
- Gloridonus projectus DeLong, 1964
- Gloridonus quintini Hamilton, 2014
- Gloridonus recurvatus DeLong, 1937
- Gloridonus secus DeLong, 1937
- Gloridonus spinosus DeLong, 1937
- Gloridonus titusi Ball, 1910
- Gloridonus traversus DeLong, 1964
- Gloridonus undatus DeLong, 1964
- Gloridonus vastulus Ball, 1910
- Gloridonus velosus DeLong, 1937
- Gloridonus venditarius Ball, 1910
- Gloridonus verutus Van Duzee, 1925
- Gloridonus vescus Ball, 1910
- Gloridonus vetulus Ball, 1910
- Gloridonus viriosus Ball, 1910
- Gloridonus visalia Ball, 1910
- Gloridonus vivatus Ball, 1910
- Gloridonus yolo Hamilton, 2014
