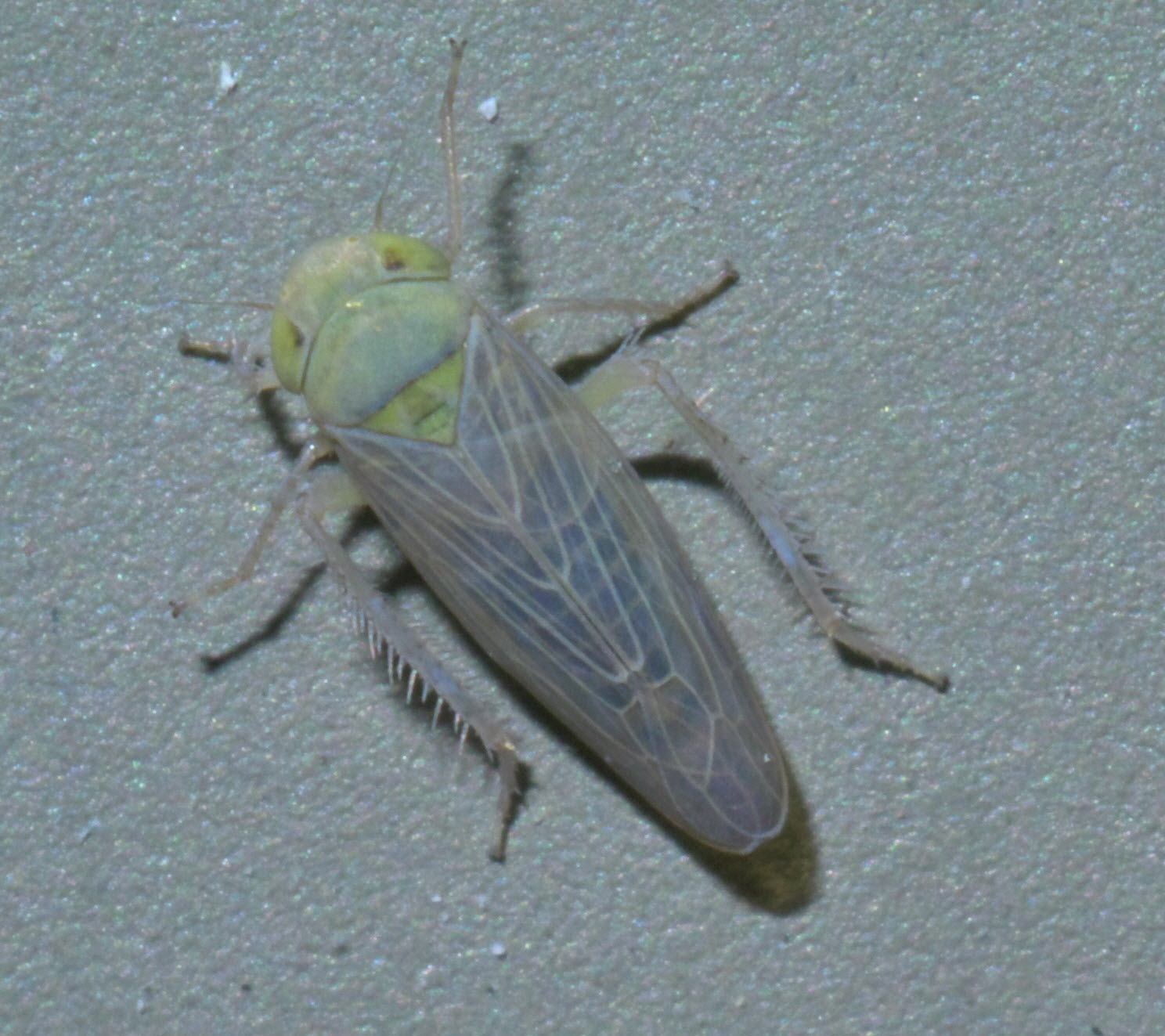

Scientific classification
- Kingdom: Animalia
- Phylum: Arthropoda
- Clade: Pancrustacea
- Class: Insecta
- Order: Hemiptera
- Suborder: Auchenorrhyncha
- Family: Cicadellidae
- Tribe: Athysanini
- Subtribe: Cochlorhinina
- Genus: Gloridonus; Ball, 1936

Subgenera
- Ballana DeLong, 1936; Gloridellus Hamilton, 2014; Gloridonus Ball, 1936; Laterana DeLong, 1936

= Gloridonus =

Genus of true bugs

Gloridonus is a genus of leafhoppers in the family Cicadellidae. There are more than 80 described species in Gloridonus.

There are four subgenera in Gloridonus, the largest of which is the former genus Ballana, which was incorporated into Gloridonus in 2014.

== Species ==
These species belong to the genus Gloridonus:

- Gloridonus abruptus DeLong, 1964
- Gloridonus adversus DeLong, 1937
- Gloridonus ajo Hamilton, 2014
- Gloridonus amplectus DeLong, 1935
- Gloridonus angulus DeLong, 1937
- Gloridonus aptus DeLong, 1964
- Gloridonus arcuatus DeLong, 1964
- Gloridonus arma DeLong, 1937
- Gloridonus atelus DeLong, 1964
- Gloridonus atridorsum Van Duzee, 1894
- Gloridonus baja Hamilton, 2014
- Gloridonus basala DeLong, 1964
- Gloridonus bifidus DeLong, 1937
- Gloridonus calceus DeLong, 1937
- Gloridonus caliperus DeLong, 1937
- Gloridonus callidus DeLong, 1937
- Gloridonus chiragricus Ball, 1900
- Gloridonus chrysothamnus DeLong & Davidson, 1934
- Gloridonus convergens DeLong, 1964
- Gloridonus cuna DeLong, 1937
- Gloridonus curtus DeLong, 1964
- Gloridonus curvatus DeLong, 1964
- Gloridonus delea DeLong, 1937
- Gloridonus dena DeLong, 1937
- Gloridonus densus DeLong, 1964
- Gloridonus directus DeLong, 1964
- Gloridonus dissimilatus Ball, 1910
- Gloridonus diutius DeLong, 1937
- Gloridonus dolus DeLong, 1964
- Gloridonus eburatus Hamilton, 2014
- Gloridonus effusus DeLong, 1964
- Gloridonus elexa DeLong, 1937
- Gloridonus extremus DeLong, 1964
- Gloridonus filamenta DeLong, 1937
- Gloridonus flexus DeLong, 1964
- Gloridonus forfex Hamilton, 2014
- Gloridonus gemellus Ball, 1910
- Gloridonus generosus Ball, 1910
- Gloridonus gerula Ball, 1910
- Gloridonus gloriosus Ball, 1910
- Gloridonus hamus DeLong, 1937
- Gloridonus hebeus DeLong, 1937
- Gloridonus indens DeLong, 1937
- Gloridonus ipis DeLong, 1964
- Gloridonus jacumba Hamilton, 2014
- Gloridonus knulli DeLong, 1964
- Gloridonus languidus Ball, 1902
- Gloridonus laterus DeLong, 1937
- Gloridonus latulus DeLong, 1937
- Gloridonus nigridens DeLong, 1937
- Gloridonus occidentalis DeLong, 1937
- Gloridonus ornatus DeLong, 1964
- Gloridonus orthus DeLong, 1937
- Gloridonus plenus DeLong, 1937
- Gloridonus polica DeLong, 1937
- Gloridonus projectus DeLong, 1964
- Gloridonus pulcher Hamilton, 2014
- Gloridonus quintini Hamilton, 2014
- Gloridonus radiatus DeLong, 1964
- Gloridonus recurvatus DeLong, 1937
- Gloridonus secus DeLong, 1937
- Gloridonus spatulatus Ball, 1936
- Gloridonus spinosus DeLong, 1937
- Gloridonus titusi Ball, 1910
- Gloridonus traversus DeLong, 1964
- Gloridonus tremulus DeLong, 1964
- Gloridonus undatus DeLong, 1964
- Gloridonus ursinus Ball, 1910
- Gloridonus vapidus Ball, 1910
- Gloridonus vastulus Ball, 1910
- Gloridonus velosus DeLong, 1937
- Gloridonus venditarius Ball, 1910
- Gloridonus verutus Van Duzee, 1925
- Gloridonus vescus Ball, 1910
- Gloridonus vespertinus Ball, 1910
- Gloridonus vetulus Ball, 1910
- Gloridonus viriosus Ball, 1910
- Gloridonus visalia Ball, 1910
- Gloridonus vivatus Ball, 1910
- Gloridonus xerophilus Hamilton, 2014
- Gloridonus xyston Hamilton, 2014
- Gloridonus yolo Hamilton, 2014
