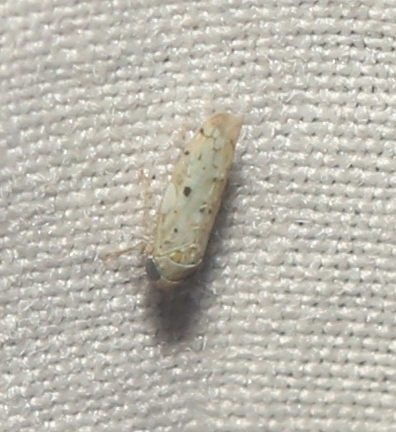
- Atanus perspicillatus, North Carolina

Scientific classification
- Kingdom: Animalia
- Phylum: Arthropoda
- Clade: Pancrustacea
- Class: Insecta
- Order: Hemiptera
- Suborder: Auchenorrhyncha
- Family: Cicadellidae
- Subfamily: Deltocephalinae
- Tribe: Athysanini
- Genus: Atanus
- Species: A. perspicillatus

Binomial name
- Atanus perspicillatus (Osborn & Ball, 1897)

Synonyms
- Doleranus perspicillatus (Osborn & Ball, 1897); Thamnotettix perspicillata Osborn & Ball, 1897; Thamnotettix perspicillatus Osborn & Ball, 1897

= Atanus perspicillatus =

Species of insect

Atanus perspicillatus is a species of typical leafhopper in the family Cicadellidae. It is found in North America.
