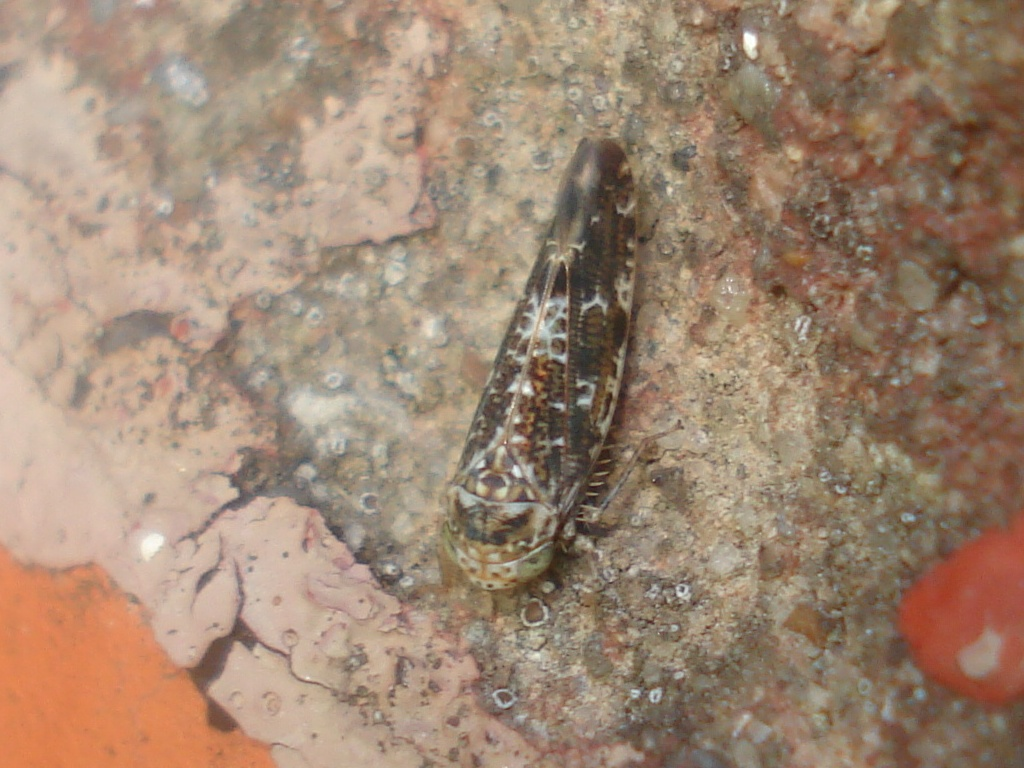
- An Allygus mixtus bug belonging to the Hemiptera order.

Scientific classification
- Domain: Eukaryota
- Kingdom: Animalia
- Phylum: Arthropoda
- Class: Insecta
- Order: Hemiptera
- Suborder: Auchenorrhyncha
- Family: Cicadellidae
- Genus: Allygus
- Species: A. mixtus

Binomial name
- Allygus mixtus (Fabricius, 1794)

= Allygus mixtus =

Species of true bug

Allygus mixtus is a species of true bug belonging to the family Cicadellidae.

Synonyms:

- Cicada mixtus Fabricius, 1794 (= basionym)
- Jassus corisipennis Ferrari, 1882
- Allygus alticola Horvath, 1903
