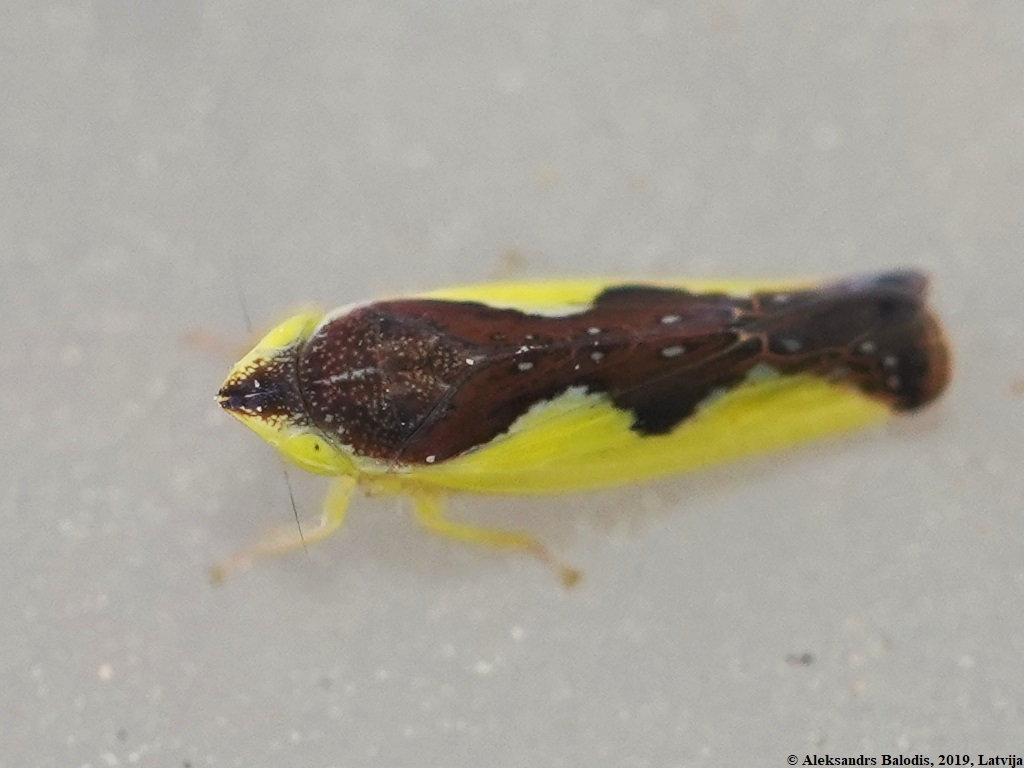

Scientific classification
- Kingdom: Animalia
- Phylum: Arthropoda
- Class: Insecta
- Order: Hemiptera
- Suborder: Auchenorrhyncha
- Family: Cicadellidae
- Tribe: Athysanini
- Genus: Platymetopius; Burmeister, 1838

= Platymetopius =

Genus of leafhoppers

Platymetopius is a genus of leafhoppers (subfamily Deltocephalinae), containing over 75 species, mostly Old World.

== Selected species ==
- Platymetopius abbreviatus
- Platymetopius abruptus Ball
