= Athysanus unilateralis =

Scientific classification
- Kingdom: Plantae
- Clade: Tracheophytes
- Clade: Angiosperms
- Clade: Eudicots
- Clade: Rosids
- Order: Brassicales
- Family: Brassicaceae
- Genus: Athysanus
- Species: A. unilateralis

Binomial name
- Athysanus unilateralis (M.E.Jones) Jeps.

Synonyms
- Draba unilateralis M.E.Jones; Heterodraba unilateralis (M.E.Jones) Greene

Species of flowering plant

Athysanus unilateralis is a species of flowering plant in the family Brassicaceae. It is an annual native to southern Oregon, California, and northern Baja California.

In California it is native to the Central Valley, Cascade Range foothills, inner and outer southern Coast Ranges, southern Sierra foothills, and Tehachapi Mountains.

The species was first described as Draba unilateralis by Marcus E. Jones in 1882. In 1901 Willis Linn Jepson placed the plant in genus Athysanus.
