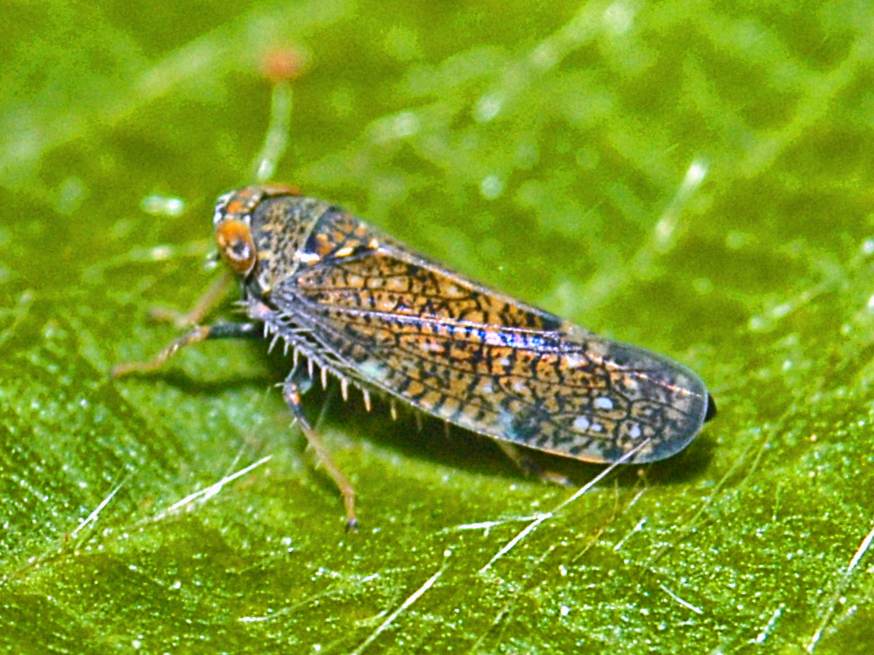
- Adult of Orientus ishidae

Scientific classification
- Kingdom: Animalia
- Phylum: Arthropoda
- Clade: Pancrustacea
- Class: Insecta
- Order: Hemiptera
- Suborder: Auchenorrhyncha
- Family: Cicadellidae
- Genus: Orientus
- Species: O. ishidae

Binomial name
- Orientus ishidae (Matsumura, 1902)

Synonyms
- Phlepsius ishidae Matsumura, 1902; Phlepsius tinctorius Sanders and DeLong, 1919

= Orientus ishidae =

Species of true bug

Orientus ishidae, the Japanese leafhopper or mosaic leafhopper, is a species of leafhopper belonging to the family Cicadellidae and subfamily Deltocephalinae.

== Description ==
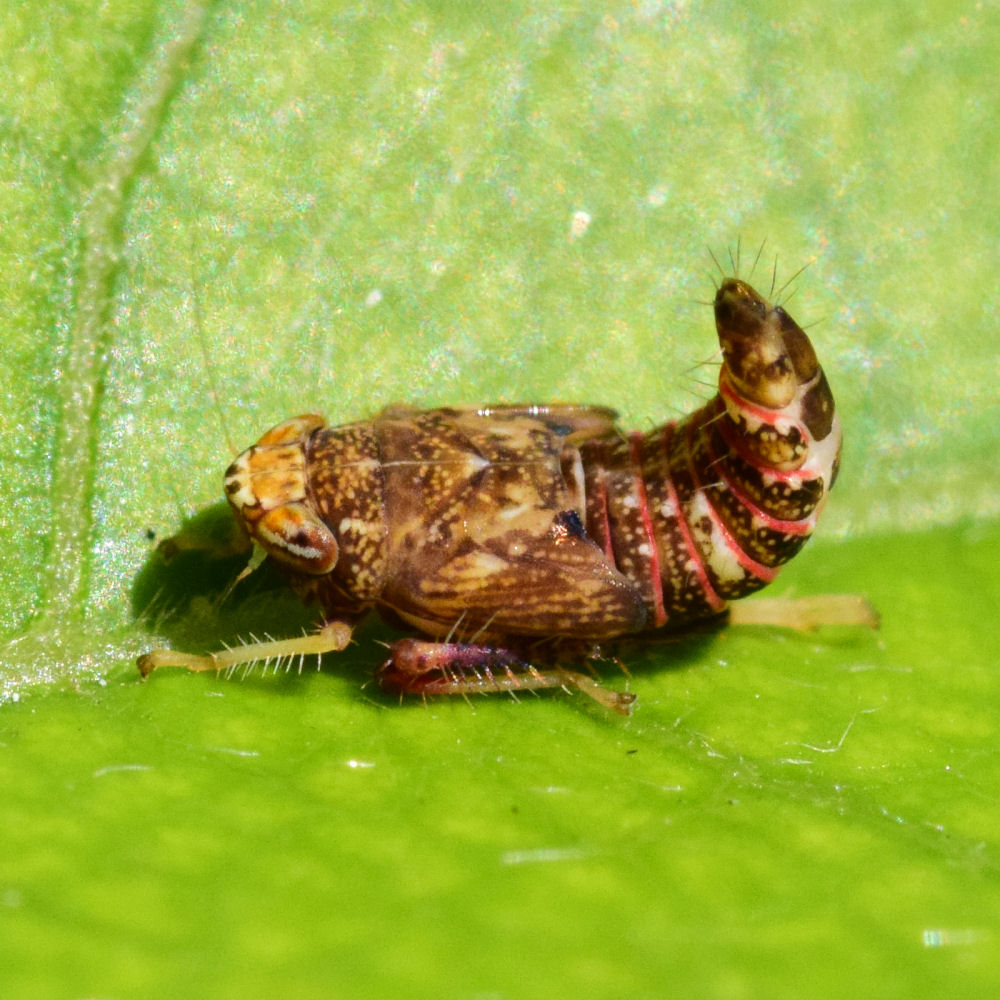
Nymph in a tail-up, defensive posture.

The adults reach 4.5–6.5 millimetres (0.18–0.26 in) of length. This leafhopper shows a distinctive mosaic-like pattern on the forewings and an orange band between the eyes. Orientus ishidae is associated with willow (Salix species), hornbeam (Carpinus betulus) and with many woody plants and deciduous trees. It may cause serious leaf damages to several tree species and is implicated as a vector of the phytoplasmic flavescence dorée (FD) disease in vineyards. Adults can be found from June to October.

The nymphs are strongly coloured, the patterning is variable. They often adopt a tail-up posture in response to danger.

== Distribution ==
This species is endemic to the East Palearctic realm and it is present in the Nearctic realm and the Oriental realm. It has been introduced in United Kingdom (first reported in Peckham, 2011), Germany, Italy, Switzerland and in several other European countries.
