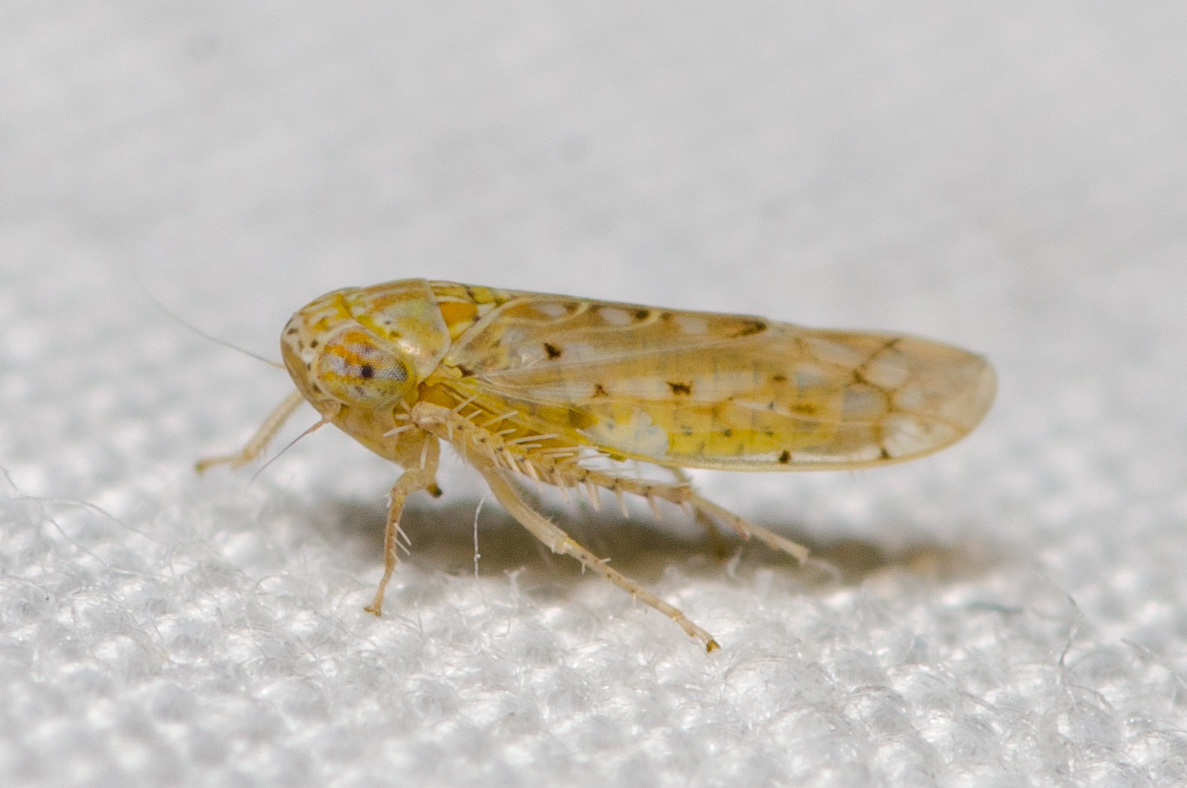
- Atanus, Texas

Scientific classification
- Kingdom: Animalia
- Phylum: Arthropoda
- Clade: Pancrustacea
- Class: Insecta
- Order: Hemiptera
- Suborder: Auchenorrhyncha
- Family: Cicadellidae
- Subfamily: Deltocephalinae
- Tribe: Athysanini
- Genus: Atanus; Oman, 1937

Synonyms
- Alanus DeLong & Hershberger, 1947; Antanus Oman, 1938; Fulvanus Linnavuori, 1955; Linnatanus de Menezes, 1973; Nerminia Koçak, 1981; Tubulanus Linnavuori, 1955

= Atanus =

Genus of insects

Atanus is a genus of typical leafhoppers in the family Cicadellidae. There are more than 40 described species in Atanus, found in North, Central, and South America.

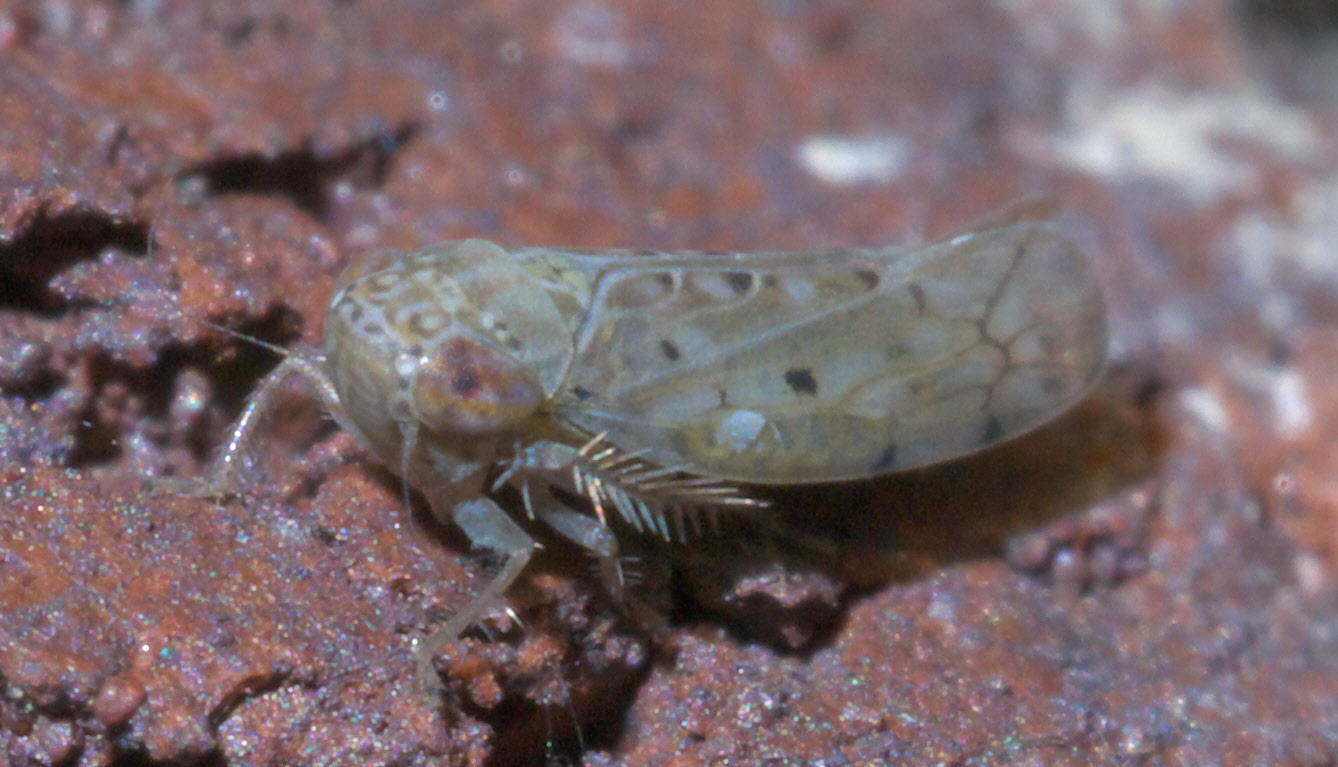
Atanus, Oklahoma

== Species ==
These 48 species belong to the genus Atanus:

- Atanus acutus Linnavuori & Heller, 1961
- Atanus albidus (DeLong & Hershberger, 1947)
- Atanus angustus Linnavuori, 1959
- Atanus atascasus (Ball, 1936)
- Atanus baianus Zanol, 1998
- Atanus bicornis Linnavuori & DeLong, 1976
- Atanus bifidus Linnavuori, 1959
- Atanus bos Linnavuori & DeLong, 1976
- Atanus cinchus DeLong, 1982
- Atanus cineratus (Linnavuori, 1959)
- Atanus contrarius Linnavuori, 1959
- Atanus coronatus (Berg, 1879)
- Atanus coxinus Zanol, 1998
- Atanus cristatus Linnavuori & DeLong, 1976
- Atanus curvilinea (Linnavuori, 1955)
- Atanus declivatus Linnavuori, 1959
- Atanus denticulatus Zanol, 1998
- Atanus dorsalis (Gillette, 1898)
- Atanus furcifer (Linnavuori, 1959)
- Atanus gracilis DeLong, 1978
- Atanus gracilus Cheng, 1980
- Atanus horridus Linnavuori & DeLong, 1976
- Atanus impictus Linnavuori & DeLong, 1979
- Atanus joaquinus (Linnavuori, 1973)
- Atanus lagunae (Linnavuori, 1959)
- Atanus laminus DeLong, 1978
- Atanus lobatus (Osborn, 1923)
- Atanus loriatus Cheng, 1980
- Atanus luqueatus Cheng, 1980
- Atanus mexicanus DeLong, 1978
- Atanus nitidus (Linnavuori, 1955)
- Atanus perplexus Linnavuori & DeLong, 1979
- Atanus perspicillatus (Osborn & Ball, 1897)
- Atanus picchuanus Linnavuori & DeLong, 1976
- Atanus rhopalus (Cheng, 1980)
- Atanus rubralineus (DeLong, 1924)
- Atanus runguenus Linnavuori & DeLong, 1977
- Atanus sagittifer Linnavuori & DeLong, 1979
- Atanus serratus Zanol, 1998
- Atanus serricauda (Linnavuori, 1959)
- Atanus serrulatus Zanol, 1998
- Atanus tenuis DeLong, 1978
- Atanus tesselatus (Osborn, 1923)
- Atanus texanus DeLong, 1978
- Atanus trifurcatus (Cheng, 1980)
- Atanus variatus Zanol, 1998
- Atanus viridis Linnavuori, 1955
- Atanus xanthopus Linnavuori, 1959
