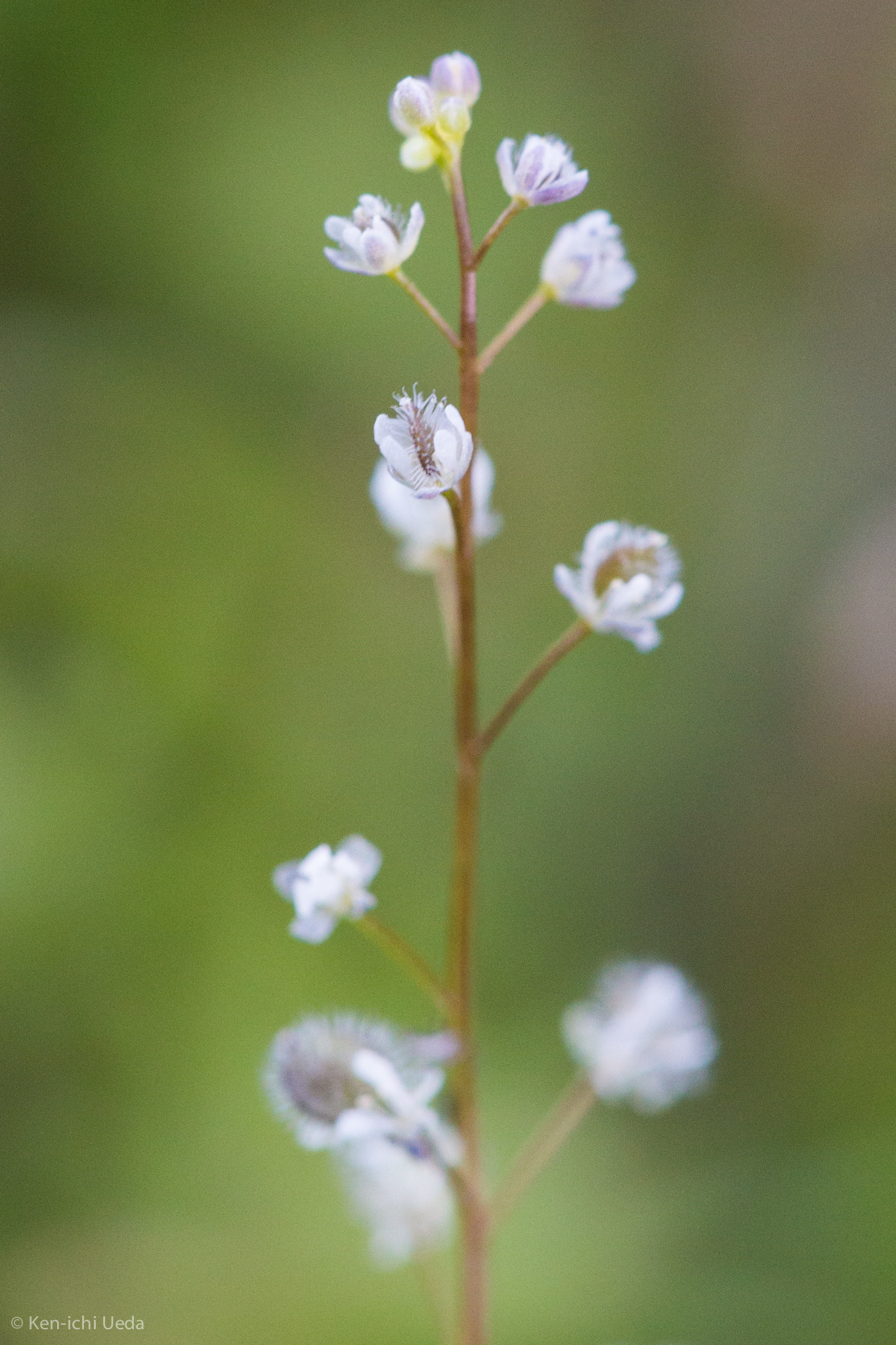

Conservation status
- Secure (NatureServe)

Scientific classification
- Kingdom: Plantae
- Clade: Tracheophytes
- Clade: Angiosperms
- Clade: Eudicots
- Clade: Rosids
- Order: Brassicales
- Family: Brassicaceae
- Genus: Athysanus
- Species: A. pusillus

Binomial name
- Athysanus pusillus (Hook.) Greene

Synonyms
- Athysanus pusillus var. glabrior S.Watson; Thysanocarpus oblongifolius Nutt.; Thysanocarpus pusillus Hook.

= Athysanus pusillus =

Species of flowering plant

Athysanus pusillus, the common sandweed, is a species of flowering plant in the family Brassicaceae.

== Description ==
It is an annual herb with long, spindly stems on which grow small, unassuming white flowers. The tiny fruits that emerge from the flowers are flat, circular, green, and fringed with prominent white hairs. It may grow up to 15 cm tall and flowers between April–May.

== Distribution ==
It is native to the western United States and into British Columbia and Baja California.

== Habitat ==
Found in moist shallow soil along the slopes and cliffs in lower mountain zones.
