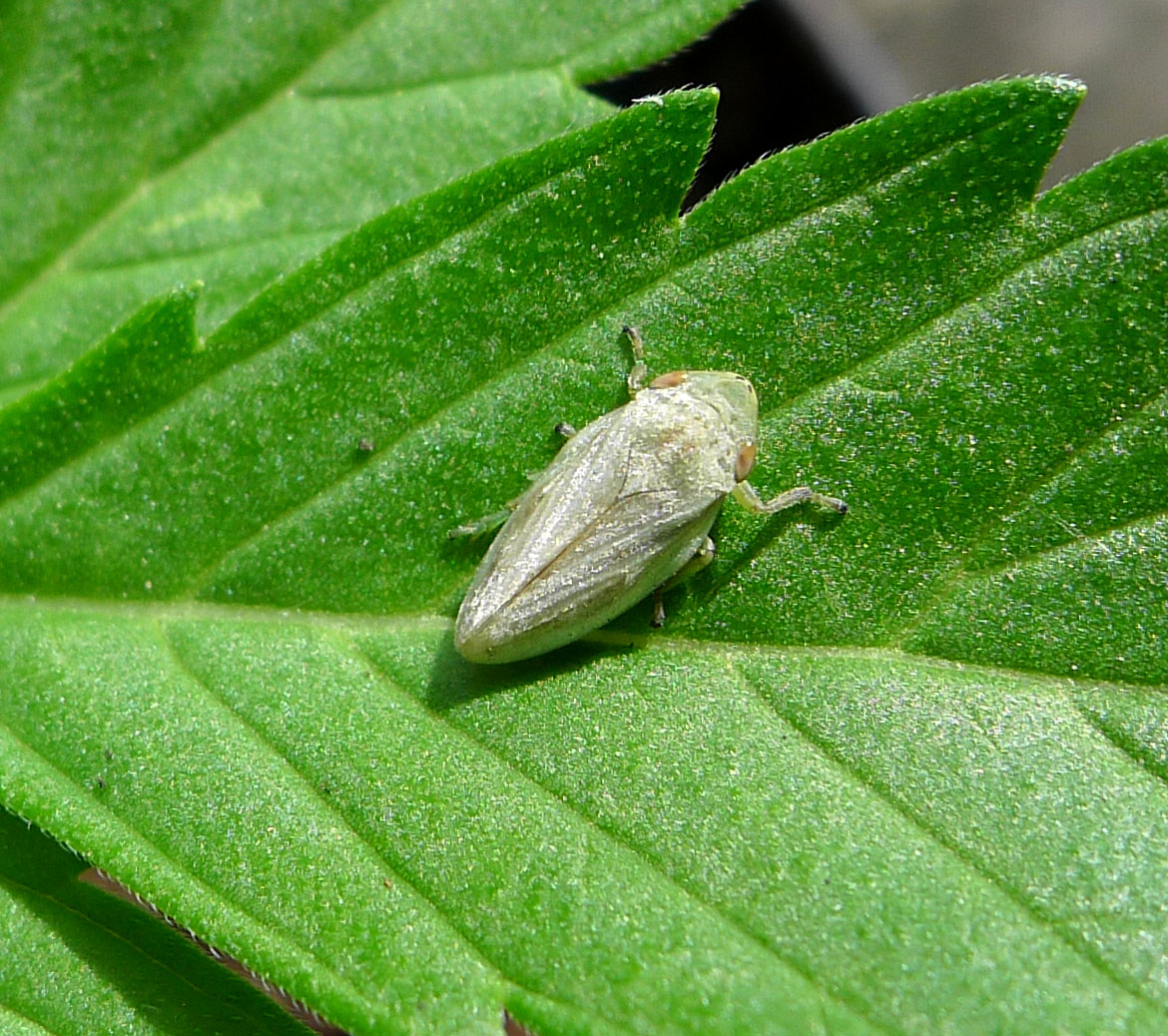
- Graphocraerus ventralis

Scientific classification
- Domain: Eukaryota
- Kingdom: Animalia
- Phylum: Arthropoda
- Class: Insecta
- Order: Hemiptera
- Suborder: Auchenorrhyncha
- Family: Cicadellidae
- Tribe: Athysanini
- Genus: Graphocraerus; Thomson, 1869

= Graphocraerus =

Genus of leafhoppers

Graphocraerus is a genus of leafhoppers in the family Cicadellidae. There are at least two described species in Graphocraerus.

== Species ==
These two species belong to the genus Graphocraerus:

- Graphocraerus montanus Dlabola 1994^{c g}
- Graphocraerus ventralis Fallén, 1806^{c g b}

Data sources: i = ITIS, c = Catalogue of Life, g = GBIF, b = Bugguide.net
