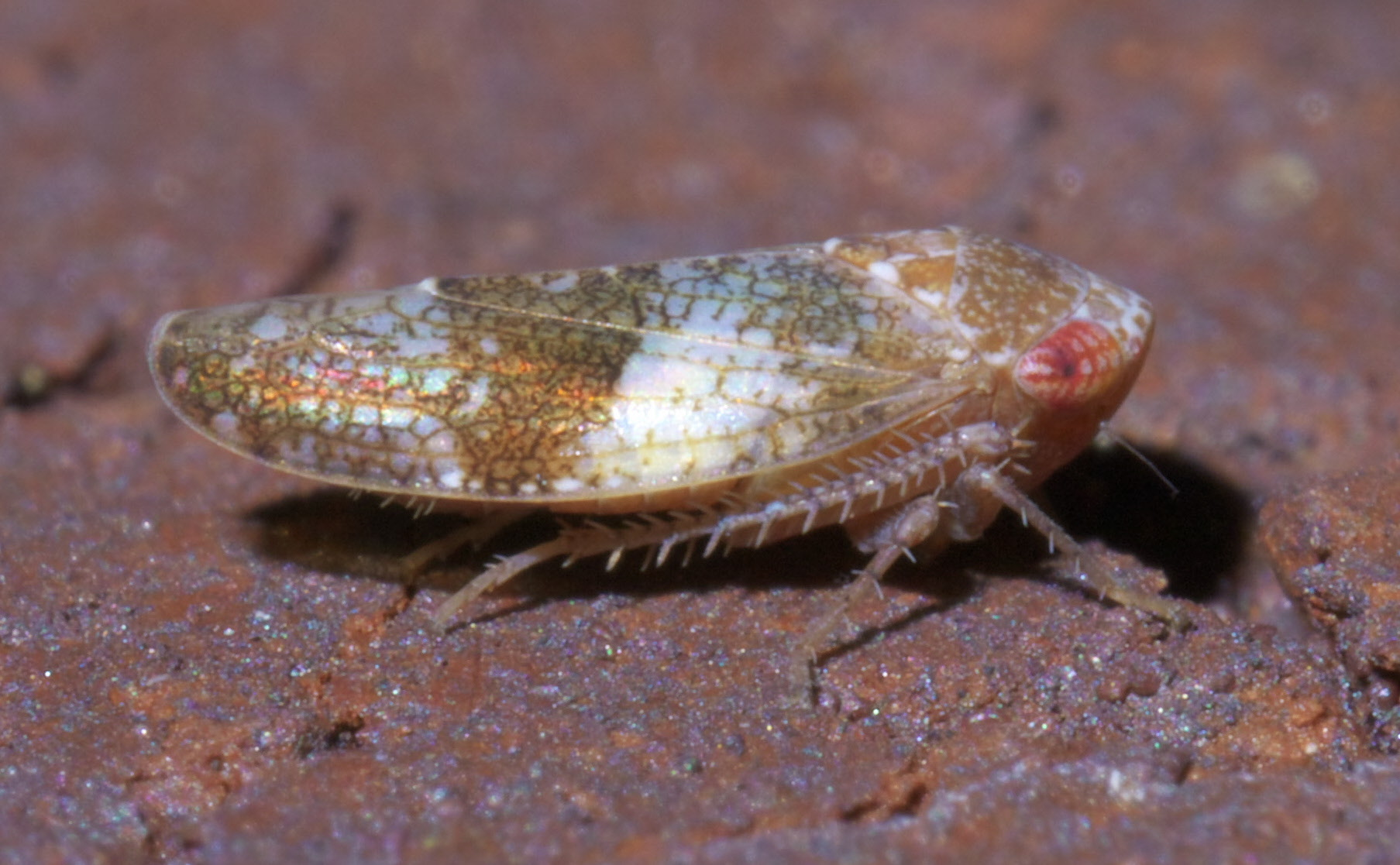
- Norvellina chenopodii

Scientific classification
- Domain: Eukaryota
- Kingdom: Animalia
- Phylum: Arthropoda
- Class: Insecta
- Order: Hemiptera
- Suborder: Auchenorrhyncha
- Family: Cicadellidae
- Tribe: Athysanini
- Genus: Norvellina; Ball, 1931

= Norvellina =

Genus of leafhoppers

Norvellina is a genus of leafhoppers in the family Cicadellidae. There are at least 30 described species in the genus Norvellina.

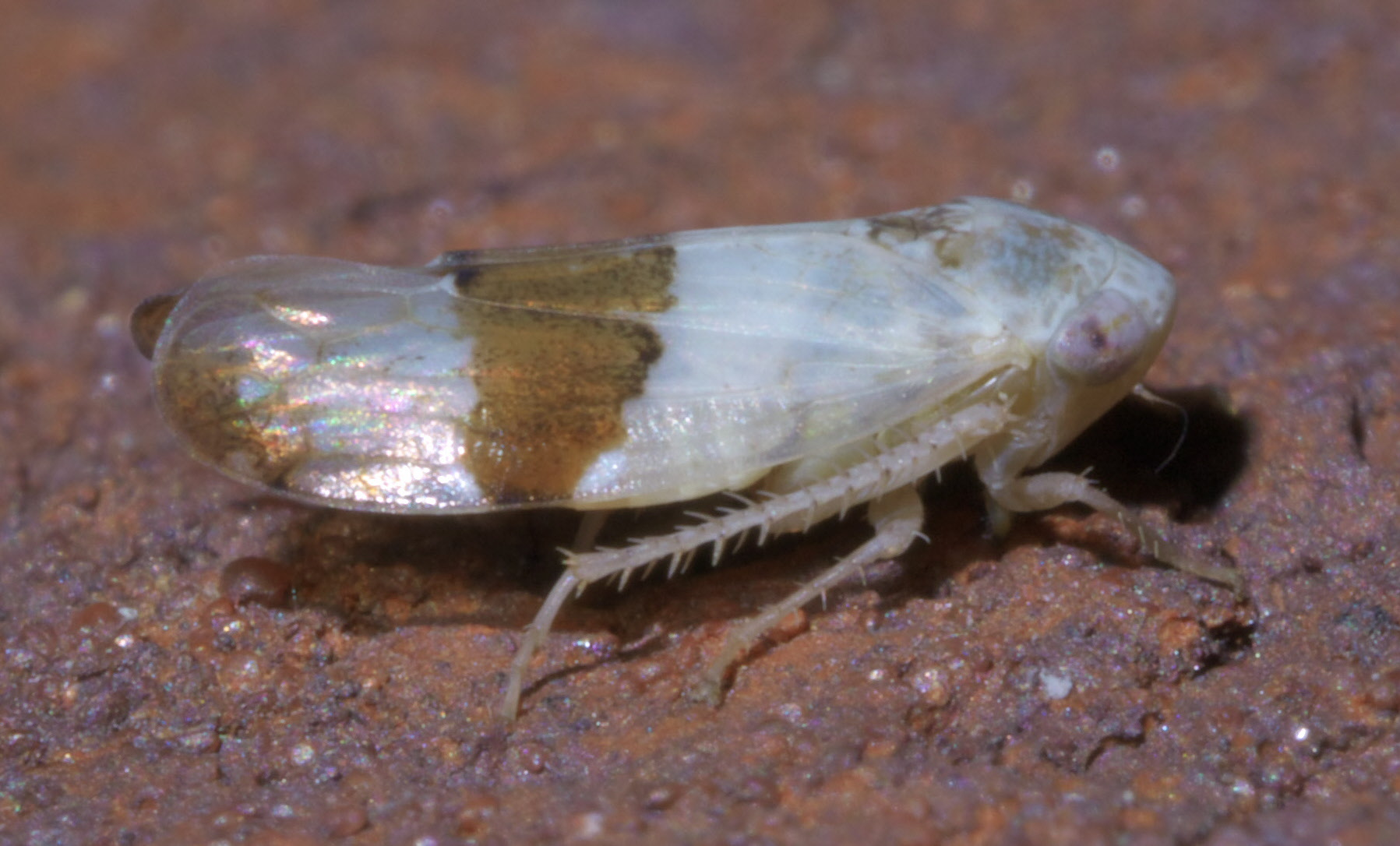
Norvellina seminuda

== Species ==
These 39 species belong to the genus Norvellina:

- Norvellina acuspina Kramer & DeLong 1969^{c g}
- Norvellina adunca Kramer & DeLong 1969^{c g}
- Norvellina apachana Ball 1931^{c g}
- Norvellina bicolorata Ball, 1905^{c g b}
- Norvellina chenopodii (Osborn, 1923)^{c g b}
- Norvellina cincta Kramer & DeLong 1969^{c g}
- Norvellina clarivida Van Duzee 1894^{c g}
- Norvellina columbiana (Ball, 1916)^{c g b}
- Norvellina curvata Lindsay 1938^{c g}
- Norvellina denotata Kramer & DeLong 1969^{c g}
- Norvellina excavata Lindsay 1938^{c g}
- Norvellina flavida Lindsay 1938^{c g}
- Norvellina forficata Kramer & DeLong 1969^{c g}
- Norvellina glauca Lindsay 1938^{c g}
- Norvellina helenae Ball 1931^{c g}
- Norvellina mildredae Ball 1901^{c g}
- Norvellina musarrati Ghauri 1987^{c g}
- Norvellina nevada Ball 1916^{c g}
- Norvellina novica Medler, 1943^{c g b}
- Norvellina numerosa Lindsay 1938^{c g}
- Norvellina pannosa Ball 1902^{c g}
- Norvellina perelegantis Ball, 1901^{c g b}
- Norvellina pulchella Baker 1896^{c g}
- Norvellina pullata Ball, 1901^{c g b}
- Norvellina recepta Kramer & DeLong 1969^{c g}
- Norvellina rostrata Lindsay 1938^{c g}
- Norvellina rubida (Ball, 1916)^{c g b}
- Norvellina saminai Ghauri 1987^{c g}
- Norvellina saucia Ball 1901^{c g}
- Norvellina scaber Osborn & Ball 1898^{c g}
- Norvellina scitula Ball 1901^{c g}
- Norvellina seminuda (Say, 1830)^{b}
- Norvellina seminudus Say 1830^{c g}
- Norvellina snowi Ball 1907^{c g}
- Norvellina spatulata DeLong 1980^{c g}
- Norvellina texana Ball 1907^{c g}
- Norvellina uncata Kramer & DeLong 1969^{c g}
- Norvellina varia Lindsay 1938^{c g}
- Norvellina vermiculata Lindsay 1938^{c g}

Data sources: i = ITIS, c = Catalogue of Life, g = GBIF, b = Bugguide.net
