= Grypotes =

Scientific classification
- Domain: Eukaryota
- Kingdom: Animalia
- Phylum: Arthropoda
- Class: Insecta
- Order: Hemiptera
- Suborder: Auchenorrhyncha
- Family: Cicadellidae
- Subfamily: Deltocephalinae
- Tribe: Koebeliini
- Subtribe: Grypotina
- Genus: Grypotes; Fieber, 1866
- Species: G. puncticollis

Binomial name
- Grypotes puncticollis (Herrich-Schäffer, 1834)

Genus of leafhoppers

Grypotes is a monotypic genus of leafhoppers. The only species is Grypotes puncticollis.
