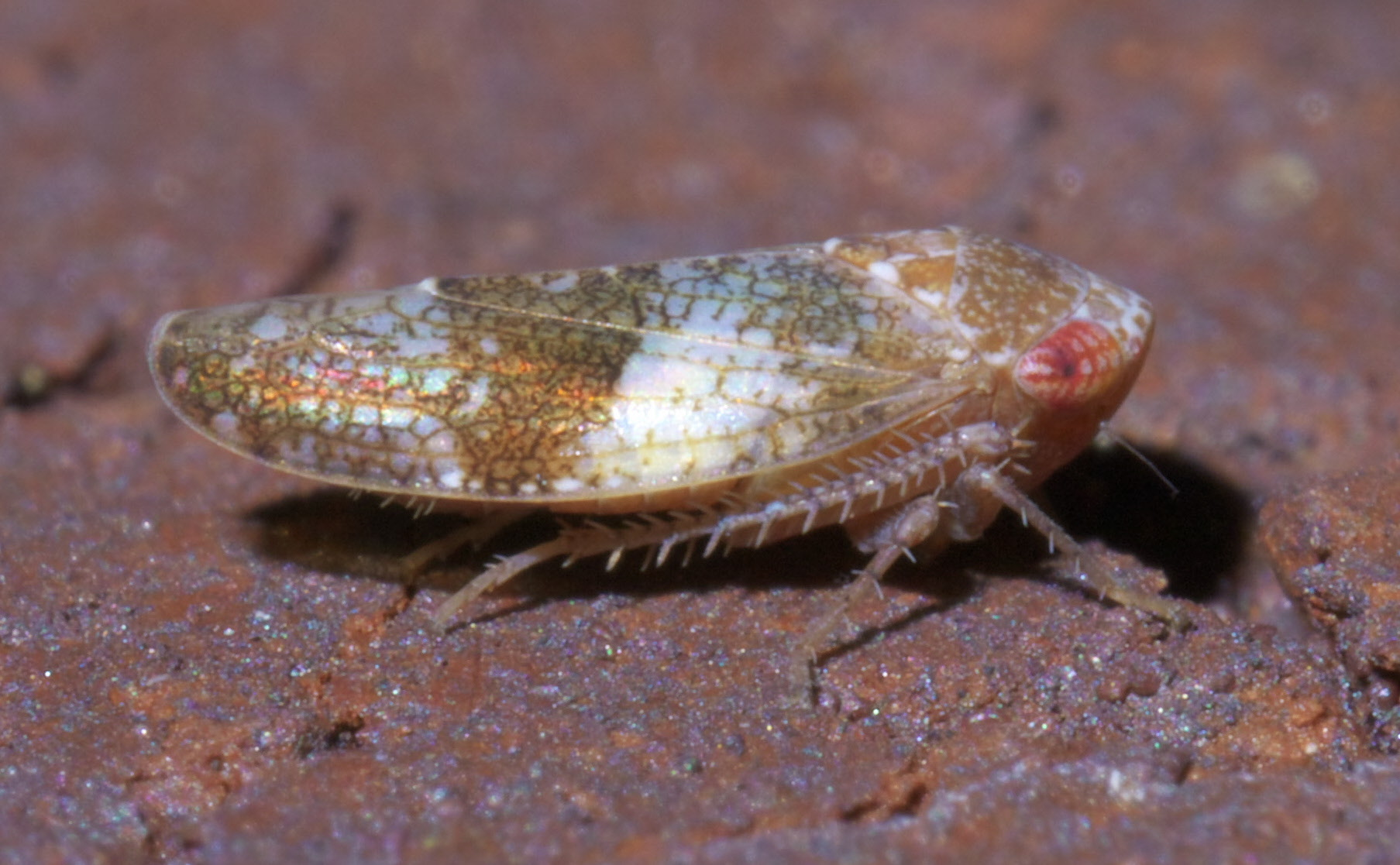

Scientific classification
- Domain: Eukaryota
- Kingdom: Animalia
- Phylum: Arthropoda
- Class: Insecta
- Order: Hemiptera
- Suborder: Auchenorrhyncha
- Family: Cicadellidae
- Genus: Norvellina
- Species: N. chenopodii

Binomial name
- Norvellina chenopodii (Osborn, 1923)

= Norvellina chenopodii =

Species of true bug

Norvellina chenopodii is a species of leafhopper in the family Cicadellidae.

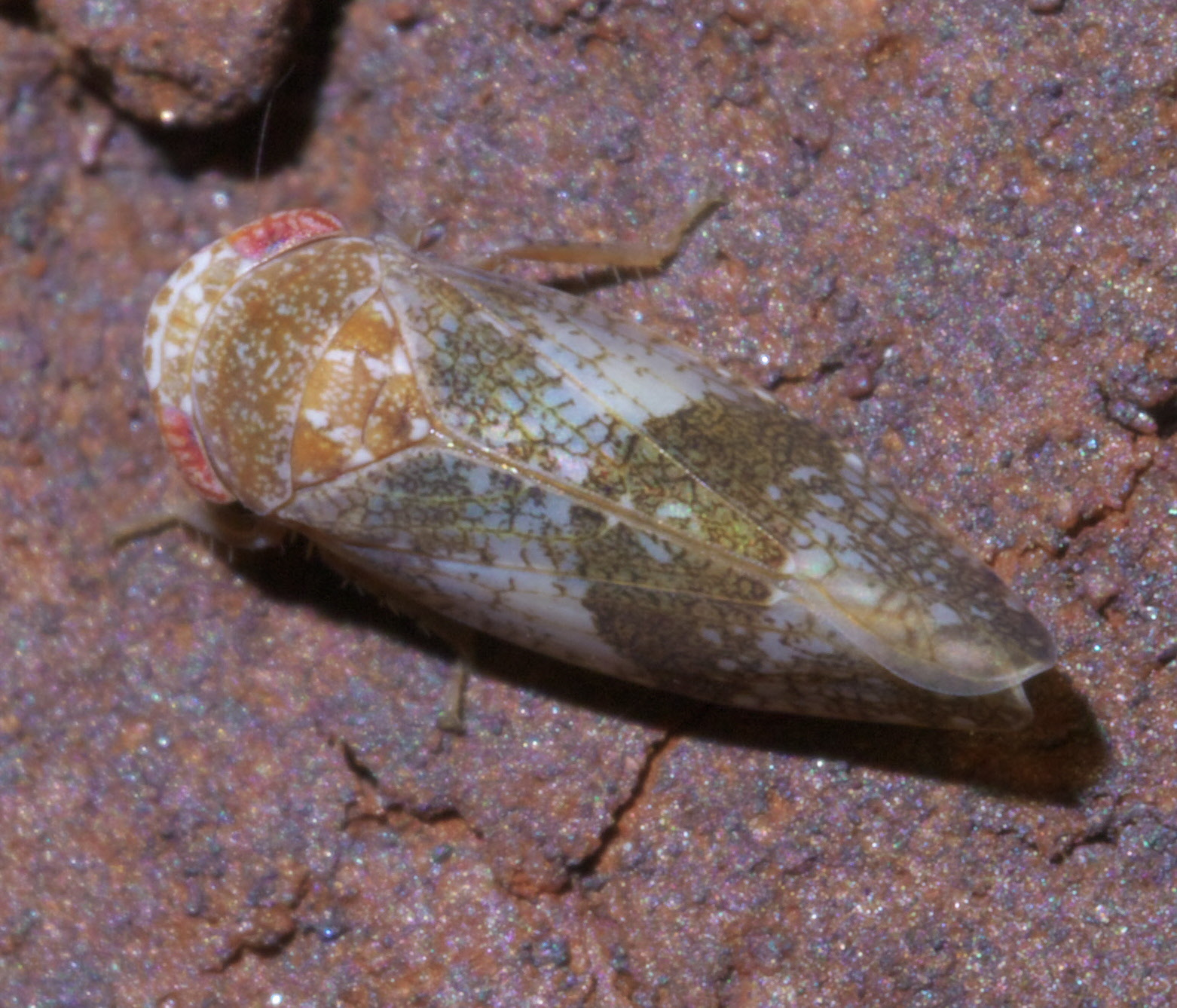
