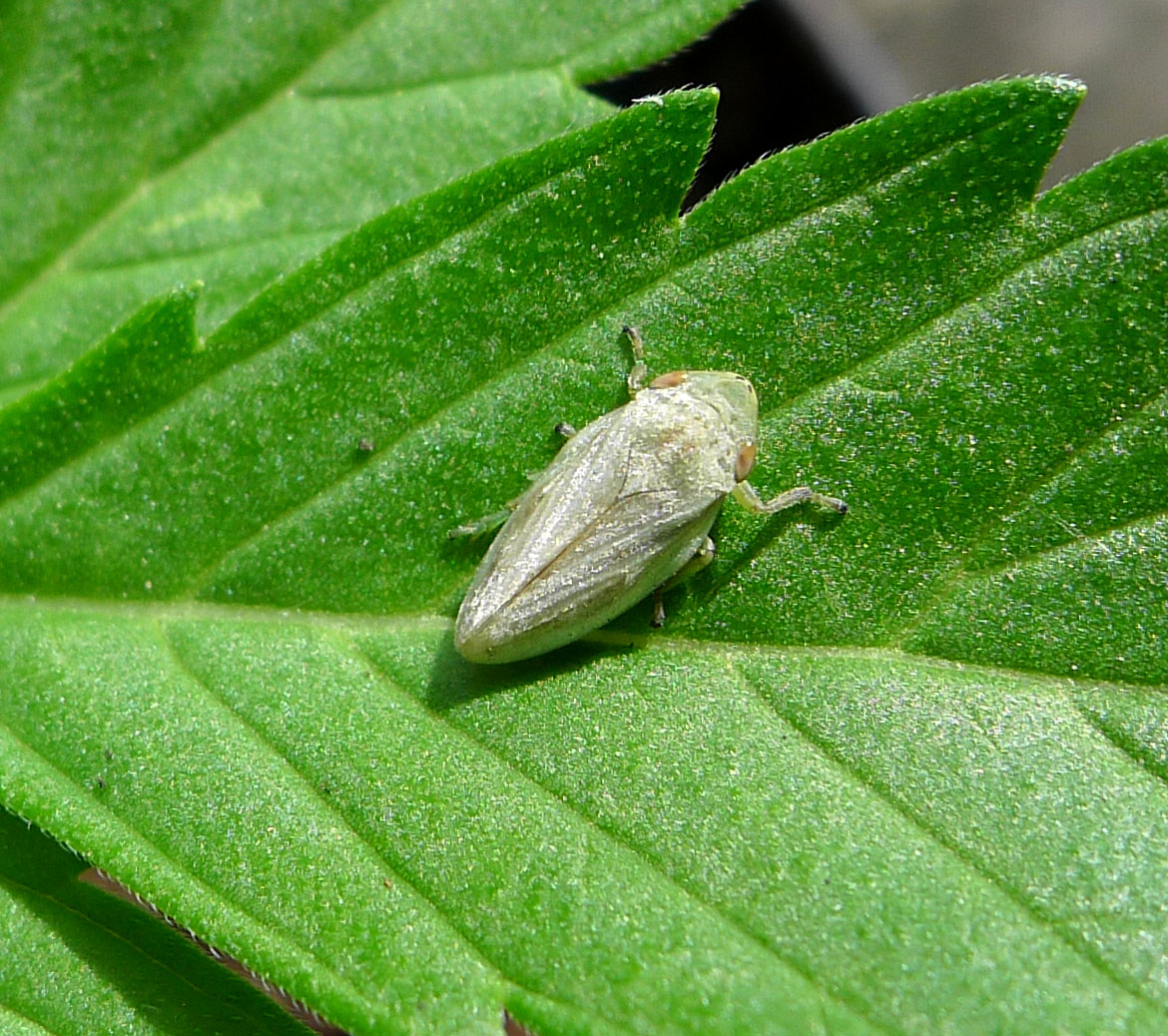

Scientific classification
- Domain: Eukaryota
- Kingdom: Animalia
- Phylum: Arthropoda
- Class: Insecta
- Order: Hemiptera
- Suborder: Auchenorrhyncha
- Family: Cicadellidae
- Genus: Graphocraerus
- Species: G. ventralis

Binomial name
- Graphocraerus ventralis Fallén, 1806

= Graphocraerus ventralis =

Species of true bug

Graphocraerus ventralis is a species of leafhopper in the family Cicadellidae.

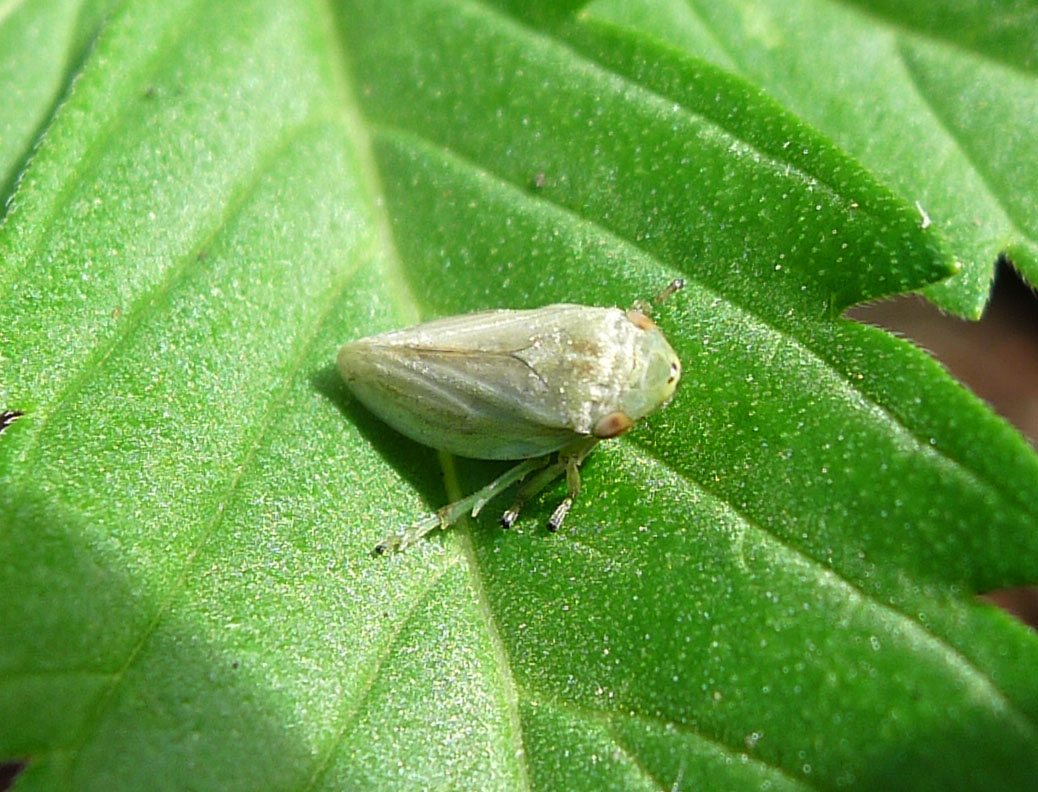

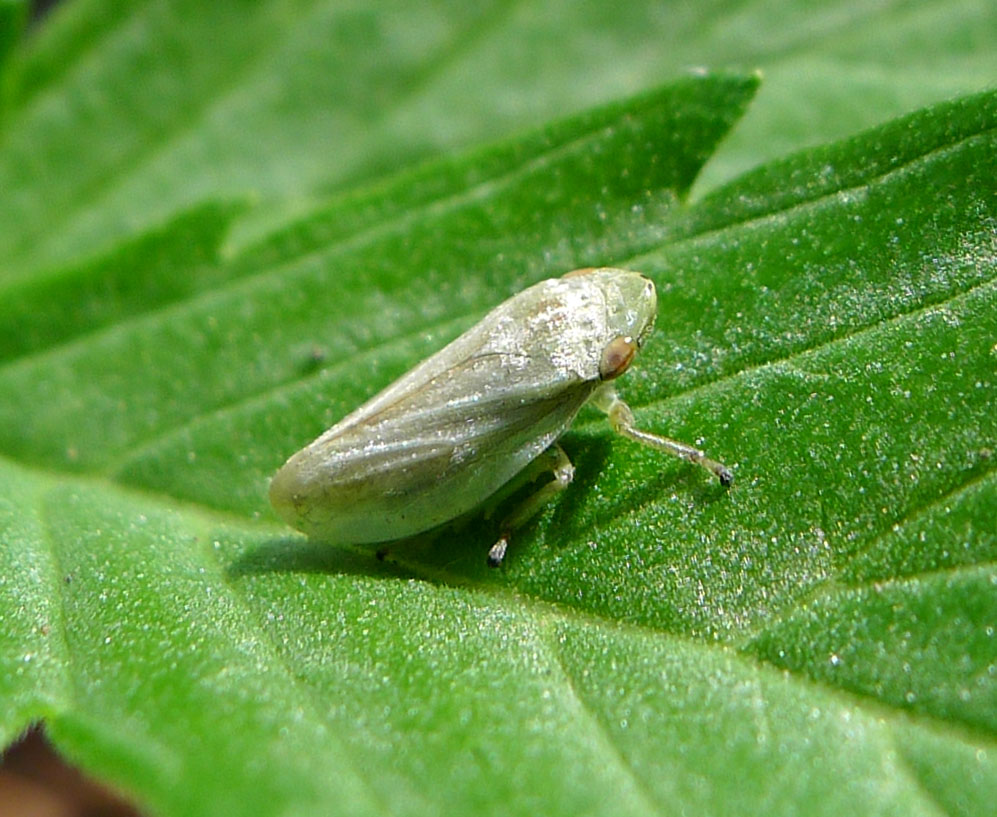
