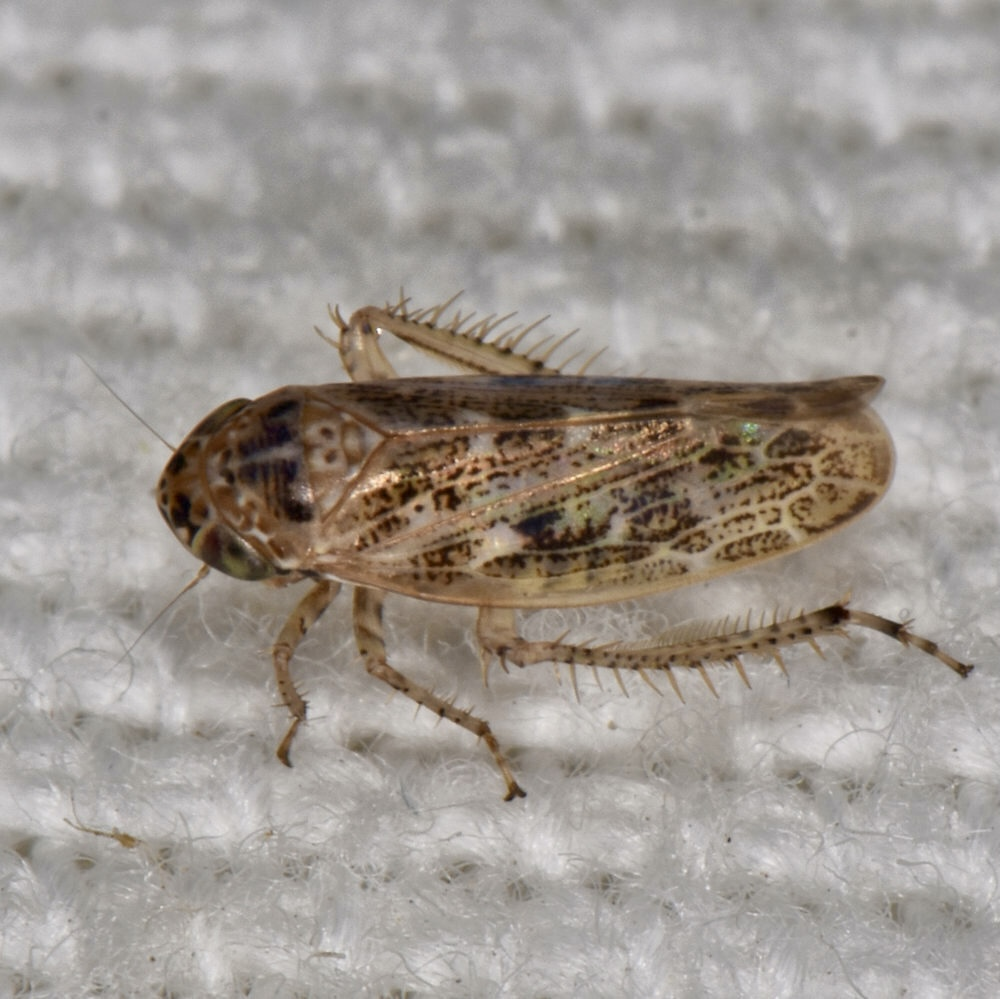
- Euscelidius variegatus, Waterloo, Ontario, 2022

Scientific classification
- Kingdom: Animalia
- Phylum: Arthropoda
- Class: Insecta
- Order: Hemiptera
- Suborder: Auchenorrhyncha
- Family: Cicadellidae
- Tribe: Athysanini
- Genus: Euscelidius; Ribaut, 1942

= Euscelidius =

Genus of leafhoppers

Euscelidius is a genus of leafhoppers.

== Taxonomy ==
Euscelidius contains the following species:

- Euscelidius schenckii
- Euscelidius spathulatus
- Euscelidius variegatus
