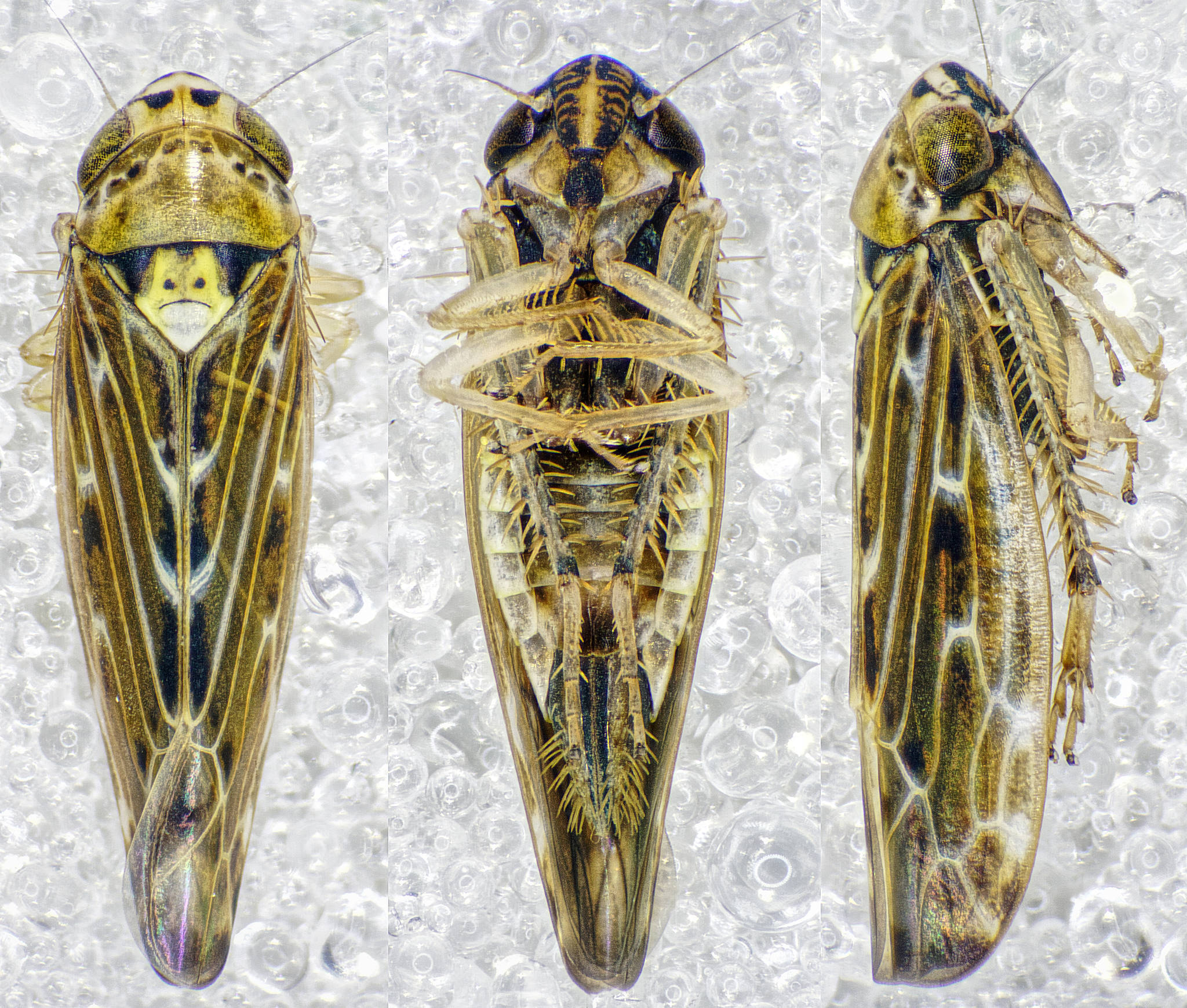
- Top, Bottom, and Side vide of Lamprotettix nitidulus

Scientific classification
- Domain: Eukaryota
- Kingdom: Animalia
- Phylum: Arthropoda
- Class: Insecta
- Order: Hemiptera
- Suborder: Auchenorrhyncha
- Family: Cicadellidae
- Tribe: Athysanini
- Genus: Lamprotettix; Ribaut, 1942

= Lamprotettix =

Genus of true bugs

Lamprotettix is a genus of true bugs belonging to the family Cicadellidae.

Species:

- Lamprotettix yunnanensis Dai, Shen & Zhang, 2003
