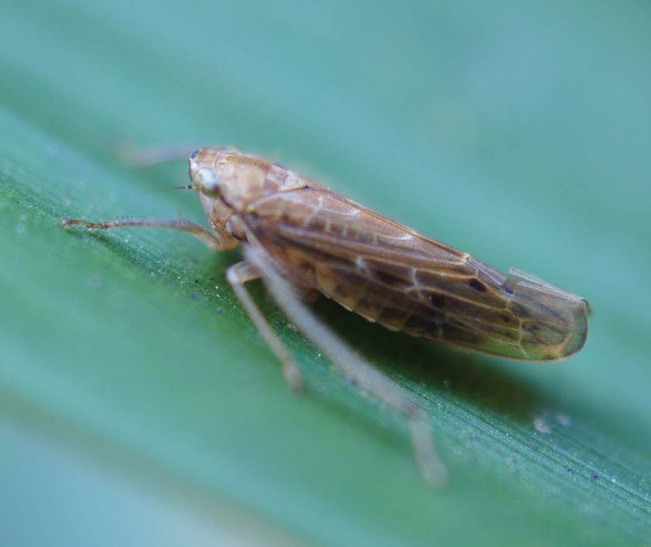

Scientific classification
- Kingdom: Animalia
- Phylum: Arthropoda
- Class: Insecta
- Order: Hemiptera
- Suborder: Auchenorrhyncha
- Family: Cicadellidae
- Tribe: Athysanini
- Genus: Abrus; Dai & Zhang, 2002

= Abrus (leafhopper) =

Genus of insects

Abrus is a genus of leafhoppers belonging to the family Cicadellidae.

== Description ==
Members of this genus feed on bamboo. The species of this genus are found in Eurasia and America.

== Taxonomy ==
Abrus contains the following species:

- Abrus anlongensis Chen, Yang, & Li, 2012
- Abrus bambusanus Chen, Yang, & Li, 2012
- Abrus bifurcatus Dai & Zhang, 2002
- Abrus biprocessus Li, 2011
- Abrus breviolus Dai & Zhang, 2008
- Abrus brevis Dai & Zhang, 2002
- Abrus concavelusLi & Wang, 2006
- Abrus coneus Dai & Zhang, 2002
- Abrus damingshanensis Xing & Li, 2014
- Abrus daozhenensis Chen, Yang, & Li, 2012
- Abrus digitatus Dietrich, Nguyen & Pham, 2020
- Abrus expansivus Xing & Li, 2014
- Abrus graciaedeagus Li, 2011
- Abrus hengshanensis Dai & Zhang, 2002
- Abrus huangi Dai & Zhang, 2002
- Abrus langshanensis Yang & Chen, 2013
- Abrus leigongshanesis Li & Wang, 2006
- Abrus wuyiensis Dai & Zhang, 2002
- Abrus xishuiensis Yang & Chen, 2013
- Abrus yunshanensis Chen, Yang, & Li, 2012
