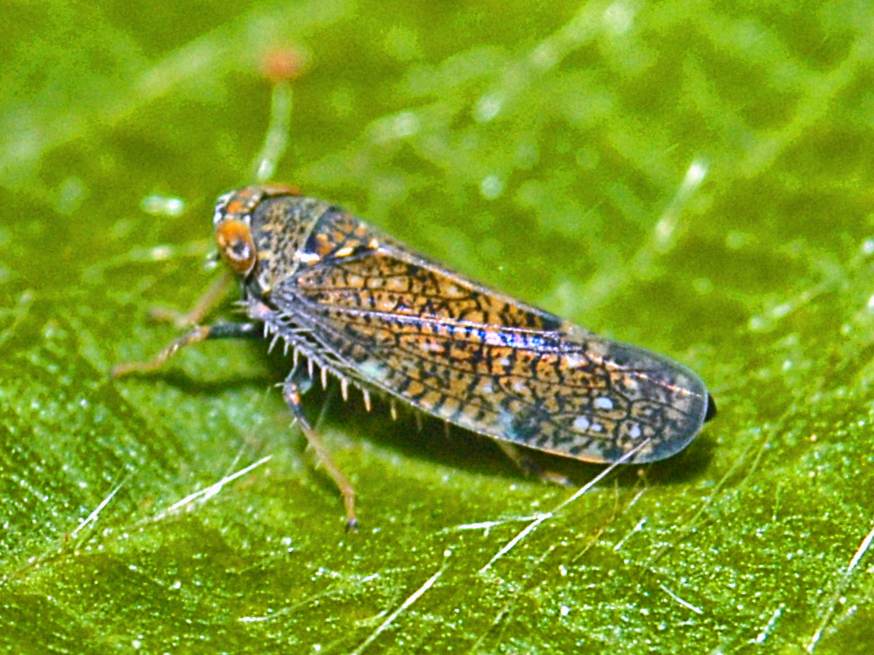
- Adult of Orientus ishidae

Scientific classification
- Domain: Eukaryota
- Kingdom: Animalia
- Phylum: Arthropoda
- Class: Insecta
- Order: Hemiptera
- Suborder: Auchenorrhyncha
- Family: Cicadellidae
- Subfamily: Deltocephalinae
- Tribe: Athysanini
- Genus: Orientus; DeLong, 1938

= Orientus =

Genus of true bugs

Orientus is a genus of leafhoppers belonging to the family Cicadellidae subfamily Deltocephalinae.

== Selected species ==
- Orientus amurensis Guglielmino, 2005
- Orientus ishidae (Matsumura, 1902) - Japanese leafhopper

== Bibliography ==
- A. Guglielmino Observations on the genus Orientus (Rhynchota Cicadomorpha Cicadellidae) and description of a new species: O. amurensis n. sp. from Russia (Amur Region and Maritime Territory) and China (Liaoning Province)
