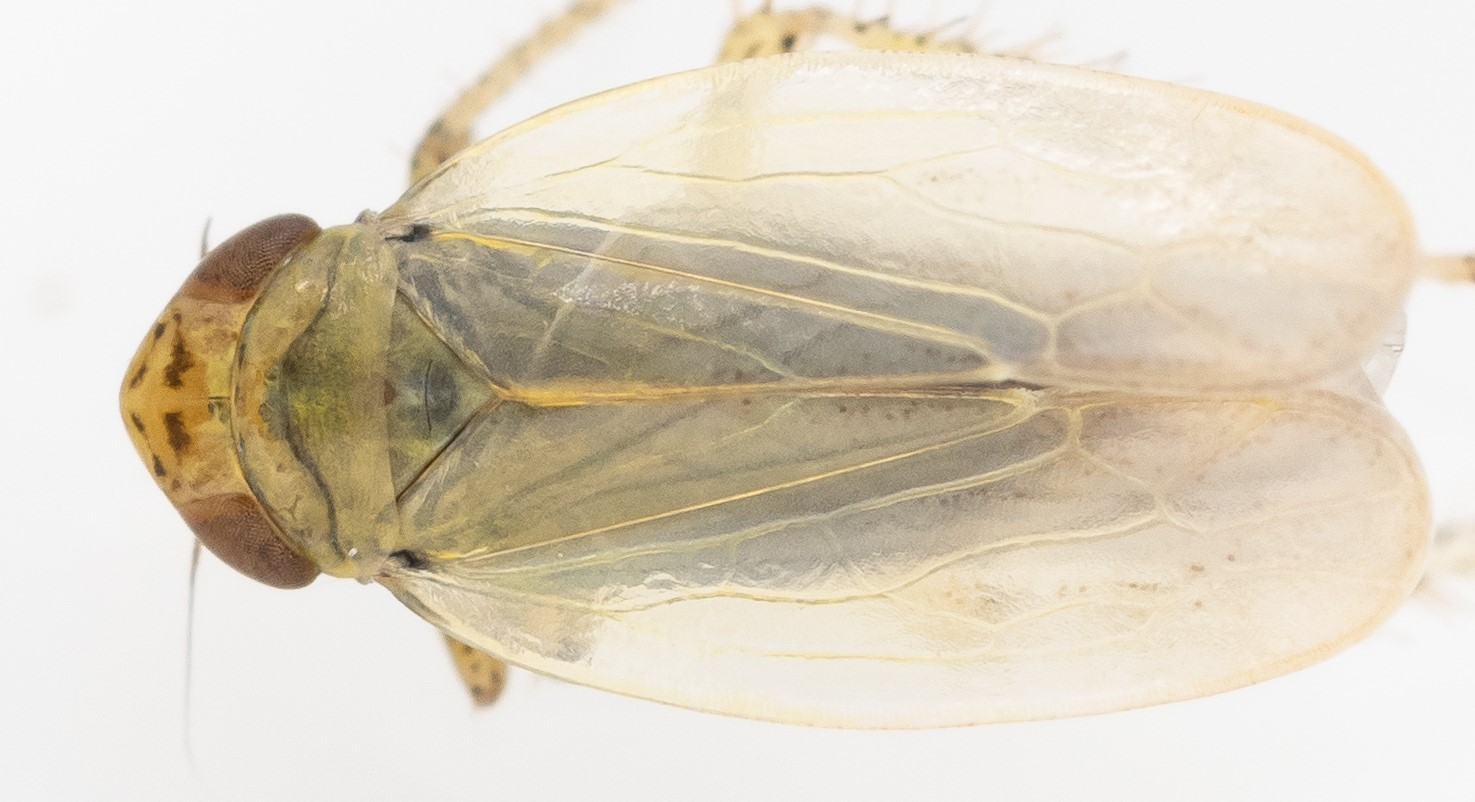

Scientific classification
- Kingdom: Animalia
- Phylum: Arthropoda
- Class: Insecta
- Order: Hemiptera
- Suborder: Auchenorrhyncha
- Family: Cicadellidae
- Genus: Doliotettix; Ribaut, 1942
- Species: D. lunulata

Binomial name
- Doliotettix lunulata Zetterstedt, 1840

= Doliotettix =

Doliotettix lunulata

Genus of true bugs

Doliotettix is a genus of true bugs in the family Cicadellidae. It is monotypic, being represented by the single species Doliotettix lunulata, and is found in northern Europe.
