= Allygidius =

Scientific classification
- Kingdom: Animalia
- Phylum: Arthropoda
- Class: Insecta
- Order: Hemiptera
- Suborder: Auchenorrhyncha
- Family: Cicadellidae
- Genus: Allygidius; Ribaut, 1948

Genus of insects

Allygidius is a genus of true bugs belonging to the family Cicadellidae.

The species of this genus are found in Europe and Northern America.

Species:

- Allygidius abbreviatus Lethierry, 1878
- Allygidius alanensis Gnezdilov, 1997
- Allygidius anatomarius Dlabola, 1980 - Greece
