= Hesium =

Scientific classification
- Domain: Eukaryota
- Kingdom: Animalia
- Phylum: Arthropoda
- Class: Insecta
- Order: Hemiptera
- Suborder: Auchenorrhyncha
- Family: Cicadellidae
- Genus: Hesium; Ribaut, 1942

Genus of true bugs

Hesium is a genus of true bugs belonging to the family Cicadellidae.

The species of this genus are found in Europe.

Species:

- Hesium domino (Reuter, 1880)
