= Athysanus (leafhopper) =

Scientific classification
- Kingdom: Animalia
- Phylum: Arthropoda
- Clade: Pancrustacea
- Class: Insecta
- Order: Hemiptera
- Suborder: Auchenorrhyncha
- Family: Cicadellidae
- Subfamily: Deltocephalinae
- Tribe: Athysanini
- Genus: Athysanus; Burmeister, 1838

Genus of leafhoppers

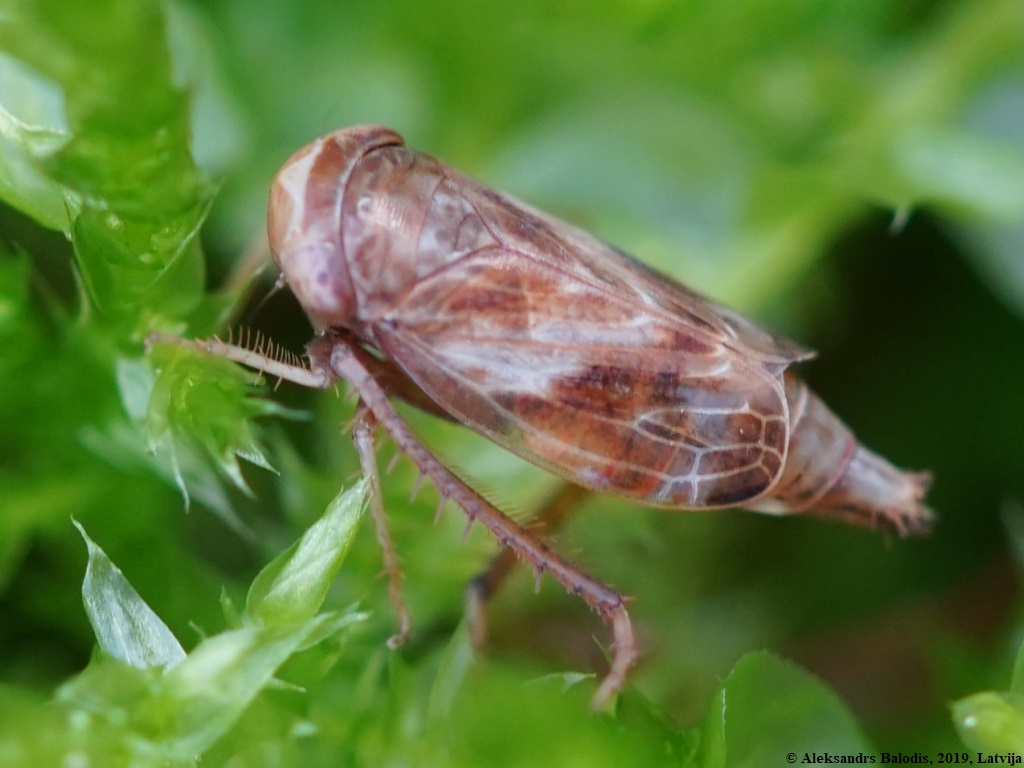
Athysanus quadrum

Athysanus is a genus of leafhoppers belonging to the family Cicadellidae.

== Descriptions ==
The species of this genus are found in Eurasia and America.

== Species ==
Athysanus contains the following species:

- Athysanus araucanus Berg, 1881
- Athysanus argentarius Metcalf, 1955
- Athysanus gestroi Lethierry, 1881
- Athysanus harrarensis Baker, 1925
- Athysanus jamianus Matsumura, 1940
- Athysanus kanoi Matsumura, 1940
- Athysanus ogasawarensis Matsumura, 1914
- Athysanus quadrum Boheman, 1845
- Athysanus schubotzi Melichar, 1912)
