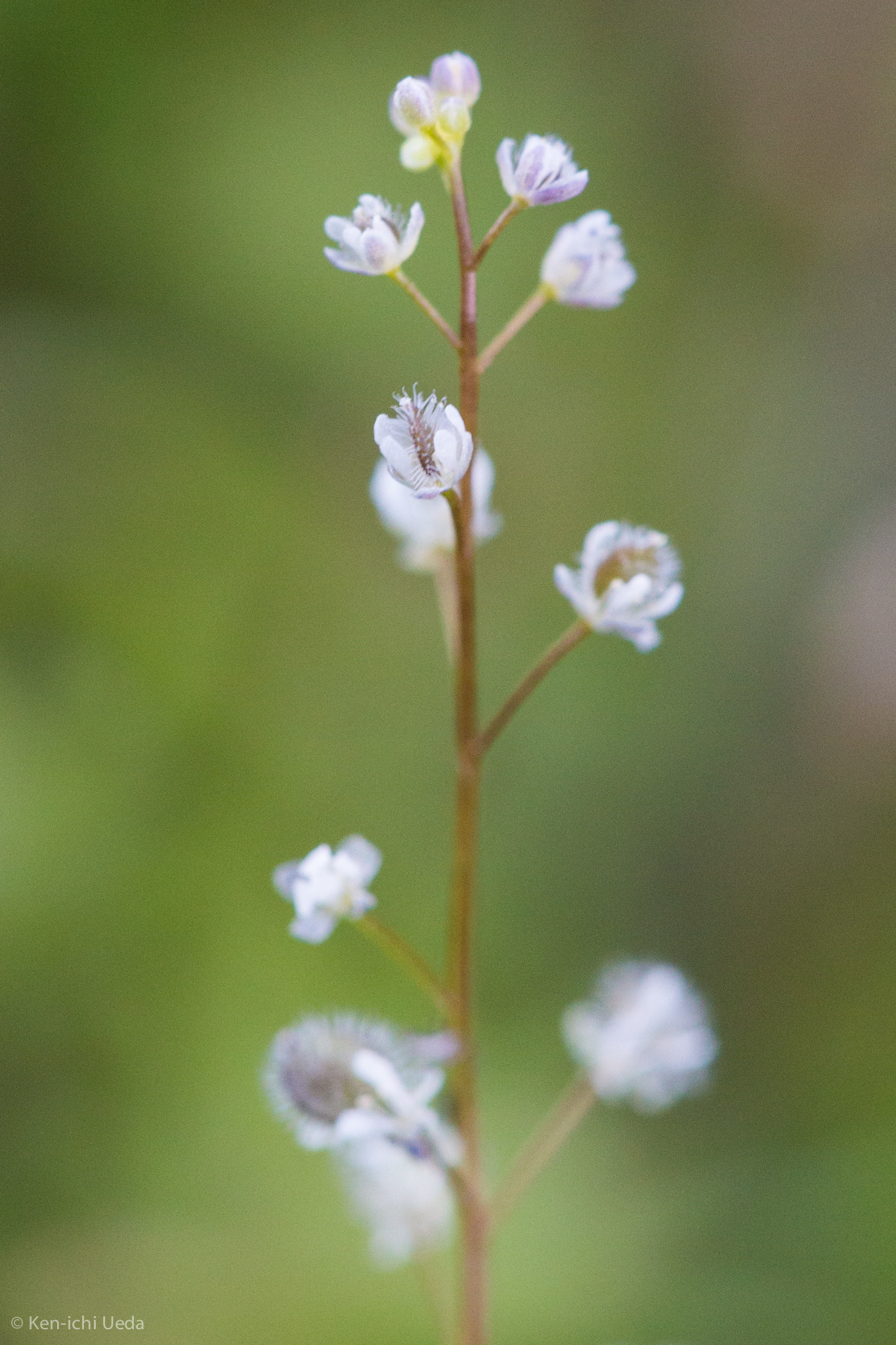
- Athysanus pusillus

Scientific classification
- Kingdom: Plantae
- Clade: Tracheophytes
- Clade: Angiosperms
- Clade: Eudicots
- Clade: Rosids
- Order: Brassicales
- Family: Brassicaceae
- Genus: Athysanus; Greene

Species
- Athysanus pusillus (Hook.) Greene; Athysanus unilateralis (M.E.Jones) Jeps.

Synonyms
- Heterodraba Greene

= Athysanus (plant) =

Genus of flowering plants

Athysanus is a genus of flowering plants in the family Brassicaceae. It includes two species native to western North America, ranging from British Columbia to Baja California.

- Athysanus pusillus (Hook.) Greene – Western Canada to Baja California
- Athysanus unilateralis (M.E.Jones) Jeps. – Oregon to northern Baja California
