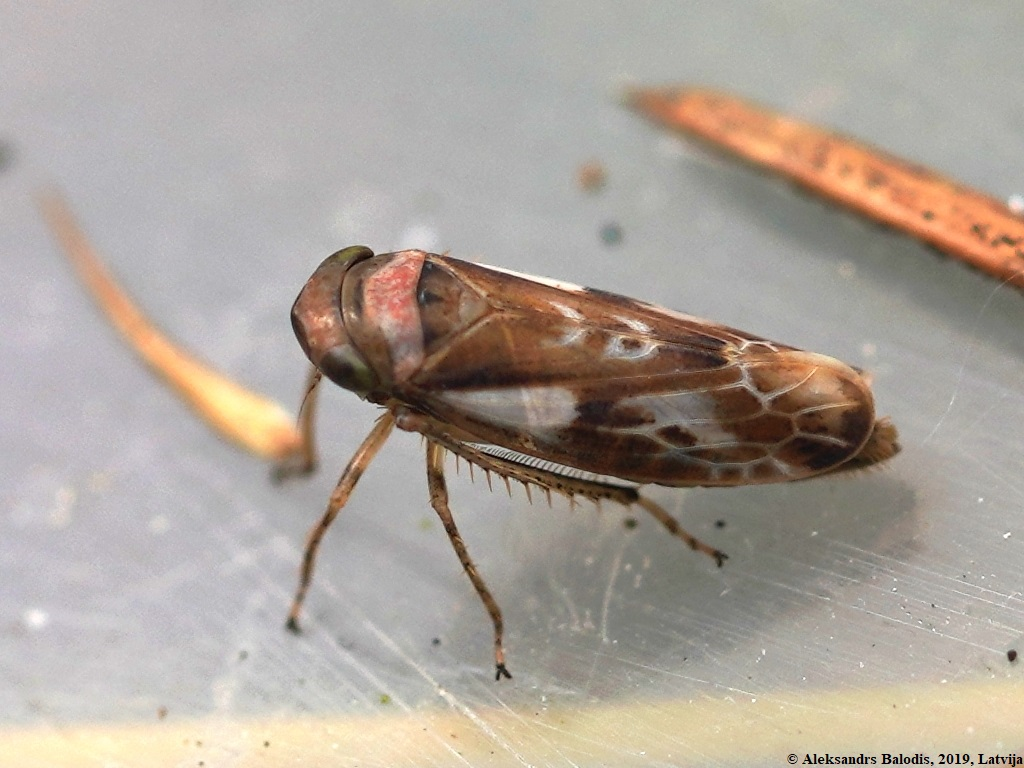
- Pithyotettix abietinus

Scientific classification
- Domain: Eukaryota
- Kingdom: Animalia
- Phylum: Arthropoda
- Class: Insecta
- Order: Hemiptera
- Suborder: Auchenorrhyncha
- Family: Cicadellidae
- Genus: Pithyotettix

= Pithyotettix =

Genus of true bugs

Pithyotettix is a genus of true bugs belonging to the family Cicadellidae.

The species of this genus are found in Europe.

Species:

- Pithyotettix abietinus Fallén, 1806
- Pithyotettix altaicus Vilbaste, 1965
