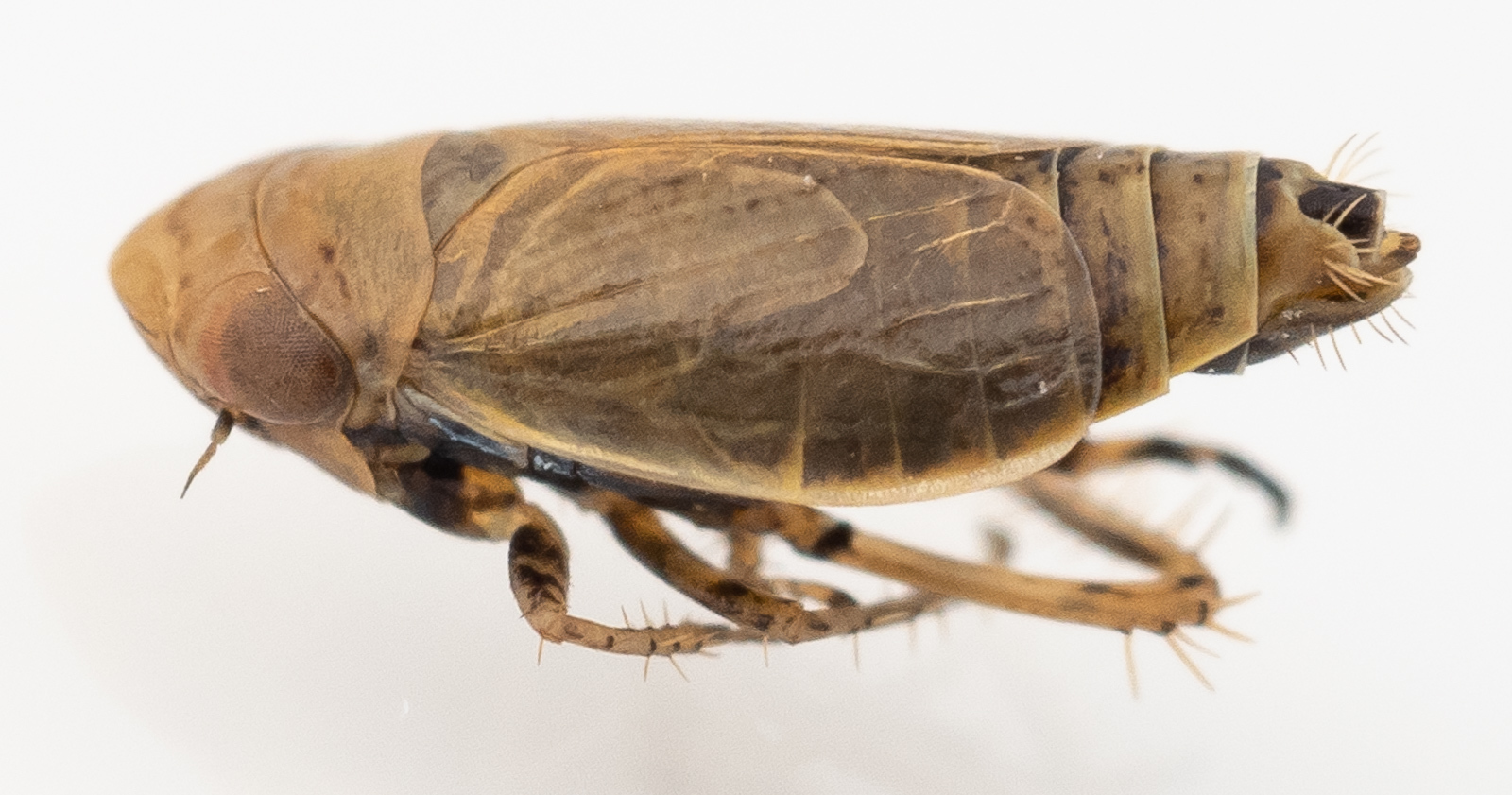
- Streptanus marginatus

Scientific classification
- Kingdom: Animalia
- Phylum: Arthropoda
- Class: Insecta
- Order: Hemiptera
- Suborder: Auchenorrhyncha
- Family: Cicadellidae
- Genus: Streptanus; Ribaut, 1942

= Streptanus =

Genus of true bugs

Streptanus is a genus of true bugs belonging to the family Cicadellidae.

The species of this genus are found in Europe and North America.

== Species ==
The following species are recognised in the genus Streptanus:

- Streptanus adenticus Dlabola, 1967
- Streptanus aemulans (Kirschbaum, 1868)
- Streptanus albanicus (Horváth, 1916)
- Streptanus arctous Emeljanov, 1964
- Streptanus bovinus Dlabola, 1967
- Streptanus confinis (Reuter, 1880)
- Streptanus debilis (Melichar, 1900)
- Streptanus dubitans (Melichar, 1900)
- Streptanus fulvidus Mitjaev, 1967
- Streptanus iliensis Mitjaev, 2000
- Streptanus josifovi Dlabola, 1957
- Streptanus marginatus (Kirschbaum, 1858)
- Streptanus nigrifrons Vilbaste, 1965
- Streptanus ogumae (Matsumura, 1911)
- Streptanus relativus (Gillette & Baker, 1895)
- Streptanus sordidus (Zetterstedt, 1828)
- Streptanus strejceki Dlabola, 1984
