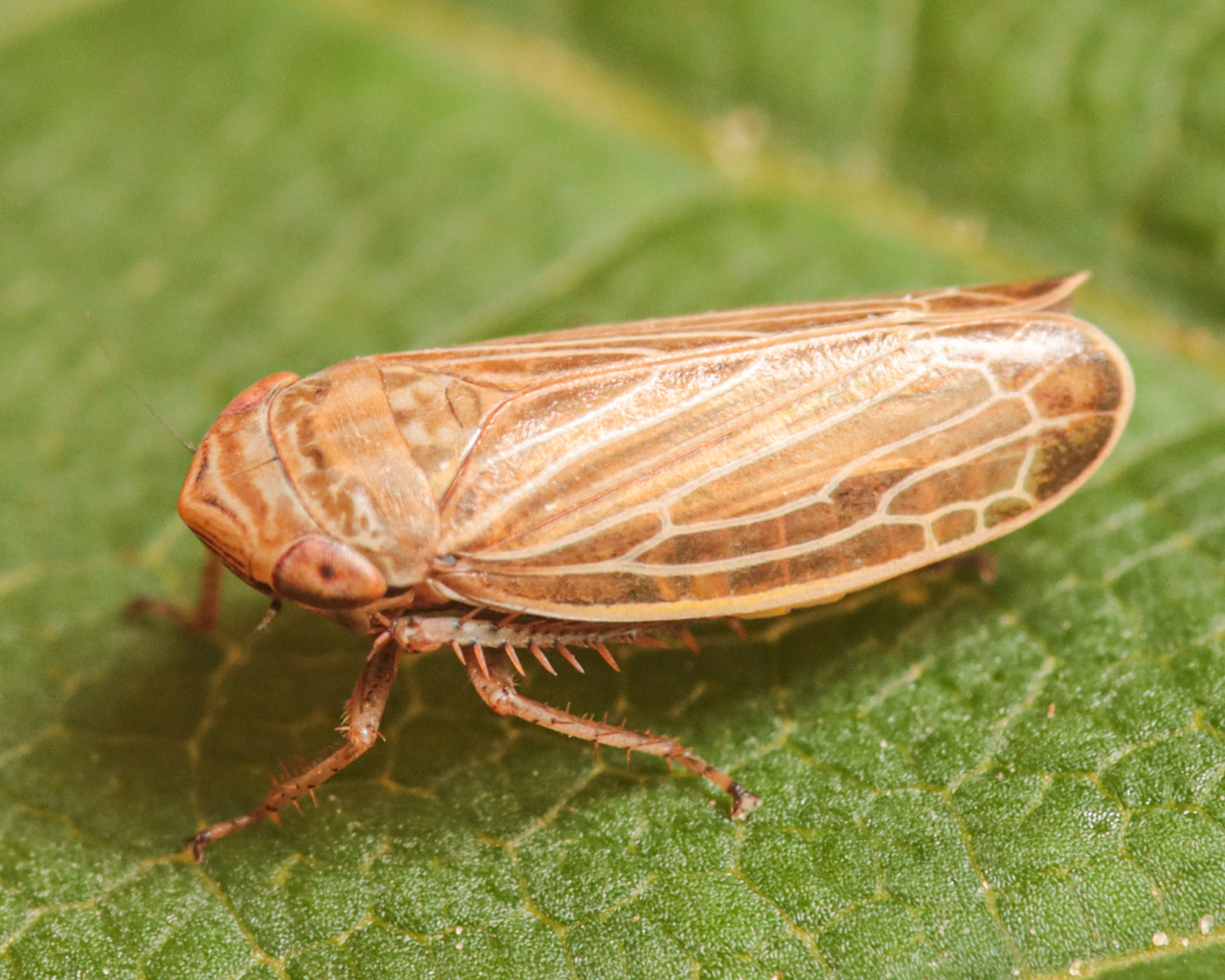

Scientific classification
- Kingdom: Animalia
- Phylum: Arthropoda
- Class: Insecta
- Order: Hemiptera
- Suborder: Auchenorrhyncha
- Family: Cicadellidae
- Genus: Macustus; Ribaut, 1942

= Macustus =

Genus of true bugs

Macustus is a genus of true bugs belonging to the family Cicadellidae. They are found in Europe and North America.

Species:

- Macustus grisescens Zetterstedt, 1828
