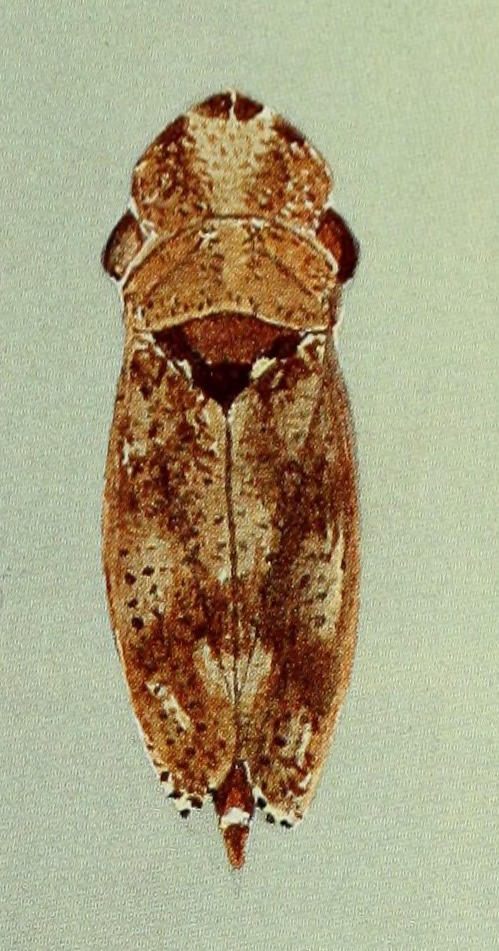
- Koebelia californica (overhead view)

Scientific classification
- Domain: Eukaryota
- Kingdom: Animalia
- Phylum: Arthropoda
- Class: Insecta
- Order: Hemiptera
- Suborder: Auchenorrhyncha
- Family: Cicadellidae
- Subfamily: Deltocephalinae
- Tribe: Koebeliini
- Subtribe: Koebeliina; Baker, 1897
- Genus: Koebelia; Baker, 1897

= Koebelia =

Genus of insects

Koebelia is a genus of leafhoppers endemic to western North America. Also called mottled pine leafhoppers, they are 3–5 mm long and are brown or gray with darker spots. The head is wider than the prothorax. They are found on pine trees.

== Species ==
These five species are in the genus Koebelia:

- Koebelia californica Baker, 1897
- Koebelia coronata Ball, 1909
- Koebelia grossa Ball, 1909
- Koebelia inyoensis Oman, 1971
- Koebelia irrorata Ball, 1909
