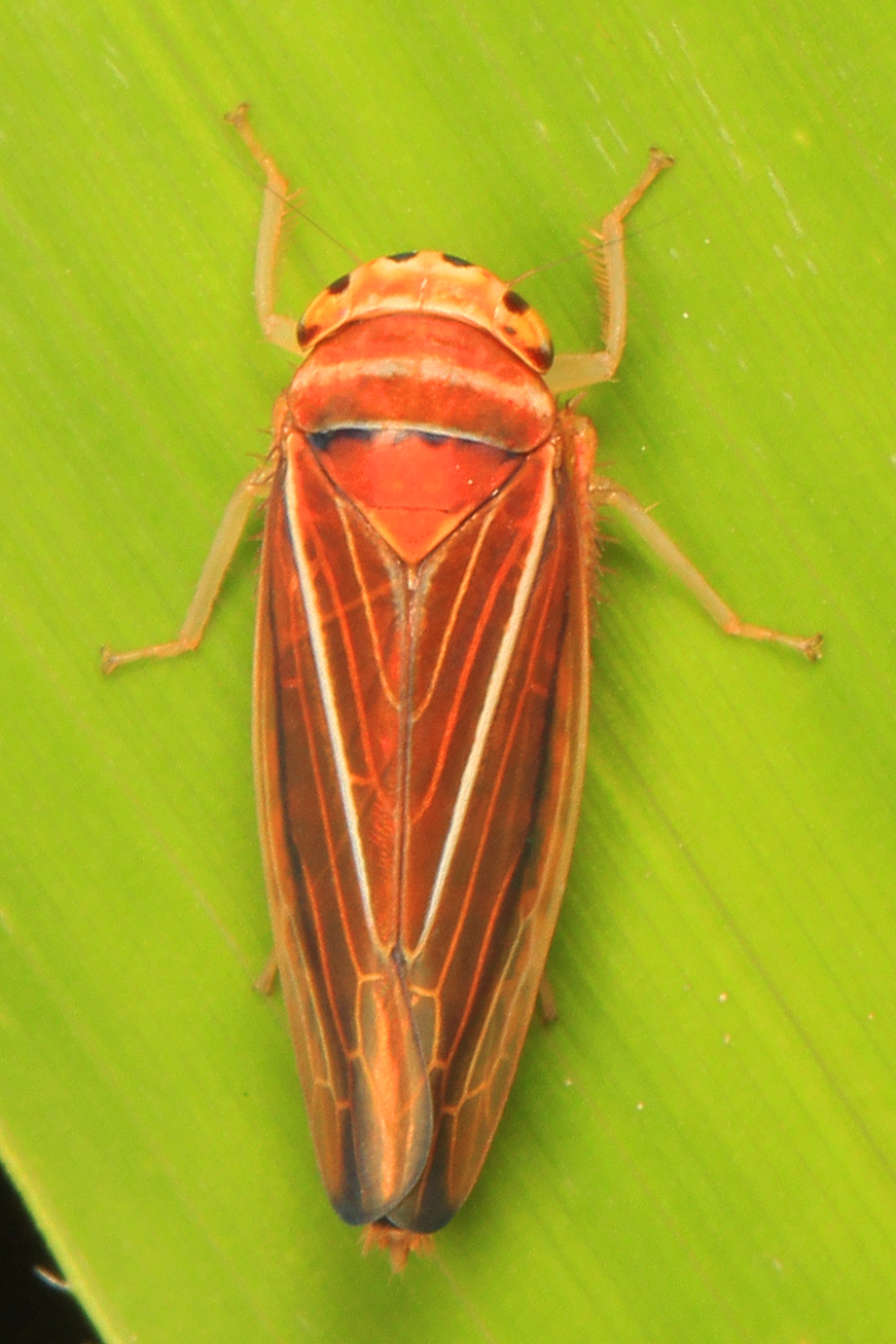

Scientific classification
- Domain: Eukaryota
- Kingdom: Animalia
- Phylum: Arthropoda
- Class: Insecta
- Order: Hemiptera
- Suborder: Auchenorrhyncha
- Family: Cicadellidae
- Genus: Idiodonus; Ball, 1936

= Idiodonus =

Genus of true bugs

Idiodonus is a genus of true bugs belonging to the family Cicadellidae.

The species of this genus are found in Europe and Northern America.

Species:

- Idiodonus acus
- Idiodonus albifrons
