= Eusama =

Scientific classification
- Kingdom: Animalia
- Phylum: Arthropoda
- Clade: Pancrustacea
- Class: Insecta
- Order: Hemiptera
- Suborder: Auchenorrhyncha
- Family: Cicadellidae
- Subfamily: Deltocephalinae
- Tribe: Platymetopiini
- Genus: Eusama; Oman, 1949
- Species: E. amanda

Binomial name
- Eusama amanda (Ball, 1909)

Genus of insect

Eusama is a monotypic genus of leafhopper. It was erected in 1949, elevating the novel species Eusama amanda that was first described by the scientist Elmer Darwin Ball in 1909.
