= Stictocoris =

Scientific classification
- Kingdom: Animalia
- Phylum: Arthropoda
- Class: Insecta
- Order: Hemiptera
- Suborder: Auchenorrhyncha
- Family: Cicadellidae
- Genus: Stictocoris; Thomson, 1869

Genus of true bugs

Stictocoris is a genus of true bugs belonging to the family Cicadellidae.

The species of this genus are found in Europe.

Species:

- Stictocoris hybneri Gmelin, 1789
- Stictocoris picturatus (C.Sahlberg, 1842)
