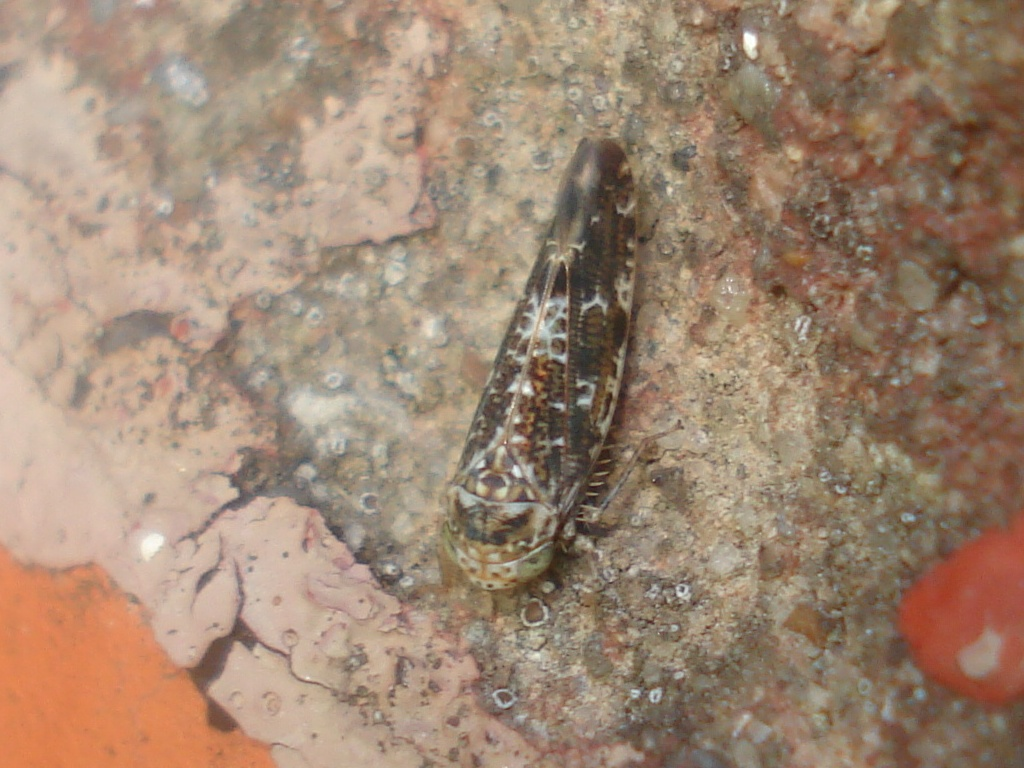
- Allygus mixtus

Scientific classification
- Domain: Eukaryota
- Kingdom: Animalia
- Phylum: Arthropoda
- Class: Insecta
- Order: Hemiptera
- Suborder: Auchenorrhyncha
- Family: Cicadellidae
- Genus: Allygus; Fieber, 1875

= Allygus =

Genus of true bugs

Allygus is a genus of true bugs belonging to the family Cicadellidae.

The genus was first described by Fieber in 1875.

The species of this genus are found in Europe and Northern America.

Species:

- Allygus mixtus
