= Cochlorhinina =

Scientific classification
- Kingdom: Animalia
- Phylum: Arthropoda
- Class: Insecta
- Order: Hemiptera
- Suborder: Auchenorrhyncha
- Family: Cicadellidae
- Tribe: Athysanini
- Subtribe: Cochlorhinina; Oman, 1943

Tribe of insects

Cochlorhinina is a subtribe of Leafhoppers in the tribe Athysanini and subfamily Deltocephalinae. The tribe is endemic to North America, however at least one species (Cochlorhinus pluto) has been introduced to Chile. Cochlorhinini contains 11 genera and over 140 species.

== Genera ==
There are 11 described genera of Cochlorhinini:

- Allygianus Ball, 1936
- Allygiella Oman, 1949
- Calonia Beamer, 1940
- Cochlorhinus Uhler, 1876
- Drionia Ball, 1915
- Eulonus Oman, 1949
- Gloridonus Ball, 1936
- Huleria Ball, 1902
- Limbanus Oman, 1949
- Pasadenus Ball, 1936
- Penehuleria Beamer, 1934
