= Drabescus =

Drabescus may refer to:

- Draviskos, a Greek village
- Drabescus (leafhopper), an insect genus in the subtribe Drabescina
