= Carvaka =

Scientific classification
- Kingdom: Animalia
- Phylum: Arthropoda
- Clade: Pancrustacea
- Class: Insecta
- Order: Hemiptera
- Suborder: Auchenorrhyncha
- Family: Cicadellidae
- Subfamily: Deltocephalinae
- Tribe: Scaphoideini
- Subtribe: Drabescina
- Genus: Carvaka; Distant, 1918

Synonyms
- Exitianiellus Evans, 1966

Genus of true bugs

Carvaka is a genus of African and Asian planthoppers in the subtribe Drabescina, erected by William Lucas Distant in 1918.

== Species ==
The World Auchenorrhyncha Database includes:

1. Carvaka bigeminata Cen & Cai, 2002
2. Carvaka clava Viraktamath, 1998
3. Carvaka compressa Viraktamath, 1998
4. Carvaka confusa Viraktamath, 1998
5. Carvaka contempta (Kirkaldy, 1906)
6. Carvaka dolens (Melichar, 1903)
7. Carvaka elegantula (Evans, 1966)
8. Carvaka elongata Viraktamath, 1998
9. Carvaka emeiensis Lu & Zhang, 2023
10. Carvaka flava Fletcher & Semeraro, 2007
11. Carvaka formosana (Matsumura, 1914)
12. Carvaka girijae Viraktamath, 1998
13. Carvaka jiangkouensis Lu & Zhang, 2023
14. Carvaka kumari Viraktamath, 1998
15. Carvaka maculata Fletcher & Semeraro, 2007
16. Carvaka modesta Distant, 1918
17. Carvaka mouldsorum Fletcher & Semeraro, 2007
18. Carvaka nielsoni Viraktamath, 1998
19. Carvaka ochrophara Distant, 1918
20. Carvaka picturata Distant, 1918 - type species
21. Carvaka pruthii Viraktamath, 1998
22. Carvaka sinuata Viraktamath, 1998
23. Carvaka synavei Viraktamath, 1998
24. Carvaka thoracica Distant, 1918
25. Carvaka wellingtoni Viraktamath, 1998
