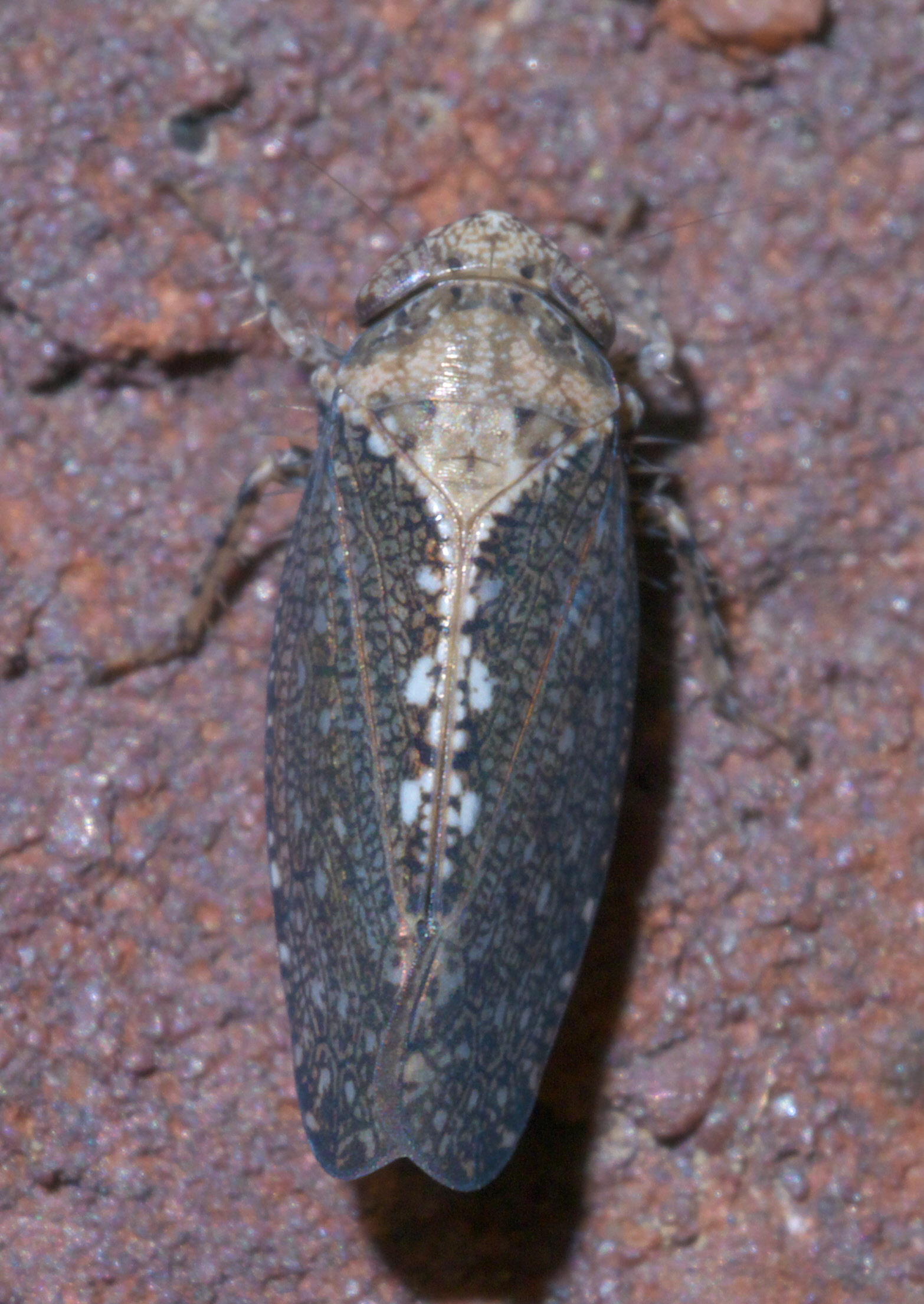
- Excultanus excultus

Scientific classification
- Kingdom: Animalia
- Phylum: Arthropoda
- Class: Insecta
- Order: Hemiptera
- Suborder: Auchenorrhyncha
- Family: Cicadellidae
- Subfamily: Deltocephalinae
- Tribe: Scaphoideini
- Tribe: Phlepsiina; Zahniser & Dietrich, 2013

Synonyms
- Phlepsiini Oman, 1943

= Phlepsiina =

Tribe of leafhoppers

Phlepsiina is a subtribe (previously a tribe) of leafhoppers in the Scaphoideini: subfamily Deltocephalinae. Genera of Phlepsiina have a fairly world-wide distribution.

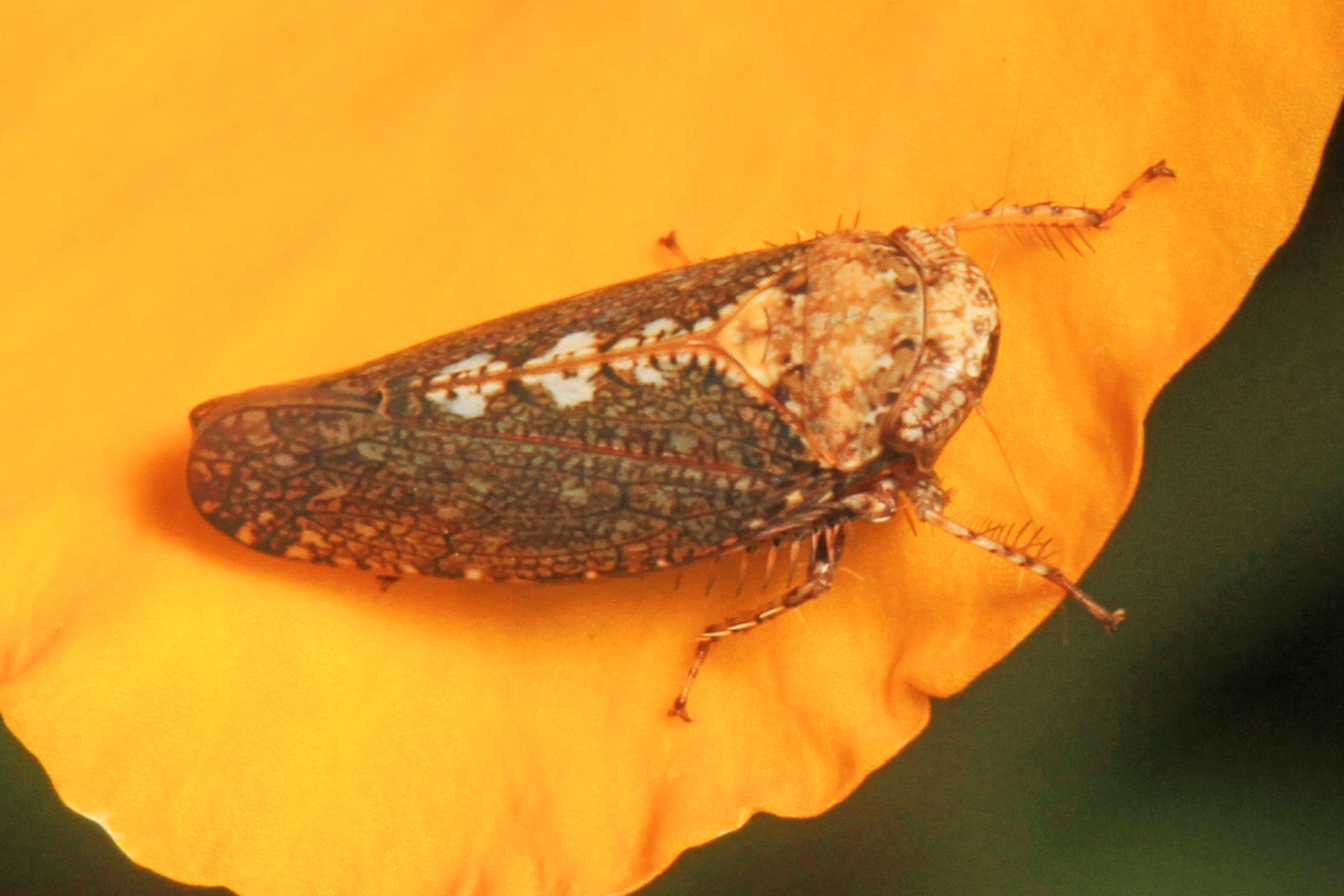
Texananus excultus

== Genera ==
The World Auchenorrhyncha Database includes:

1. Brevivalvala Dai, Qu & Yang, 2016
2. Excultanus Oman, 1949
3. Korana (leafhopper) Distant, 1910
4. Phlepsanus Oman, 1949
5. Phlepsius Fieber, 1866
6. Texananus Ball, 1918
