= List of Osbornellus species =

This is a list of 106 species in Osbornellus, a genus of leafhoppers in the family Cicadellidae.

== Osbornellus species ==
- Osbornellus aculeus DeLong & Martinson 1976^{c g}
- Osbornellus acuminatus DeLong 1942^{c g}
- Osbornellus affinis Osborn 1923^{c g}
- Osbornellus alatus Beamer, 1937^{c g b}
- Osbornellus alaudus DeLong 1942^{c g}
- Osbornellus albocinctus DeLong 1941^{c g}
- Osbornellus albolineus DeLong 1941^{c g}
- Osbornellus alveus DeLong & Martinson 1976^{c g}
- Osbornellus amplus DeLong 1982^{c g}
- Osbornellus angustatus DeLong 1976^{c g}
- Osbornellus anonae Linnavuori 1959^{c g}
- Osbornellus antlerus DeLong & Martinson 1976^{c g}
- Osbornellus appressus DeLong 1942^{c g}
- Osbornellus arabicus Dlabola 1987^{c g}
- Osbornellus arboropictus Dlabola 1984^{c g}
- Osbornellus arcus Freytag 2008^{c g}
- Osbornellus asperus DeLong & Martinson 1976^{c g}
- Osbornellus ater Beamer 1937^{c g}
- Osbornellus auronitens (Provancher, 1889)^{c g b}
- Osbornellus bellus Freytag 2008^{c g}
- Osbornellus bergi Metcalf 1955^{c g}
- Osbornellus bifasciatus Beamer 1937^{c g}
- Osbornellus bimarginatus DeLong 1923^{c g}
- Osbornellus blantoni Linnavuori 1959^{c g}
- Osbornellus borealis DeLong & Mohr, 1936^{c g b}
- Osbornellus brevitubus Freytag 2008^{c g}
- Osbornellus candaceae Zanol 2005^{c g}
- Osbornellus capitatus DeLong & Knull 1941^{c g}
- Osbornellus cibus DeLong & Martinson 1976^{c g}
- Osbornellus circulus DeLong & Martinson 1976^{c g}
- Osbornellus clarus Beamer, 1937^{c g b}
- Osbornellus coloritubus Freytag 2008^{c g}
- Osbornellus compressus Linnavuori 1959^{c g}
- Osbornellus concentricus DeLong 1942^{c g}
- Osbornellus consors (Uhler, 1889)^{c g b}
- Osbornellus corniger Beamer 1937^{c g}
- Osbornellus curvatus Beamer 1937^{c g}
- Osbornellus dabeki Ghauri 1980^{c g}
- Osbornellus decorus Beamer 1937^{c g}
- Osbornellus deviaticus Dlabola, 1974^{g}
- Osbornellus dicellus Freytag 2008^{c g}
- Osbornellus dicerus DeLong 1976^{c g}
- Osbornellus digitus DeLong & Martinson 1976^{c g}
- Osbornellus dipilus Freytag 2008^{c g}
- Osbornellus eccritus Freytag 2008^{c g}
- Osbornellus ecuadoricus Linnavuori 1959^{c g}
- Osbornellus eratus Freytag 2008^{c g}
- Osbornellus excavatus DeLong & Martinson 1976^{c g}
- Osbornellus fasciatus Metcalf 1954^{c g}
- Osbornellus filamenta DeLong & Beery 1937^{c g}
- Osbornellus fulvomaculatus Osborn 1923^{c g}
- Osbornellus fumidus Beamer 1937^{c g}
- Osbornellus furcillatus DeLong 1941^{c g}
- Osbornellus grandis DeLong 1942^{c g}
- Osbornellus hamatus DeLong & Martinson 1976^{c g}
- Osbornellus hispanus Freytag 2008^{c g}
- Osbornellus horvathi Matsumura 1908^{c g}
- Osbornellus hyalinus Osborn 1923^{c g}
- Osbornellus ignavus Ball 1936^{c g}
- Osbornellus infuscatus Linnavuori 1955^{c g}
- Osbornellus knulli DeLong & Beery 1937^{c g}
- Osbornellus lacunis DeLong & Martinson 1976^{c g}
- Osbornellus lamellaris Linnavuori 1959^{c g}
- Osbornellus libratus DeLong 1941^{c g}
- Osbornellus limosus DeLong, 1941^{c g b}
- Osbornellus lineatus Beamer 1937^{c g}
- Osbornellus lunus DeLong 1976^{c g}
- Osbornellus macchiae Lindberg 1948^{c g}
- Osbornellus mexicanus Osborn 1900^{c g}
- Osbornellus nigrocinctus DeLong 1942^{c g}
- Osbornellus omani Beamer 1937^{c g}
- Osbornellus pallidus Beamer 1937^{c g}
- Osbornellus pandus DeLong 1941^{c g}
- Osbornellus parallelus DeLong & Knull 1941^{c g}
- Osbornellus parvus Freytag 2008^{c g}
- Osbornellus proximus Freytag 2008^{c g}
- Osbornellus puniceus DeLong 1941^{c g}
- Osbornellus rarus DeLong 1941^{c g}
- Osbornellus remotus DeLong & Martinson 1976^{c g}
- Osbornellus respublicanus Berg 1879^{c g}
- Osbornellus reversus DeLong 1942^{c g}
- Osbornellus ritanus Ball 1932^{c g}
- Osbornellus rostratus DeLong 1982^{c g}
- Osbornellus rotundus Beamer, 1937^{c g b}
- Osbornellus rubellus DeLong 1941^{c g}
- Osbornellus rurrens DeLong 1941^{c g}
- Osbornellus sagarus Freytag 2008^{c g}
- Osbornellus salsus DeLong 1942^{c g}
- Osbornellus sanderanus Dlabola 1987^{c g}
- Osbornellus scalaris (Van Duzee, 1890)^{c g b}
- Osbornellus separatus DeLong 1942^{c g}
- Osbornellus spicatus Beamer 1937^{c g}
- Osbornellus spinellus DeLong & Martinson 1976^{c g}
- Osbornellus spiniloba Linnavuori & Heller 1961^{c g}
- Osbornellus spinosus DeLong 1942^{c g}
- Osbornellus tenuis Beamer 1937^{c g}
- Osbornellus tetrus Freytag 2008^{c g}
- Osbornellus torresicus Dlabola 1967^{c g}
- Osbornellus trifrustrus DeLong & Martinson 1976^{c g}
- Osbornellus trimaculatus DeLong 1942^{c g}
- Osbornellus tripartitus DeLong 1941^{c g}
- Osbornellus tubus Freytag 2008^{c g}
- Osbornellus tumidus DeLong 1942^{c g}
- Osbornellus unicolor Osborn, 1900^{c g b}
- Osbornellus venustus Freytag 2008^{c g}
- Osbornellus vicinus Linnavuori & Heller 1961^{c g}

Data sources: i = ITIS, c = Catalogue of Life, g = GBIF, b = Bugguide.net
