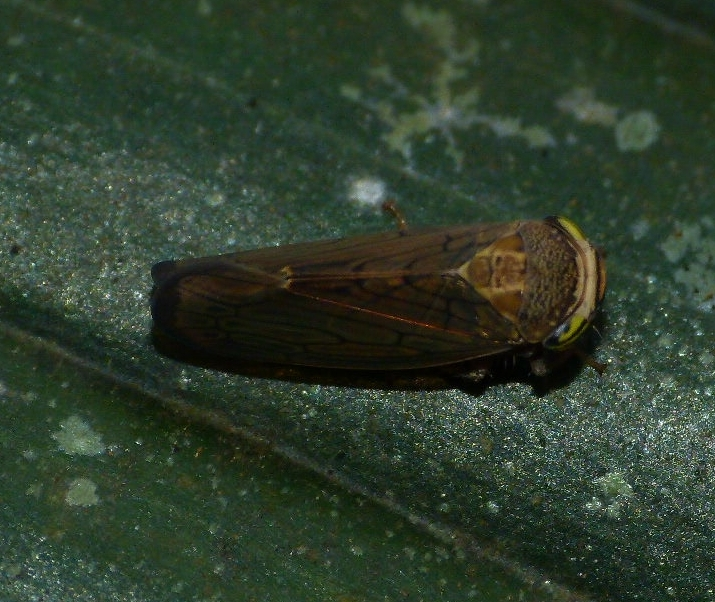
- Kutara striata

Scientific classification
- Kingdom: Animalia
- Phylum: Arthropoda
- Class: Insecta
- Order: Hemiptera
- Suborder: Auchenorrhyncha
- Family: Cicadellidae
- Subtribe: Drabescina
- Genus: Kutara; Distant, 1908

Species
- Kutara brunnescens; Kutara costalis; Kutara grisescens; Kutara lucidicosta; Kutara nigrifasciata; Kutara producta; Kutara sinensis; Kutara transversa; Kutara striata

= Kutara =

Genus of true bugs

Kutara is a leafhopper genus belonging to the tribe Scaphoideini and subfamily Deltocephalinae. It was previously assigned to the Selenocephalinae subfamily.
