= Isaca =

Scientific classification
- Kingdom: Animalia
- Phylum: Arthropoda
- Class: Insecta
- Order: Hemiptera
- Suborder: Auchenorrhyncha
- Family: Cicadellidae
- Subfamily: Deltocephalinae
- Tribe: Scaphoideini
- Subtribe: Drabescina
- Genus: Isaca; Walker, 1857

Genus of insects

Isaca is a genus of Malesian planthoppers in the subtribe Drabescina, erected by Francis Walker in 1857.

== Species ==
The World Auchenorrhyncha Database includes:

- Isaca bipars Walker, 1857
- Isaca falcata Zhang & Webb, 1996
- Isaca sinuata Zhang & Webb, 1996
