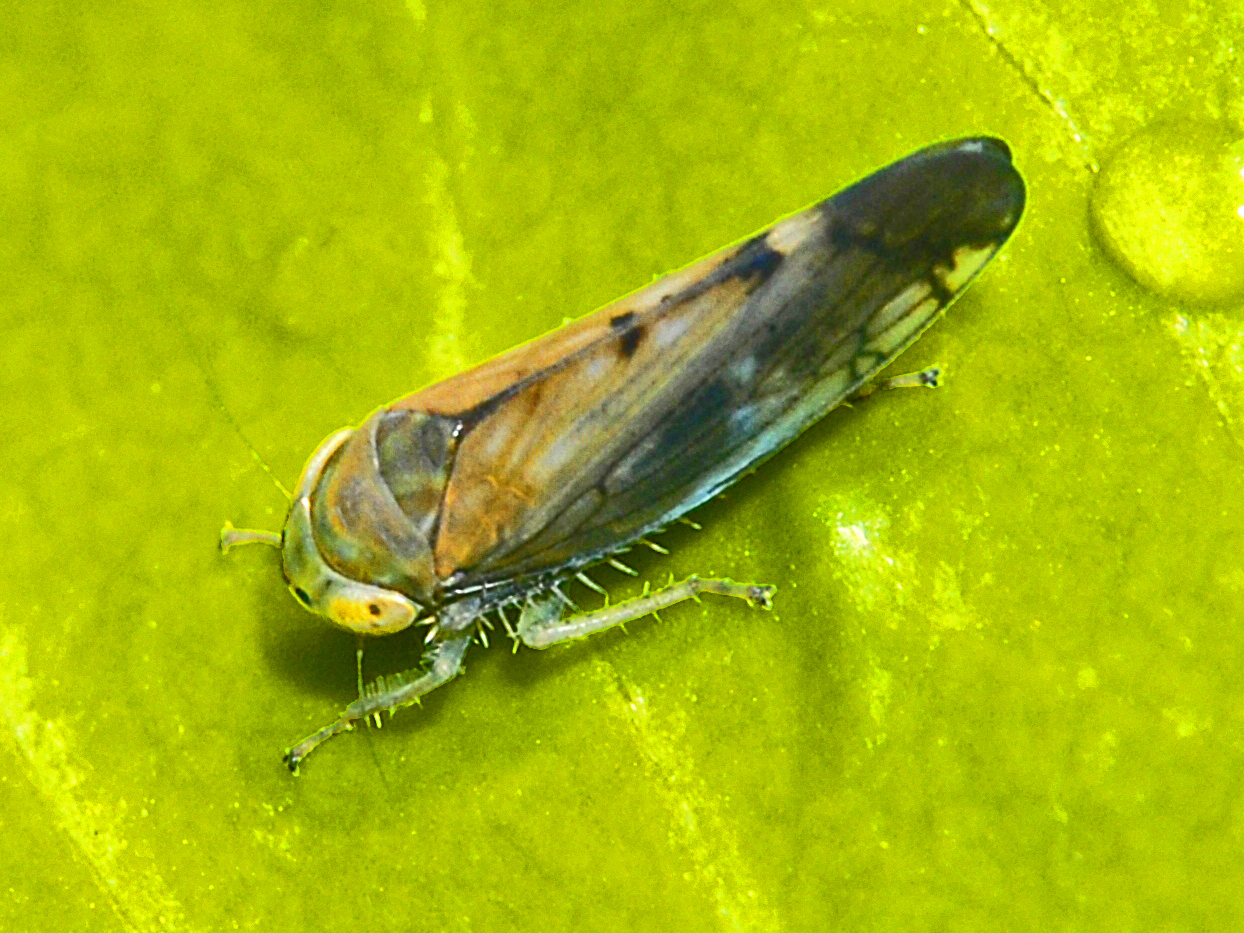
- Anoplotettix fuscovenosus

Scientific classification
- Domain: Eukaryota
- Kingdom: Animalia
- Phylum: Arthropoda
- Class: Insecta
- Order: Hemiptera
- Suborder: Auchenorrhyncha
- Family: Cicadellidae
- Subfamily: Deltocephalinae
- Tribe: Scaphoideini
- Genus: Anoplotettix; Ribaut, 1942

= Anoplotettix =

Genus of true bugs

Anoplotettix is a genus of leafhoppers belonging to the family Cicadellidae subfamily Deltocephalinae.

== Species ==
- Anoplotettix androsinus
- Anoplotettix beieri
- Anoplotettix bitaeniatus
- Anoplotettix cruciatus
- Anoplotettix danutae
- Anoplotettix eckerleini
- Anoplotettix emeljanovi
- Anoplotettix etnensis
- Anoplotettix eubeaticus
- Anoplotettix fastuosus
- Anoplotettix fuscovenosus
- Anoplotettix golestanicus
- Anoplotettix graecus
- Anoplotettix guilanicus
- Anoplotettix horvathi
- Anoplotettix hyrcanus
- Anoplotettix ibericus
- Anoplotettix kalkandeleni
- Anoplotettix kofleri
- Anoplotettix kurdicus
- Anoplotettix lodosianus
- Anoplotettix loewii
- Anoplotettix magnificus
- Anoplotettix malickyi
- Anoplotettix novaki
- Anoplotettix putoni
- Anoplotettix remanei
- Anoplotettix rodosicus
- Anoplotettix sahtyiancii
- Anoplotettix samosinus
