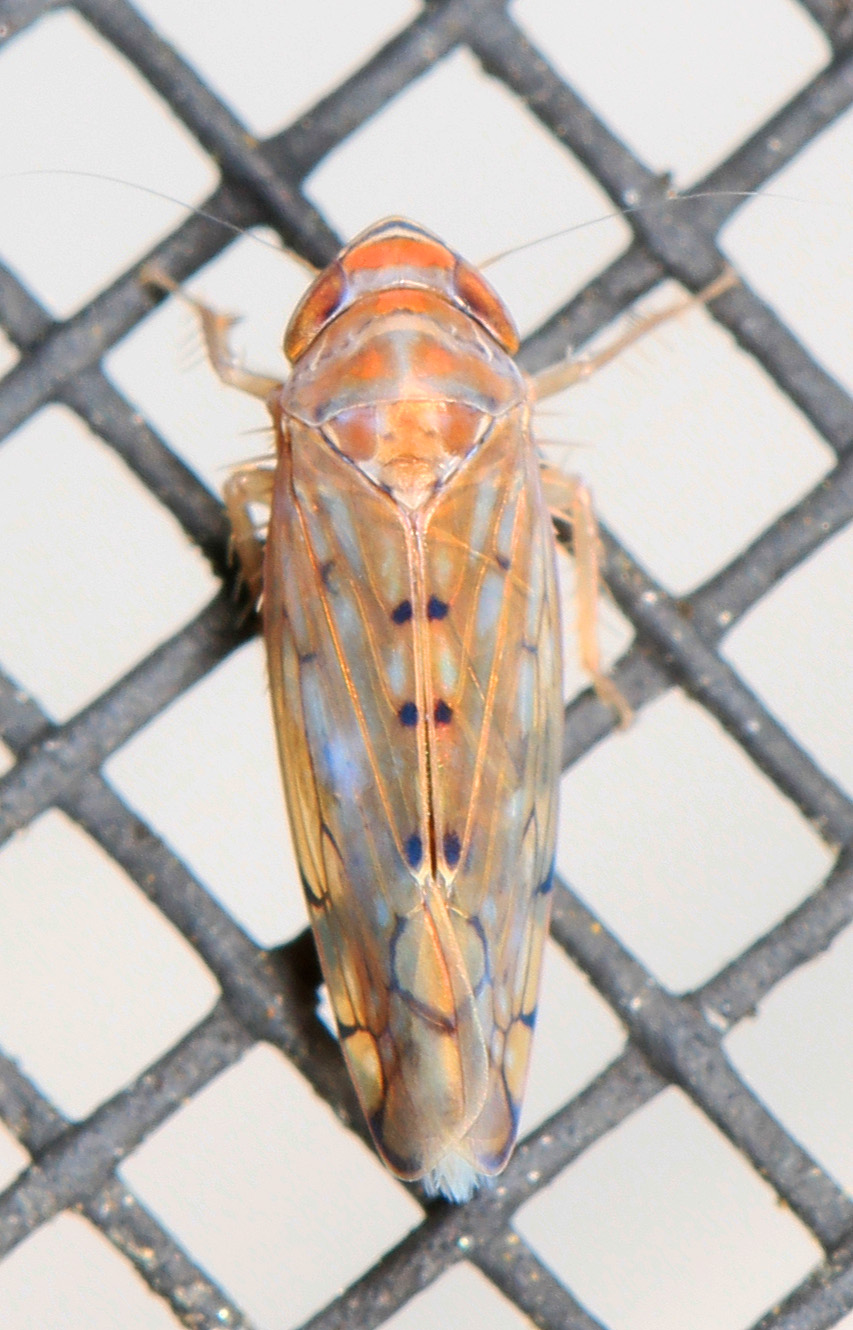

Scientific classification
- Domain: Eukaryota
- Kingdom: Animalia
- Phylum: Arthropoda
- Class: Insecta
- Order: Hemiptera
- Suborder: Auchenorrhyncha
- Family: Cicadellidae
- Genus: Osbornellus
- Species: O. limosus

Binomial name
- Osbornellus limosus DeLong, 1941

= Osbornellus limosus =

Species of true bug

Osbornellus limosus is a species of leafhopper in the family Cicadellidae.
