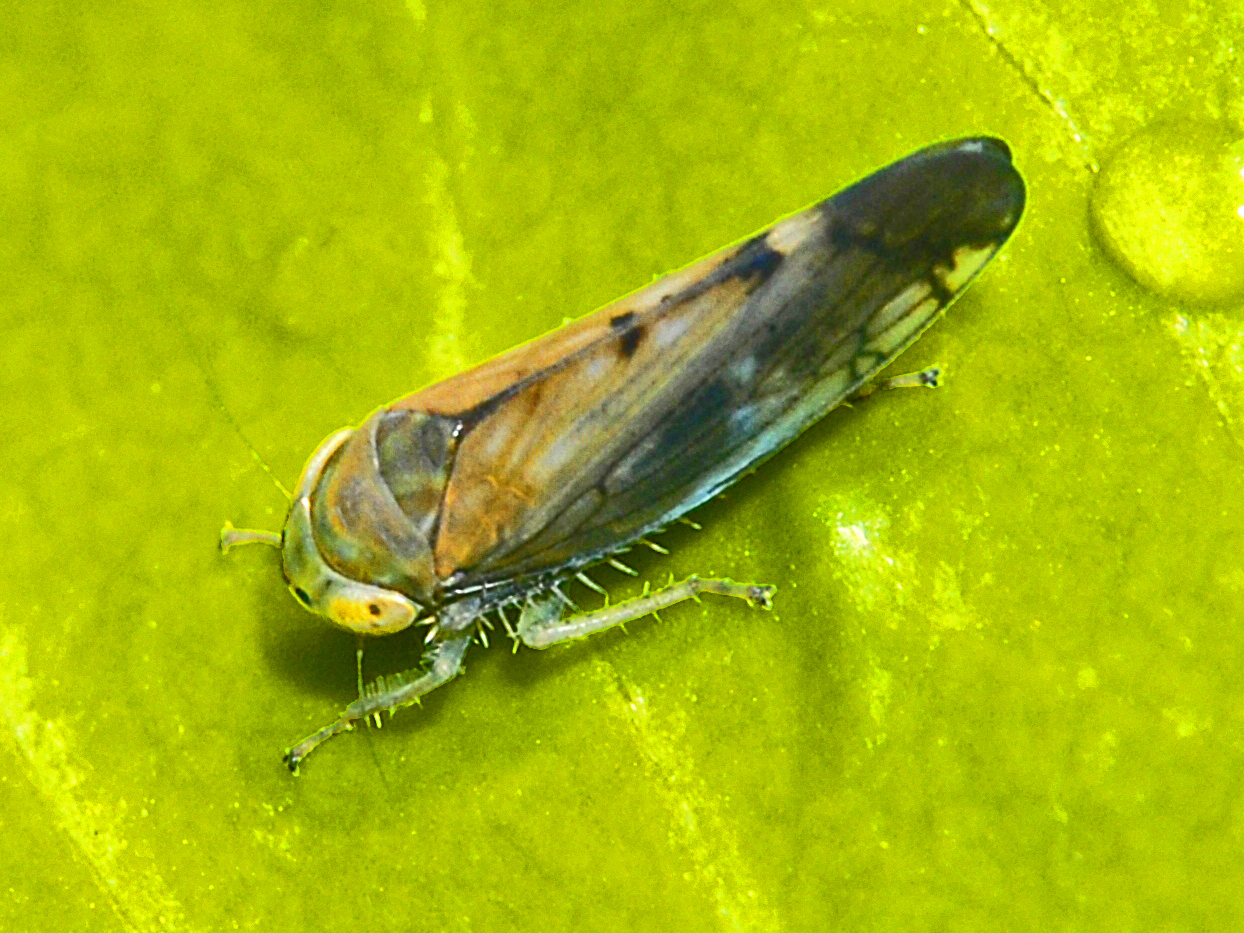
- Anoplotettix fuscovenosus, dorsal view

Scientific classification
- Domain: Eukaryota
- Kingdom: Animalia
- Phylum: Arthropoda
- Class: Insecta
- Order: Hemiptera
- Suborder: Auchenorrhyncha
- Family: Cicadellidae
- Genus: Anoplotettix
- Species: A. fuscovenosus

Binomial name
- Anoplotettix fuscovenosus (Ferrari, 1882)

= Anoplotettix fuscovenosus =

Species of true bug

Anoplotettix fuscovenosus is a species of leafhoppers belonging to the family Cicadellidae subfamily Deltocephalinae. A subspecies is Anoplotettix fuscovenosus bipuncta.

== Description ==
Anoplotettix fuscovenosus can reach a length of about 5.5–6.5 millimetres (0.22–0.26 in). Basic color is brownish or yellowish, with characteristic black spots on the front head near the compound eyes and a dark venation of the wings (hence the Latin name fuscovenosus of the species).

These insects are polyphagous, larvae and nymphs live on various wild herbaceous plants, while adults live on bushy plants and on broadleaf trees. Adults mainly feed on fruits, especially grapevine (Vitis vinifera). These plant suckers show one generation per year. They overwinter in the egg stage.

== Distribution ==
This species is present in most of Europe and in North Africa.
