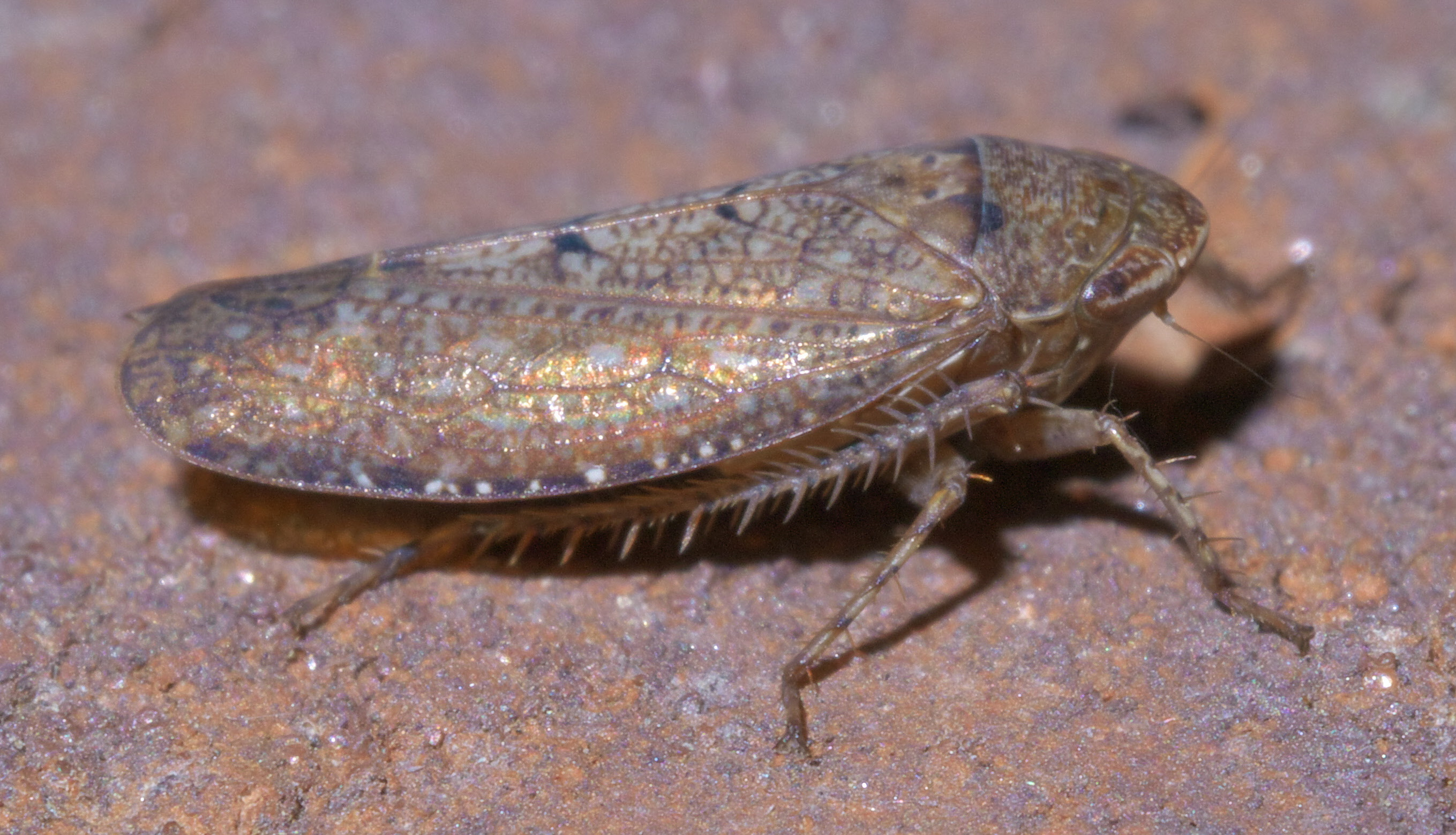

Scientific classification
- Domain: Eukaryota
- Kingdom: Animalia
- Phylum: Arthropoda
- Class: Insecta
- Order: Hemiptera
- Suborder: Auchenorrhyncha
- Family: Cicadellidae
- Tribe: Phlepsiini
- Genus: Texananus; Ball, 1918

= Texananus =

Genus of leafhoppers

Texananus is a genus of leafhoppers in the family Cicadellidae. There are at least 50 described species in Texananus.

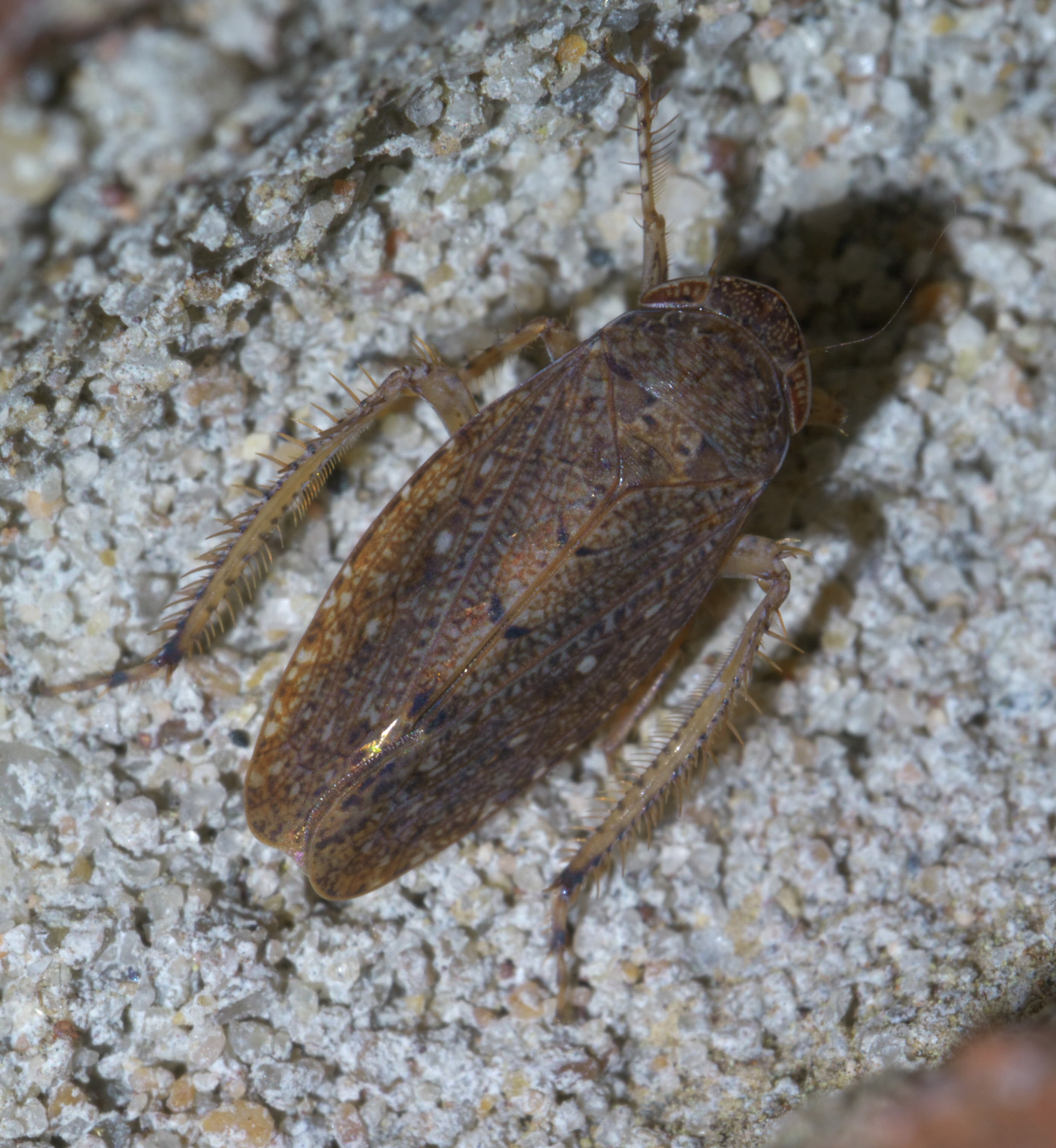

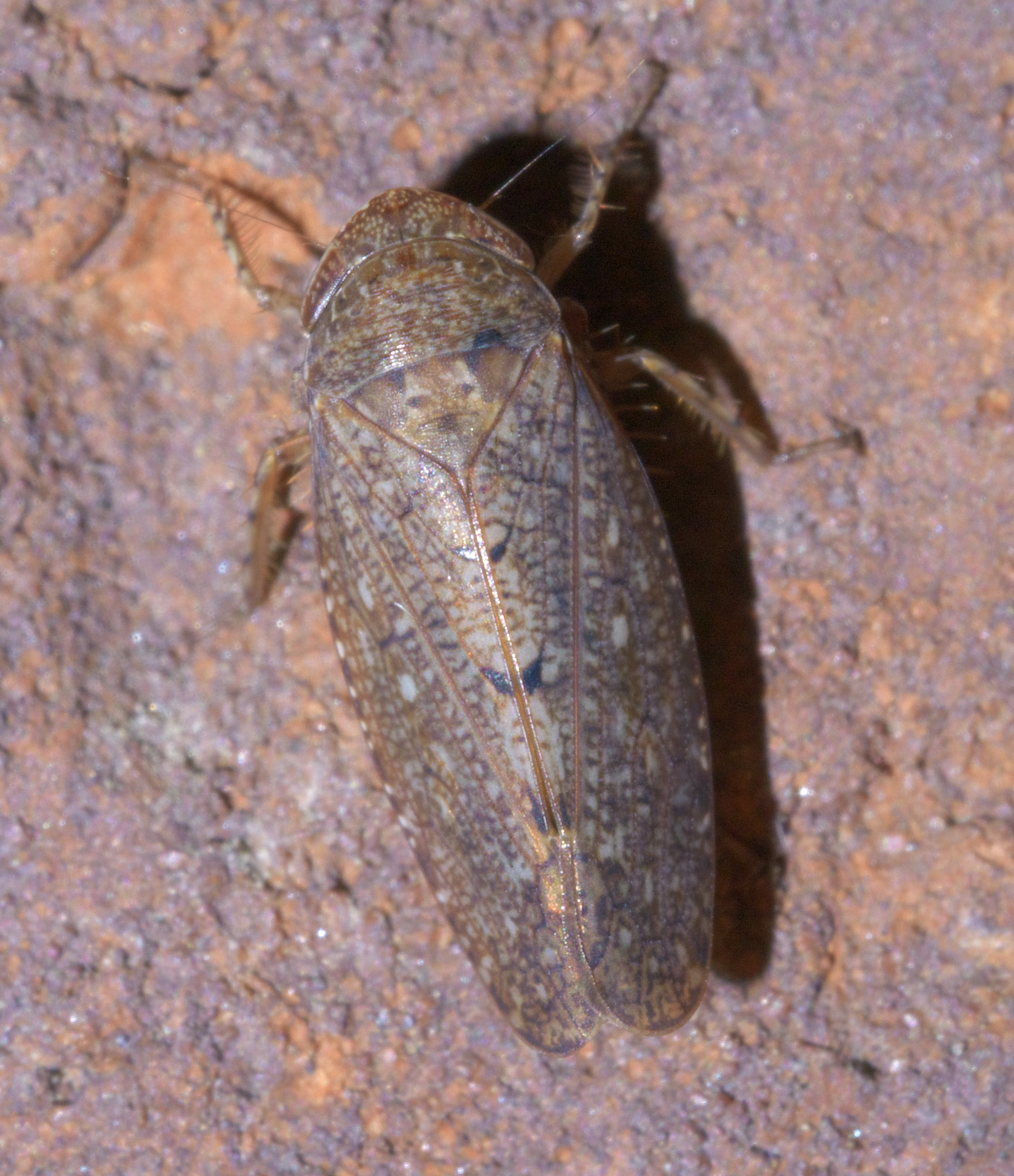

== Species ==
These 57 species belong to the genus Texananus:

- Texananus angus DeLong 1938^{c g}
- Texananus apicalis DeLong & Hershberger 1948^{c g}
- Texananus arctostaphylae Ball 1900^{c g}
- Texananus areolatus Baker, 1898^{c g b} (spotted Texan leafhopper)
- Texananus barbus DeLong 1944^{c g}
- Texananus biacus DeLong 1939^{c g}
- Texananus bialtus DeLong 1938^{c g}
- Texananus bilicium DeLong 1944^{c g}
- Texananus bullatus DeLong 1939^{c g}
- Texananus caducus DeLong, 1939^{c g b}
- Texananus cajaensis Linnavuori 1959^{c g}
- Texananus constrictus Crowder 1952^{c g}
- Texananus contaminatus Linnavuori 1959^{c g}
- Texananus cumulatus Ball 1900^{c g}
- Texananus curtus DeLong 1939^{c g}
- Texananus cuspidatus DeLong 1939^{c g}
- Texananus decorus (Osborn & Ball, 1897)^{c g b}
- Texananus delicatus Osborn & Lathrop 1923^{c g}
- Texananus denticulus Osborn & Lathrop, 1923^{c g b}
- Texananus deversus DeLong & Hershberger 1949^{c g}
- Texananus dicentrus DeLong 1939^{c g}
- Texananus distinctus Lathrop 1917^{c g}
- Texananus dolus DeLong 1938^{c g}
- Texananus elongatus Ball 1918^{c g}
- Texananus excultus^{b}
- Texananus extensus Crowder 1952^{c g}
- Texananus extremus Ball 1901^{c g}
- Texananus fumosus Crowder 1952^{c g}
- Texananus gladius DeLong 1938^{c g}
- Texananus graphicus Ball 1900^{c g}
- Texananus handlirschi Ball 1918^{c g}
- Texananus hosanus Ball 1918^{c g}
- Texananus lathropi Baker 1925^{c g}
- Texananus latipex DeLong, 1938^{c g b}
- Texananus longipennis Crowder, 1952^{c g b}
- Texananus lyratus DeLong & Hershberger 1948^{c g}
- Texananus majestus (Osborn & Ball, 1897)^{c g b}
- Texananus marmor Sanders & DeLong 1923^{c g}
- Texananus mexicanus Ball 1918^{c g}
- Texananus monticolus DeLong 1943^{c g}
- Texananus oregonus Ball, 1931^{c g b}
- Texananus ovatus Van Duzee, 1892^{c g b}
- Texananus pergradus DeLong 1938^{c g}
- Texananus personatus Baker 1898^{c g}
- Texananus proximus Crowder 1952^{c g}
- Texananus rufusculus Osborn & Lathrop 1923^{c g}
- Texananus sabinus Sanders & DeLong 1920^{c g}
- Texananus serrellus DeLong 1944^{c g}
- Texananus sextus Crowder 1952^{c g}
- Texananus sonorus Ball 1936^{c g}
- Texananus spatulatus Van Duzee 1892^{c g}
- Texananus superbus Van Duzee 1892^{c g}
- Texananus ultratus DeLong 1943^{c g}
- Texananus uncinatus DeLong 1944^{c g}
- Texananus uncus DeLong 1944^{c g}
- Texananus validus Crowder 1952^{c g}
- Texananus vermiculatus DeLong 1938^{c g}

Data sources: i = ITIS, c = Catalogue of Life, g = GBIF, b = Bugguide.net
