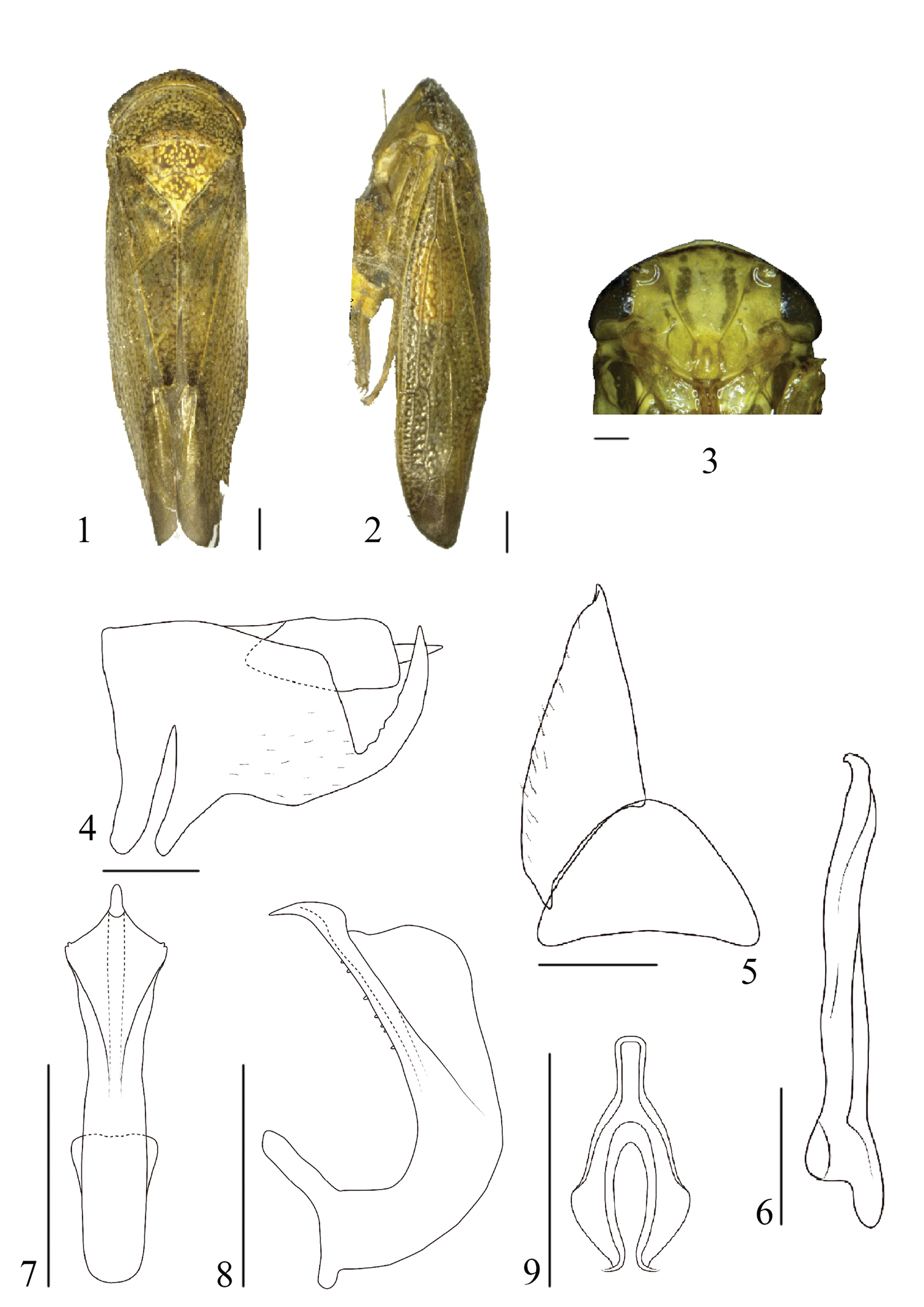
- Drabescus bilaminatus

Scientific classification
- Kingdom: Animalia
- Phylum: Arthropoda
- Clade: Pancrustacea
- Class: Insecta
- Order: Hemiptera
- Suborder: Auchenorrhyncha
- Family: Cicadellidae
- Subfamily: Deltocephalinae
- Tribe: Scaphoideini
- Subtribe: Drabescina
- Genus: Drabescus; Stål, 1870

Synonyms
- Dabrescus Signoret, 1880; Drabescens and other orthographic variants Stål, 1870; Leucostigmidium Anufriev & Emelyanov, 1988; Ochrescus Anufriev & Emelyanov, 1988; Paradrabescus Kuoh, 1985; Tylissus Stål, 1870

= Drabescus (leafhopper) =

Genus of true bugs

Drabescus is the type genus of Asian planthoppers in the subtribe Drabescina (subfamily Deltocephalinae); it was erected by Carl Stål in 1870. Species have been recorded from Africa, (especially eastern) Asia to Australia.

== Species ==
The Global Biodiversity Information Facility lists:

1. Drabescus albofasciatus Cai & He, 1998
2. Drabescus albosignus Li & Wang, 2005
3. Drabescus albostriatus Yang, 1995
4. Drabescus angulatus Signoret, 1880
5. Drabescus atratus Kato, 1933
6. Drabescus austroindicus Viraktamath, Webb & Yeshwanth, 2022
7. Drabescus bicornis Shang, Zhang & Shen, 2009
8. Drabescus bifurcatus Shang, Zhang & Shen, 2009
9. Drabescus bilaminatus Yu, Webb, Dai & Yang, 2019
10. Drabescus breviolus Matsumura, 1912
11. Drabescus brevispinus Shang, Zhang & Shen, 2009
12. Drabescus brunneus Evans, 1972
13. Drabescus convolutus Wang, Qu, Xing & Dai, 2016
14. Drabescus cuspidatus Wang, Qu, Xing & Dai, 2016
15. Drabescus evansi Zhang & Webb, 1996
16. Drabescus extensus Kuoh, 1985
17. Drabescus feraminensis Evans, 1972
18. Drabescus flavicollis Linnavuori, 1960
19. Drabescus formosanus Matsumura, 1912
20. Drabescus furcatus Cai & Shen, 2002
21. Drabescus fuscorufous Kuoh, 1985
22. Drabescus gracilis Li & Wang, 2005
23. Drabescus gressitti Evans, 1972
24. Drabescus hainanensis Lu, Webb & Zhang, 2019
25. Drabescus henanensis Zhang, Zhang & Chen, 1997
26. Drabescus ineffectus (Walker, 1858)
27. Drabescus jinxiuensis Zhang & Shang, 2003
28. Drabescus kaindii Evans, 1972
29. Drabescus kempi Singh-Pruthi, 1930
30. Drabescus lamellatus Zhang & Shang, 2003
31. Drabescus lii Zhang & Shang, 2003
32. Drabescus limbaticeps (Stål, 1858)
33. Drabescus longispinus Shang, Zhang & Shen, 2009
34. Drabescus macrocladus Xu & Zhang, 2023
35. Drabescus minipenis Zhang, Zhang & Chen, 1997
36. Drabescus modestus Linnavuori, 1960
37. Drabescus mucronatus Xu & Zhang, 2023
38. Drabescus multidentatus Wang, Qu, Xing & Dai, 2016
39. Drabescus multipunctatus Yu, Webb, Dai & Yang, 2019
40. Drabescus natalensis Distant, 1910
41. Drabescus nervosopunctatus Signoret, 1880
42. Drabescus nigrifemoratus (Matsumura, 1905)
43. Drabescus nigrofacialis (Distant, 1918)
44. Drabescus nitens (Stål, 1870)
45. Drabescus nitobei Matsumura, 1912
46. Drabescus notatus Schumacher, 1915
47. Drabescus ogumae Matsumura, 1912
48. Drabescus pallidus Matsumura, 1912
49. Drabescus pellucidus Cai & Shen, 1999
50. Drabescus piceatus Kuoh, 1985
51. Drabescus piceus (Kuoh, 1985)
52. Drabescus politus (Walker, 1869)
53. Drabescus quadrispinosus Shang, Webb & Zhang, 2014
54. Drabescus remotus (Walker, 1851) - type species
55. Drabescus samoanus Osborn, 1934
56. Drabescus shillongensis Rao, 1989
57. Drabescus sirunkensis Evans, 1972
58. Drabescus stilliformis Xu & Zhang, 2018
59. Drabescus stramineus Distant, 1908
60. Drabescus testaceus (Kuoh, 1985)
61. Drabescus vilbastei Zhang & Webb, 1996
62. Drabescus viraktamathi Xu & Zhang, 2018
63. Drabescus vitreus Schmidt, 1926
64. Drabescus wauensis Shang, Zhang & Shen, 2009
65. Drabescus yoshitakei Kamitani, 1996
66. Drabescus zhangi Zahniser & Dietrich, 2013
