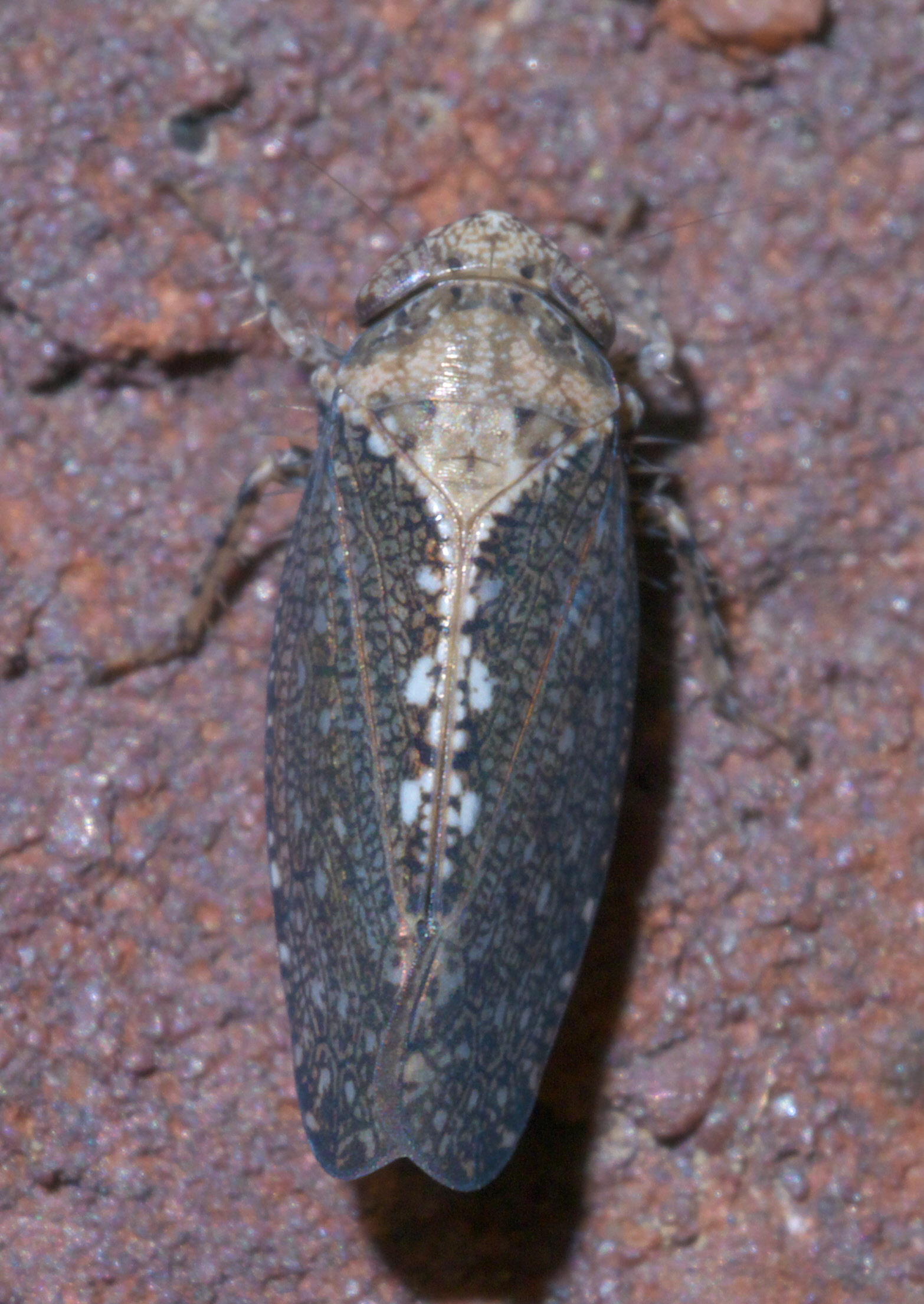

Scientific classification
- Domain: Eukaryota
- Kingdom: Animalia
- Phylum: Arthropoda
- Class: Insecta
- Order: Hemiptera
- Suborder: Auchenorrhyncha
- Family: Cicadellidae
- Genus: Excultanus
- Species: E. excultus

Binomial name
- Excultanus excultus Uhler, 1877

= Excultanus excultus =

Species of true bug

Excultanus excultus is a species of leafhopper in the family Cicadellidae.
