= Paramelia =

Scientific classification
- Domain: Eukaryota
- Kingdom: Animalia
- Phylum: Arthropoda
- Class: Insecta
- Order: Hemiptera
- Suborder: Auchenorrhyncha
- Family: Cicadellidae
- Subfamily: Deltocephalinae
- Genus: Paramelia; Evans, 1954

Genus of true bugs

Paramelia is a genus of leafhoppers belonging to the family Cicadellidae subfamily Deltocephalinae from the Malagasy region.

== Species ==
Some species of this genus are:

- Paramelia colorata (Linnavuori, 1954)
- Paramelia pallida Evans 1954
- Paramelia typica Evans 1954
