= Drabescina =

Scientific classification
- Kingdom: Animalia
- Phylum: Arthropoda
- Class: Insecta
- Order: Hemiptera
- Suborder: Auchenorrhyncha
- Family: Cicadellidae
- Tribe: Scaphoideini
- Subtribe: Drabescina; Ishihara, 1953

Synonyms
- Bhatiini Linnavuori & Al-Ne'amy, 1983; Drabescinae Ishihara, 1953; Paraboloponidae Ishihara, 1953; Paraboloponina Ishihara, 1953; Paraboloponinae Ishihara, 1953; Paraboloponini Ishihara, 1953

Tribe of insects

Drabescina is a subtribe (previously a tribe) of leafhoppers in the subfamily Deltocephalinae.

== Genera ==
The World Auchenorrhyncha Database currently (2025) includes:

1. Abcoronalis Lu & Zhang, 2018
2. Athysanopsis Matsumura, 1905
3. Auranticopona Lu, Dietrich, Webb & Zhang, 2025
4. Bhatia (leafhopper) Distant, 1908
5. Bhatiahamus Lu & Zhang, 2014
6. Canopyana Viraktamath & Srinivasa, 2006
7. Carvaka Distant, 1918
8. Chandrapona Lu, Dietrich, Webb & Zhang, 2019
9. Chandrashekara Dmitriev, 2020
10. Divus (leafhopper) Distant, 1908
11. Drabescoides Kwon & Lee, 1979
12. Drabescus Stål, 1870
13. Dryadomorpha Kirkaldy, 1906
14. Eminea Seven, 1997
15. Favintiga Webb, 1981
16. Fistulatus Zhang, Zhang & Chen, 1997
17. Forficus Qu, 2015
18. Guineapona Lu & Zhang, 2023
19. Halimunella Kamitani, 2012
20. Hybrasil (leafhopper) Kirkaldy, 1907
21. Indokutara Viraktamath, 1998
22. Isaca Walker, 1857
23. Jamitettix Matsumura, 1940
24. Karoseefa Webb, 1981
25. Kotabala Viraktamath, 1998
26. Kutara Distant, 1908
27. Malaysiapona Lu, Dietrich, Webb & Zhang, 2019
28. Megabyzus (leafhopper) Distant, 1908
29. Mysolis Kirkaldy, 1904
30. Nakula (leafhopper) Distant, 1918
31. Neokutara Lu, Webb & Zhang, 2023
32. Nirvanguina Zhang & Webb, 1996
33. Oceanopona Linnavuori, 1960
34. Odmiella Linnavuori, 1978
35. Odzalana Linnavuori, 1969
36. Omanella Merino, 1936
37. Papuakutara Lu, Webb & Zhang, 2018
38. Parabolopona Matsumura, 1912
39. Paraphysipona Lu, Dietrich, Webb & Zhang, 2025
40. Parohinka Webb, 1981
41. Philipona Lu, Dietrich, Webb & Zhang, 2025
42. Rengatella Zhang & Webb, 1996
43. Rhutelorbus Webb, 1981
44. Roxasella Merino, 1936
45. Roxasellana Zhang & Zhang, 1998
46. Sabahanus Lu, Dietrich, Webb & Zhang, 2025
47. Sombakidia Zhang & Webb, 1996
48. Stenomiella Evans, 1955
49. Tengatka Zhang & Webb, 1996
50. Tenompoella Zhang & Webb, 1996
51. Waigara Zhang & Webb, 1996
52. Welmaya Zhang & Webb, 1996
