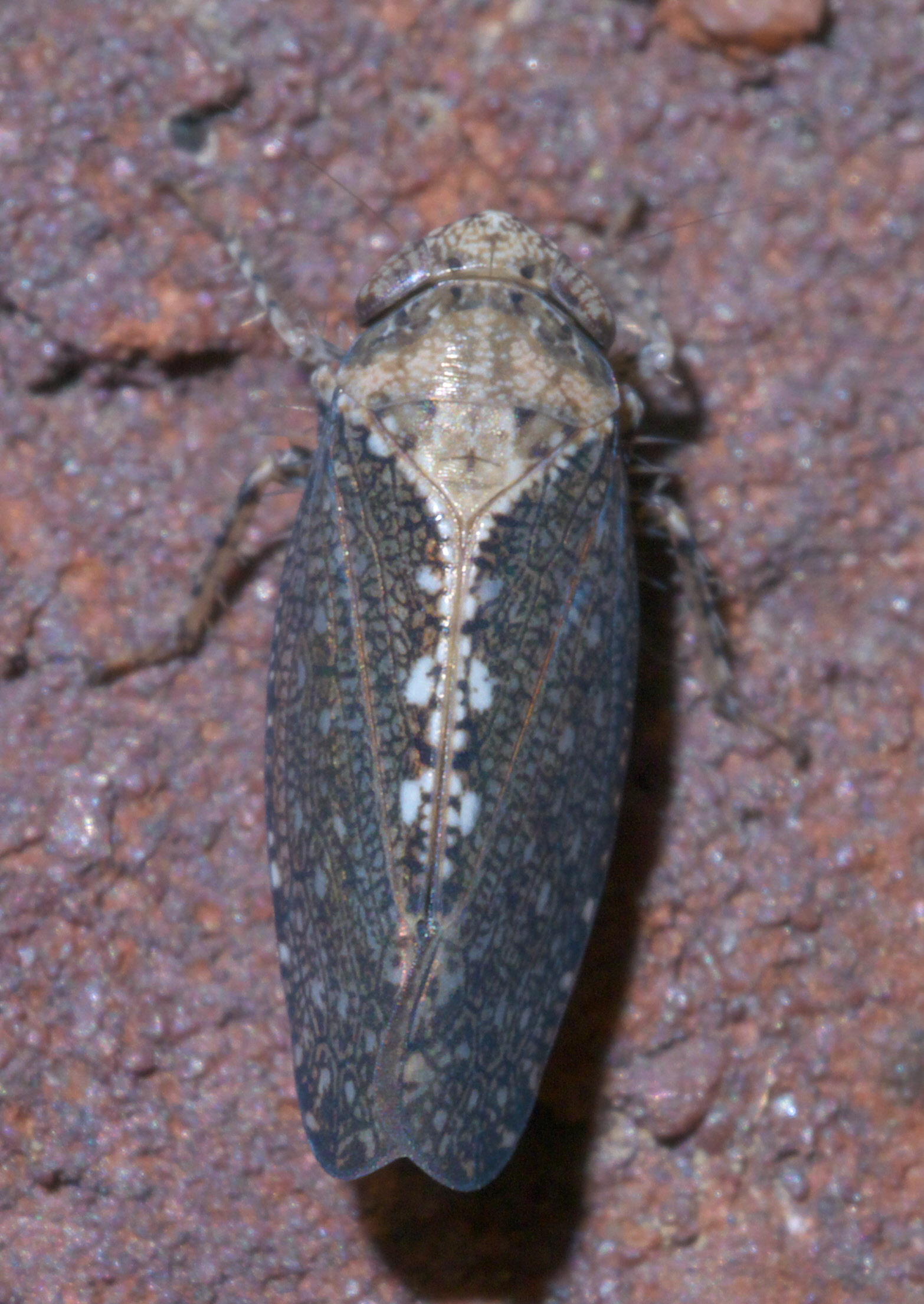
- Excultanus excultus

Scientific classification
- Domain: Eukaryota
- Kingdom: Animalia
- Phylum: Arthropoda
- Class: Insecta
- Order: Hemiptera
- Suborder: Auchenorrhyncha
- Family: Cicadellidae
- Subfamily: Deltocephalinae
- Genus: Excultanus; Oman, 1949

= Excultanus =

Genus of leafhoppers

Excultanus is a genus of leafhoppers in the family Cicadellidae. There are about eight described species in Excultanus.

== Species ==
These eight species belong to the genus Excultanus:

- Excultanus conus DeLong 1939^{c g}
- Excultanus dorothyae DeLong, 1939^{c g b}
- Excultanus excultus Uhler, 1877^{c g b}
- Excultanus hebraeus Ball 1918^{c g}
- Excultanus horridus DeLong 1944^{c g}
- Excultanus paraconus McKamey 2003^{c g}
- Excultanus parrai DeLong 1939^{c g}
- Excultanus plummeri DeLong 1939^{c g}

Data sources: i = ITIS, c = Catalogue of Life, g = GBIF, b = Bugguide.net
