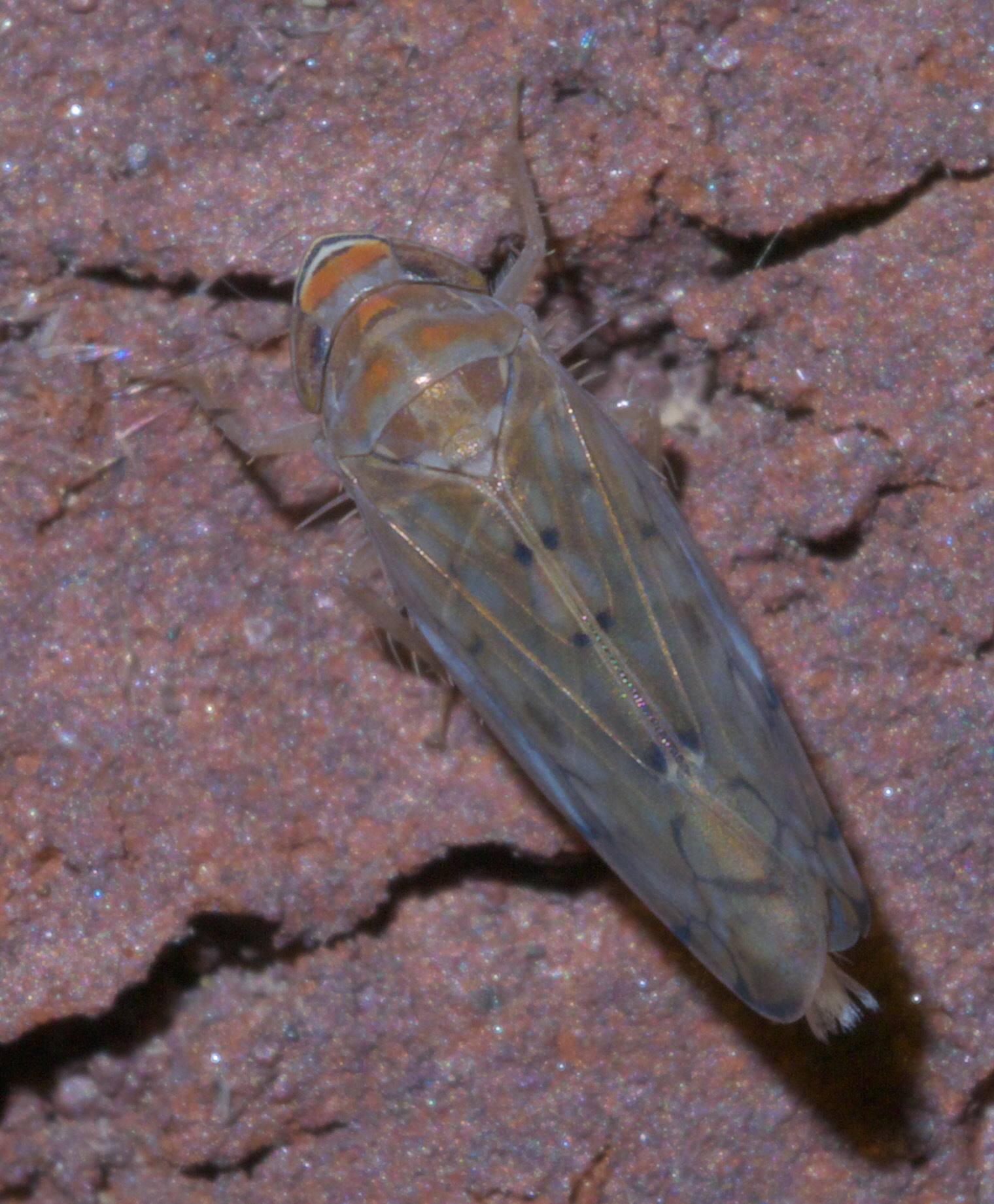

Scientific classification
- Domain: Eukaryota
- Kingdom: Animalia
- Phylum: Arthropoda
- Class: Insecta
- Order: Hemiptera
- Suborder: Auchenorrhyncha
- Family: Cicadellidae
- Subfamily: Deltocephalinae
- Tribe: Scaphoideini
- Genus: Osbornellus; Ball, 1932

= Osbornellus =

Genus of leafhoppers

Osbornellus is a genus of leafhoppers (family Cicadellidae). There are at least 100 described species in Osbornellus.

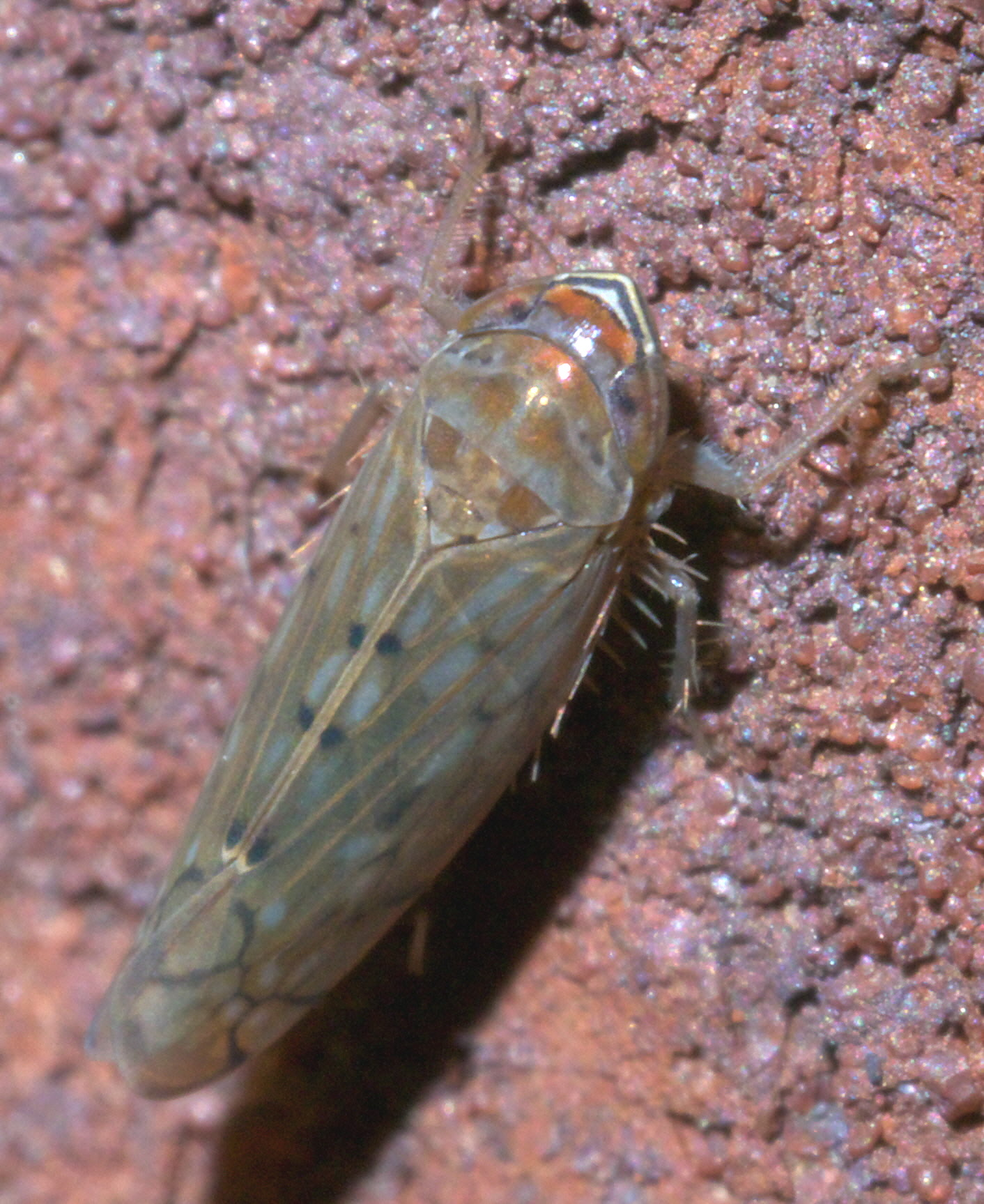

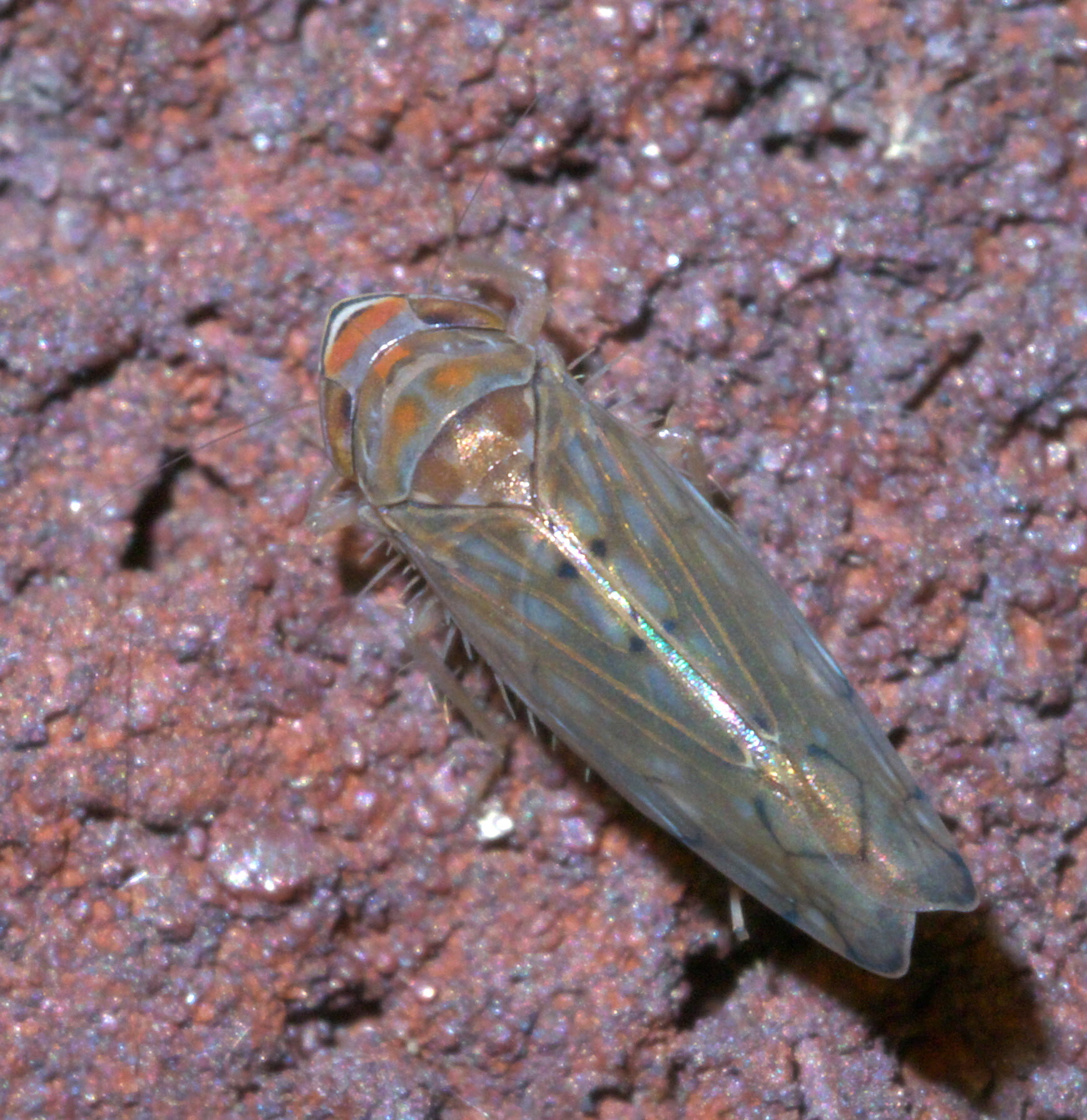

== See also ==
- List of Osbornellus species
