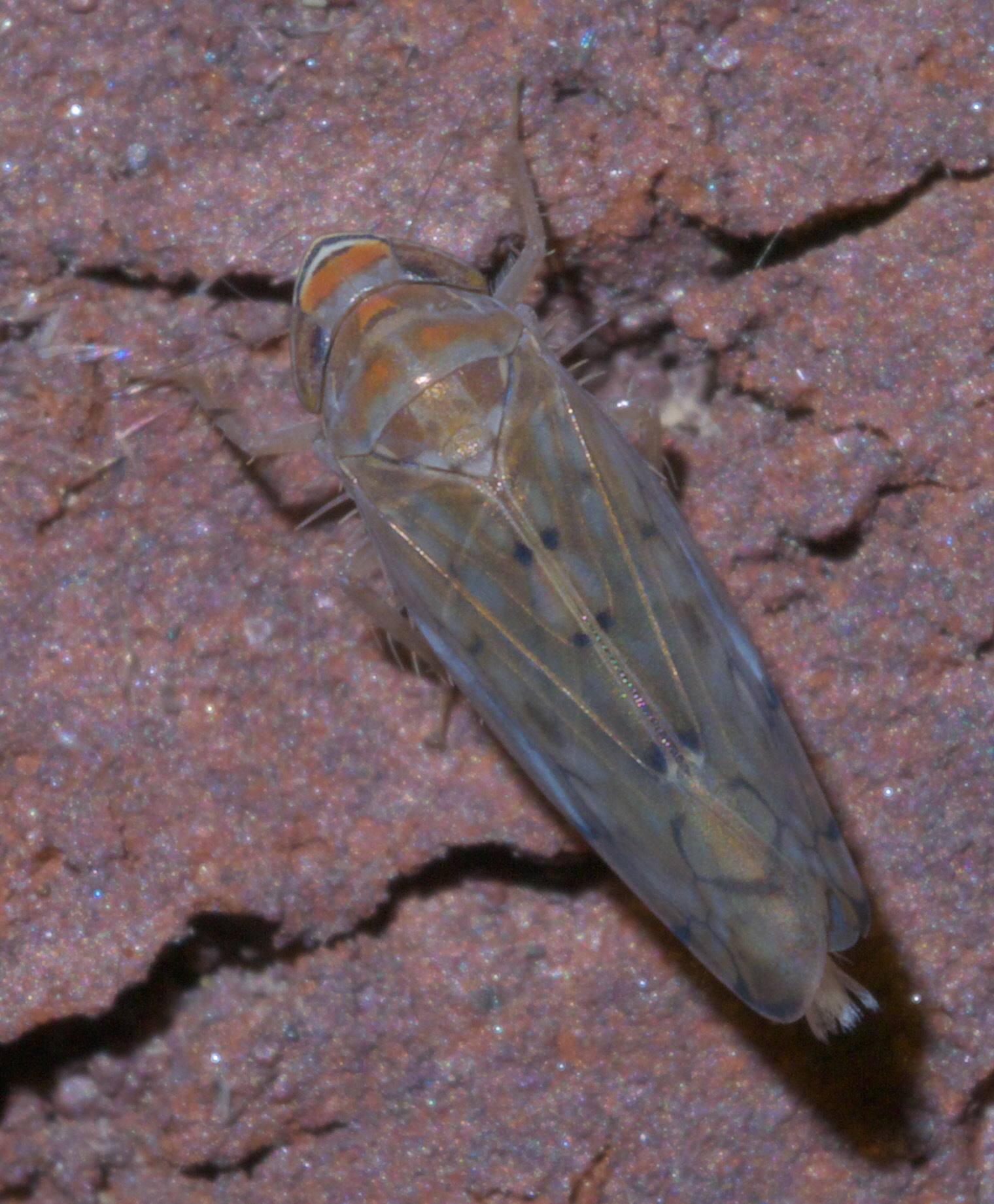
- Osbornellus

Scientific classification
- Kingdom: Animalia
- Phylum: Arthropoda
- Clade: Pancrustacea
- Class: Insecta
- Order: Hemiptera
- Suborder: Auchenorrhyncha
- Family: Cicadellidae
- Subfamily: Deltocephalinae
- Tribe: Scaphoideini; Oman, 1943

Subtribes
- 3: see text.

= Scaphoideini =

Tribe of leafhoppers

Scaphoideini is a tribe of leafhoppers (sufamily Deltocephalinae).

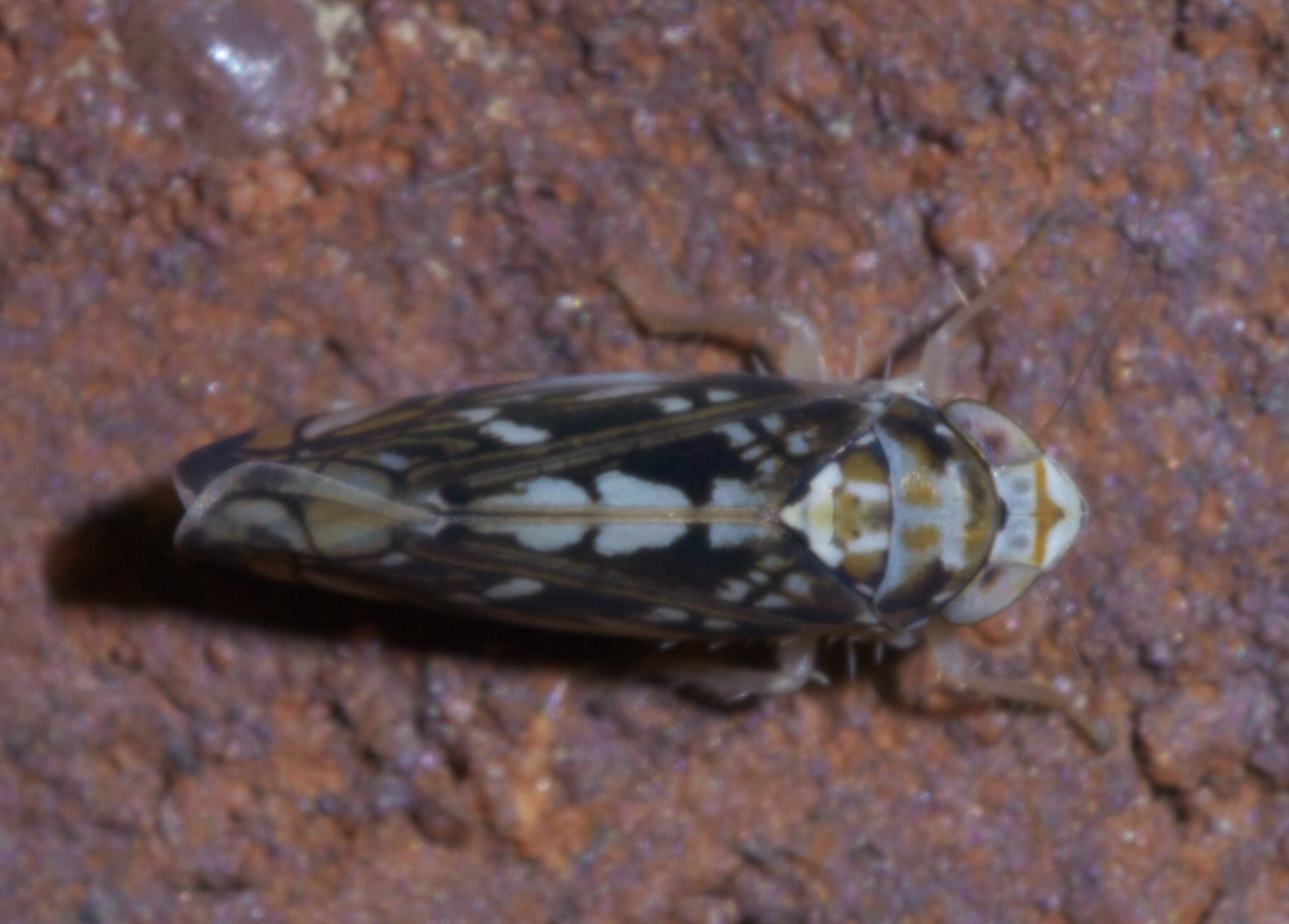
Scaphoideus pullus

== Genera ==
There are currently (2025) three subtribes:

Drabescina Ishihara, 1953
Phlepsiina Zahniser & Dietrich, 2013
Scaphoideina Oman, 1943

- Acastroma Linnavuori, 1969
- Advikus Viraktamath & Yeshwanth, 2020
- Afroideus Linnavuori, 1961
- Alemaia Heller & Linnavuori, 1968
- Amimenus Ishihara, 1953
- Anoplotettix Ribaut, 1942
- Bampurius Dlabola, 1977
- Banus Distant, 1908
- Burakia Kocak, 1981
- Cantura Oman, 1949
- Caphodus Oman, 1938
- Capoideus Theron, 1974
- Changbaninus Fang & Xing, 2019
- Coroticus Distant, 1918
- Dariena Linnavuori & DeLong, 1977
- Delospilopterus Stiller, 2001
- Euscelidella Evans, 1954
- Ferganotettix Dubovsky, 1966
- Grammacephalus Haupt, 1929
- Gunghuyana Distant, 1910
- Loipothea Linnavuori, 1969
- Longicornis Li & Song, 2008
- Madagella Evans, 1954
- Melanetettix Knight & Fletcher, 2007
- Mesotettix Matsumura, 1914
- Mimotettix Matsumura, 1914
- Mirzayansus Dlabola, 1979
- Monobazus Distant, 1908
- Moorada Ghauri, 1975
- Nataretus Theron, 1980
- Neolimnus Linnavuori, 1953
- Neophlepsius Linnavuori, 1955
- Omanana DeLong, 1942
- Osbornellus Ball, 1932
- Pachodus Linnavuori, 1961
- Parallygus Melichar, 1903
- Paramelia Evans, 1954
- Parascaphoidella Wei, Fang & Xing, 2020
- Penthigrampta Dietrich & Rakitov, 2002
- Perugrampta Kramer, 1965
- Perugramptella Dietrich & Rakitov, 2002
- Phlogotettix Ribaut, 1942
- Phlogothamnus Ishihara, 1961
- Platyretus Melichar, 1903
- Premanus DeLong, 1944
- Prescottia Ball, 1932
- Scaphodhara Viraktamath & Mohan, 1994
- Scaphoidella Vilbaste, 1968
- Scaphoideus Uhler, 1889
- Scaphoidophyes Kirkaldy, 1906
- Scaphoidula Osborn, 1923
- Scaphomonus Viraktamath, 2009
- Sikhamani Viraktamath & Webb, 2006
- Soleatus DeLong, 1971
- Spathanus DeLong, 1945
- Stenogrampta Dietrich & Rakitov, 2002
- Sudhamruta Viraktamath & Anantha Murthy, 1999
- Tbilisica Dlabola, 1958
- Thamnophryne Kirkaldy, 1907
- Thryaksha Viraktamath & Anantha Murthy, 1999
- Tongdotettix Kwon, 1980
- Tuakamara Webb, 1980
- Univagris Viraktamath & Anantha Murthy, 1999
- Wanritettix Vilbaste, 1969
