= Maiestas lineata =

Scientific classification
- Kingdom: Animalia
- Phylum: Arthropoda
- Class: Insecta
- Order: Hemiptera
- Suborder: Auchenorrhyncha
- Family: Cicadellidae
- Genus: Maiestas
- Species: M. lineata

Binomial name
- Maiestas lineata Dmitriev, 2020

Synonyms
- Deltocephalus bilineatus Dash & Viraktamath, 1998 (preocc.)

Species of true bug

Maiestas lineata is a species of bug from the Cicadellidae family that is endemic to India. It was formerly placed within Recilia, but a 2009 revision moved it to Maiestas.
