= Maiestas latifrons =

Scientific classification
- Domain: Eukaryota
- Kingdom: Animalia
- Phylum: Arthropoda
- Class: Insecta
- Order: Hemiptera
- Suborder: Auchenorrhyncha
- Family: Cicadellidae
- Genus: Maiestas
- Species: M. latifrons

Binomial name
- Maiestas latifrons (Matsumura, 1902)

Species of true bug

Maiestas latifrons, the rice broad-headed leafhopper, formerly Recilia latifrons, is a species of bug from the Cicadellidae family that can be found in China, Japan, Korea, and the Russian maritime. It can be found on and feeds on rice plants. It was formerly placed within Recilia, but a 2009 revision moved it to Maiestas.
