= Maiestas parapruthii =

Scientific classification
- Domain: Eukaryota
- Kingdom: Animalia
- Phylum: Arthropoda
- Class: Insecta
- Order: Hemiptera
- Suborder: Auchenorrhyncha
- Family: Cicadellidae
- Genus: Maiestas
- Species: M. parapruthii

Binomial name
- Maiestas parapruthii Chalam & Rama Subba Rao, 2005

Species of true bug

Maiestas parapruthii (formerly Recilia parapruthii) is a species of bug from the Cicadellidae family that is endemic to India.

The species was moved from Recilia to Maiestas in 2009.
