= Maiestas antea =

Scientific classification
- Domain: Eukaryota
- Kingdom: Animalia
- Phylum: Arthropoda
- Class: Insecta
- Order: Hemiptera
- Suborder: Auchenorrhyncha
- Family: Cicadellidae
- Genus: Maiestas
- Species: M. antea

Binomial name
- Maiestas antea (Linnavuori, 1969)

Species of true bug

Maiestas antea is a species of bug from the Cicadellidae family that is endemic to Congo. It was formerly placed within Recilia, but a 2009 revision moved it to Maiestas.
