= Maiestas trifasciata =

Scientific classification
- Domain: Eukaryota
- Kingdom: Animalia
- Phylum: Arthropoda
- Class: Insecta
- Order: Hemiptera
- Suborder: Auchenorrhyncha
- Family: Cicadellidae
- Genus: Maiestas
- Species: M. trifasciata

Binomial name
- Maiestas trifasciata (Lindberg, 1954)

Species of true bug

Maiestas trifasciata (formerly Recilia trifasciatus) is a species of bug from the Cicadellidae family that can be found on Canary Islands and countries including Iran and Burkina Faso. It was formerly placed within Recilia, but a 2009 revision moved it to Maiestas.
