= Maiestas hastata =

Scientific classification
- Domain: Eukaryota
- Kingdom: Animalia
- Phylum: Arthropoda
- Class: Insecta
- Order: Hemiptera
- Suborder: Auchenorrhyncha
- Family: Cicadellidae
- Genus: Maiestas
- Species: M. hastata

Binomial name
- Maiestas hastata (Dash & Viraktamath, 1998)

Species of true bug

Maiestas hastata (formerly Recilia hastatus) is a species of leafhopper from the Cicadellidae family that is endemic to India. It was formerly placed within Recilia, but a 2009 revision moved it to Maiestas.
