= Maiestas glabra =

Scientific classification
- Domain: Eukaryota
- Kingdom: Animalia
- Phylum: Arthropoda
- Class: Insecta
- Order: Hemiptera
- Suborder: Auchenorrhyncha
- Family: Cicadellidae
- Genus: Maiestas
- Species: M. glabra

Binomial name
- Maiestas glabra (Cai & Britton, 2001)

Synonyms
- Recilia glabra Cai & Britton, 2001

Species of true bug

Maiestas glabra, formerly Recilia glabra, is a species of bugs from the Cicadellidae family that is endemic to Zhejiang province of China. It was formerly placed within Recilia, but a 2009 revision moved it to Maiestas.
