= Recilia elongatoocellata =

Scientific classification
- Kingdom: Animalia
- Phylum: Arthropoda
- Clade: Pancrustacea
- Class: Insecta
- Order: Hemiptera
- Suborder: Auchenorrhyncha
- Family: Cicadellidae
- Subfamily: Deltocephalinae
- Tribe: Deltocephalini
- Genus: Recilia
- Species: R. elongatoocellata

Binomial name
- Recilia elongatoocellata (de Motschulsky, 1859)

Synonyms
- Maiestas elangatoocellatus (de Motschulsky, 1859); Deltocephalus elongatoocellatus de Motschulsky, 1859

Species of true bug

Recilia elongatoocellata is a species of leafhopper in the family Cicadellidae. It is endemic to Sri Lanka.

In 2009, the genus Recilia was revised to include only the two species coronifer and raoi, moving the other species to the genus Maiestas. There are currently four species in Recilia, including Recilia elongatoocellata, with more than 100 species in Maiestas.

== Subspecies ==
These two subspecies belong to the species Recilia elongatoocellata:

- Recilia elongatoocellata elongatoocellata (Motschulsky, 1859)
- Recilia elongatoocellata jenjouristi Zakhvatkin, 1935
