= Maiestas heuksandoensis =

Scientific classification
- Domain: Eukaryota
- Kingdom: Animalia
- Phylum: Arthropoda
- Class: Insecta
- Order: Hemiptera
- Suborder: Auchenorrhyncha
- Family: Cicadellidae
- Genus: Maiestas
- Species: M. heuksandoensis

Binomial name
- Maiestas heuksandoensis Kwon & Lee, 1979

Species of true bug

Maiestas heuksandoensis is a species of bugs from Cicadellidae family that is endemic to Korea. It was formerly placed within Recilia, but a 2009 revision moved it to Maiestas.
