= Maiestas rugulans =

Scientific classification
- Domain: Eukaryota
- Kingdom: Animalia
- Phylum: Arthropoda
- Class: Insecta
- Order: Hemiptera
- Suborder: Auchenorrhyncha
- Family: Cicadellidae
- Genus: Maiestas
- Species: M. rugulans

Binomial name
- Maiestas rugulans (Naudé, 1926)

Species of true bug

Maiestas rugulans (formerly Recilia rugulans) is a species of bug from Cicadellidae family that can be found in South Africa and Eswatini. It was formerly placed within Recilia, but a 2009 revision moved it to Maiestas.
