= Maiestas angustisecta =

Scientific classification
- Domain: Eukaryota
- Kingdom: Animalia
- Phylum: Arthropoda
- Class: Insecta
- Order: Hemiptera
- Suborder: Auchenorrhyncha
- Family: Cicadellidae
- Genus: Maiestas
- Species: M. angustisecta

Binomial name
- Maiestas angustisecta (Linnavuori, 1962)

Synonyms
- Recilia dolabra Kramer, 1962; Recilia jordanica Dlabola, 1965

Species of true bug

Maiestas angustisecta is a species of bug from the Cicadellidae family that can be found in Liberia and Congo. Two species from genus Recilia, R. dolabra and R. jordanica were found to be junior synonyms of M. angustisecta in a 2009 revision of Recilia.
