= Maiestas oryzae =

Scientific classification
- Kingdom: Animalia
- Phylum: Arthropoda
- Clade: Pancrustacea
- Class: Insecta
- Order: Hemiptera
- Suborder: Auchenorrhyncha
- Family: Cicadellidae
- Genus: Maiestas
- Species: M. oryzae

Binomial name
- Maiestas oryzae (Matsumura, 1902)

Species of true bug

Maiestas oryzae (formerly Recilia oryzae) is a species of plant-sucking bug from the Cicadellidae family that can be found in Japan, Korea, Taiwan, Henan, province of China. and the far-eastern Russian maritime. Maiestas oryzae feeds on the leaves of plants, including rice plants.

It was formerly placed within Recilia, but a 2009 revision moved it to Maiestas.
