= Maiestas canga =

Scientific classification
- Domain: Eukaryota
- Kingdom: Animalia
- Phylum: Arthropoda
- Class: Insecta
- Order: Hemiptera
- Suborder: Auchenorrhyncha
- Family: Cicadellidae
- Genus: Maiestas
- Species: M. canga

Binomial name
- Maiestas canga (Kramer, 1962)

Synonyms
- Recilia canga Kramer, 1962

Species of true bug

Maiestas canga is a species of insect from the Cicadellidae family that can be found in Liberia and Congo. Originally placed in Recilia, it was later placed within Maiestas when Recilia was revised down to only contain two species in 2009.
