= Maiestas clavata =

Scientific classification
- Domain: Eukaryota
- Kingdom: Animalia
- Phylum: Arthropoda
- Class: Insecta
- Order: Hemiptera
- Suborder: Auchenorrhyncha
- Family: Cicadellidae
- Genus: Maiestas
- Species: M. clavata

Binomial name
- Maiestas clavata (Kramer, 1962)

Synonyms
- Recilia clavata Kramer, 1962

Species of true bug

Maiestas clavata is a species of bug from the Cicadellidae family that can be found in Liberia and Congo. It was originally placed in Recilia, but was moved to Maiestas in a 2009 revision.
