= Maiestas horvathi =

Scientific classification
- Kingdom: Animalia
- Phylum: Arthropoda
- Class: Insecta
- Order: Hemiptera
- Suborder: Auchenorrhyncha
- Family: Cicadellidae
- Genus: Maiestas
- Species: M. horvathi

Binomial name
- Maiestas horvathi (Then, 1896)

Species of true bug

Maiestas horvathi is a species of bugs from Cicadellidae family that can be found in European countries such as Austria, Bulgaria, Czech Republic, Germany, Hungary, Italy, Romania, Russia, Ukraine, Slovenia, Switzerland, and former Yugoslavia. The species are also native to Turkey. It was formerly placed within Recilia, but a 2009 revision moved it to Maiestas.
