= Recilia indica =

Scientific classification
- Kingdom: Animalia
- Phylum: Arthropoda
- Class: Insecta
- Order: Hemiptera
- Suborder: Auchenorrhyncha
- Family: Cicadellidae
- Subfamily: Deltocephalinae
- Tribe: Deltocephalini
- Genus: Recilia
- Species: R. indica

Binomial name
- Recilia indica Rao, 1989

Synonyms
- Deltocephalus indicus (Rao, 1989); Recilia raoi Dash & Viraktamath, 1998

Species of true bug

Recilia indica (synonym R. raoi) is a species of leafhopper from the family Cicadellidae. It is endemic to India.
