= Maiestas viraktamathi =

Scientific classification
- Domain: Eukaryota
- Kingdom: Animalia
- Phylum: Arthropoda
- Class: Insecta
- Order: Hemiptera
- Suborder: Auchenorrhyncha
- Family: Cicadellidae
- Genus: Maiestas
- Species: M. viraktamathi

Binomial name
- Maiestas viraktamathi Zahniser, McKamey & Dmitriev, 2012

Synonyms
- Deltocephalus acuminatus Dash & Viraktamath, 1998 (preocc.)

Species of true bug

Maiestas viraktamathi (formerly Recilia acuminatus) is a species of leafhopper from Cicadellidae family that is endemic to India. It was originally placed within Recilia, but a 2009 revision moved it to Maiestas.
