= Maiestas porticus =

Scientific classification
- Domain: Eukaryota
- Kingdom: Animalia
- Phylum: Arthropoda
- Class: Insecta
- Order: Hemiptera
- Suborder: Auchenorrhyncha
- Family: Cicadellidae
- Genus: Maiestas
- Species: M. porticus

Binomial name
- Maiestas porticus (Melichar, 1903)

Synonyms
- Deltocephalus intermedius Melichar, 1903; Maiestas intermedius (Melichar, 1903); Paivanana durga Distant, 1918; Cicadula fletcheri Singh Pruthi, 1930

Species of true bug

Maiestas porticus is a species of bugs from the family Cicadellidae. It was formerly placed within Recilia, but a 2009 revision moved it to Maiestas.
