= Maiestas ismenias =

Scientific classification
- Domain: Eukaryota
- Kingdom: Animalia
- Phylum: Arthropoda
- Class: Insecta
- Order: Hemiptera
- Suborder: Auchenorrhyncha
- Family: Cicadellidae
- Genus: Maiestas
- Species: M. ismenias

Binomial name
- Maiestas ismenias Linnavuori, 1969

Species of true bug

Maiestas ismenias is a species of bugs from the Cicadellidae family that is endemic to Congo. It was formerly placed within Recilia, but a 2009 revision moved it to Maiestas.
