= Maiestas spiculata =

Scientific classification
- Domain: Eukaryota
- Kingdom: Animalia
- Phylum: Arthropoda
- Class: Insecta
- Order: Hemiptera
- Suborder: Auchenorrhyncha
- Family: Cicadellidae
- Genus: Maiestas
- Species: M. spiculata

Binomial name
- Maiestas spiculata (Dash & Viraktamath, 1998)

Species of true bug

Maiestas spiculata (formerly Recilia spiculatus) is a species of bug from the Cicadellidae family that is endemic to India. It was formerly placed within Recilia, but a 2009 revision moved it to Maiestas.
