= Maiestas beieri =

Scientific classification
- Domain: Eukaryota
- Kingdom: Animalia
- Phylum: Arthropoda
- Class: Insecta
- Order: Hemiptera
- Suborder: Auchenorrhyncha
- Family: Cicadellidae
- Genus: Maiestas
- Species: M. beieri

Binomial name
- Maiestas beieri (Dlabola, 1964)

Species of true bug

Maiestas beieri is a species of bugs from the Cicadellidae family that can be found in African countries like Ethiopia and Sudan, and Saudi Arabia, in Asia. It was formerly placed within Recilia, but a 2009 revision moved it to Maiestas.
