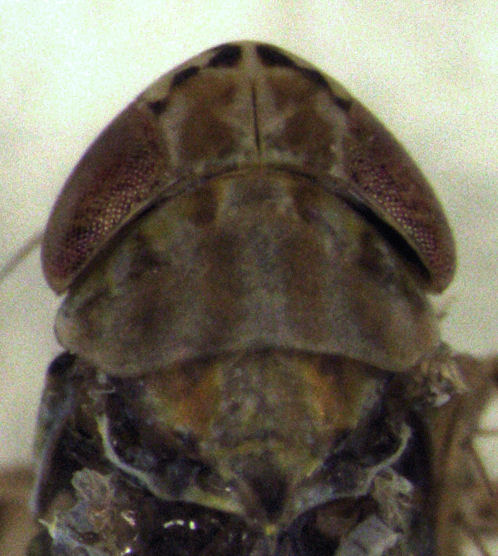
- Head, pronotum, and scutellum

Scientific classification
- Domain: Eukaryota
- Kingdom: Animalia
- Phylum: Arthropoda
- Class: Insecta
- Order: Hemiptera
- Suborder: Auchenorrhyncha
- Family: Cicadellidae
- Genus: Maiestas
- Species: M. vetus

Binomial name
- Maiestas vetus (Knight, 1975)

Synonyms
- Deltocephalus vetus; Recilia vetus Day & Fletcher, 1994

= Maiestas vetus =

Species of true bug

Maiestas vetus is a species of bug from the Cicadellidae family that is indigenous to Australia and New Zealand. It was originally described as Deltocephalus (Recilia) vetus until being revised into Maiestas.

== Description ==
The males of the species are 3.45–3.90 millimetres (0.136–0.154 in) long, with an average of 3.68 millimetres (0.145 in). Their genitalia have a bit longer pygophore. Females are smaller than males, ranging from 3.03–3.88 mm (0.119–0.153 in) with an average of 3.47 mm (0.137 in). Both sexes are elongated, and have near rectangular lobes. Their aedeagus have short shafts, which are cylindrical in shape. They are pale stramineous or ivory-coloured. Their clypeus have a series of transverse bands, which are pale brown in colour. They have two rounded vertices, one of which is located on the top of the apex and has two spots on it. The other is on the anterior margin, closer to the ocellus, which is dark brown in colour. Sometimes they have two longitudinal bands which are pale orange coloured and are located on top of the disc. Their pronotum have three longitudinal bands and are a little bit longer than vertex. They are also the same colour and are located on both sides of midline. Their clypellus is parallel, and has a margin that is adjacent to its gena, which is a bit wider than ocellucular part. The ocelli themselves are separated from the eyes by one diameter. The ventral margin is extended over the gonopore and is narrow.

== Similar species ==
The species is similar to Deltocephalus distinctus, a species that can be found from Sri Lanka to Japan and into Micronesia. The difference between them is that the gonopore is of different size, and is located in the opposite position. It also has much a longer and slender apex, which is located on the aedeagus. The other difference is the complete absence of dark brown spots, which are located on the anterior margin of the vertex. Just like Recilia hospes, the species were found in grass, sedges, shrubs, and on plants in the genus Nothofagus in New Zealand.
