= Maiestas schmidtgeni =

Scientific classification
- Domain: Eukaryota
- Kingdom: Animalia
- Phylum: Arthropoda
- Class: Insecta
- Order: Hemiptera
- Suborder: Auchenorrhyncha
- Family: Cicadellidae
- Genus: Maiestas
- Species: M. schmidtgeni

Binomial name
- Maiestas schmidtgeni (Wagner, 1939 )

Species of true bug

Maiestas schmidtgeni (formerly Recilia schmidtgeni) is a species of bug from the Cicadellidae family that can be found in European countries such as Albania, Austria, Bulgaria, England, France, Germany, Greece, Hungary, Italy (including Sardinia and Sicily), Moldova, Romania, Slovakia, Slovenia, Switzerland, Ukraine, and southern part of Russia. The species can also be found in Israel, Jordan, Saudi Arabia, and Henan province of China.

It was formerly placed within Recilia, but a 2009 revision moved it to Maiestas.
