= Maiestas parajogensis =

Scientific classification
- Domain: Eukaryota
- Kingdom: Animalia
- Phylum: Arthropoda
- Class: Insecta
- Order: Hemiptera
- Suborder: Auchenorrhyncha
- Family: Cicadellidae
- Genus: Maiestas
- Species: M. parajogensis

Binomial name
- Maiestas parajogensis Dmitriev, 2020

Synonyms
- Deltocephalus truncatus Dash & Viraktamath, 1998 (preocc.)

Species of true bug

Maiestas parajogensis (formerly Recilia truncatus) is a species of insect from Cicadellidae family that is endemic to India. It was formerly placed within Recilia, but a 2009 revision moved it to Maiestas.
