= Maiestas obongsanensis =

Scientific classification
- Domain: Eukaryota
- Kingdom: Animalia
- Phylum: Arthropoda
- Class: Insecta
- Order: Hemiptera
- Suborder: Auchenorrhyncha
- Family: Cicadellidae
- Genus: Maiestas
- Species: M. obongsanensis

Binomial name
- Maiestas obongsanensis (Kwon & Lee, 1979)

Synonyms
- Recilia obongsanensis Kwon & Lee, 1979

Species of true bug

Maiestas obongsanensis is a species of bug from the Cicadellidae. It is found on Mount Obongsan, Gangwon-do province of South Korea, and can also be found in Honshu and Tsushima. It was formerly placed within Recilia, but a 2009 revision moved it to Maiestas.

In South Korea it is found in Gyeongsangbuk-do, Gyeongsangnam-do, Gangwon-do, and Jeollabuk-do.
