= Maiestas mica =

Scientific classification
- Kingdom: Animalia
- Phylum: Arthropoda
- Clade: Pancrustacea
- Class: Insecta
- Order: Hemiptera
- Suborder: Auchenorrhyncha
- Family: Cicadellidae
- Genus: Maiestas
- Species: M. mica

Binomial name
- Maiestas mica (Kramer, 1962)

Synonyms
- Recilia mica Kramer, 1962

Species of true bug

Maiestas mica is a species of leafhopper from the Cicadellidae family that can be found in Republic of the Congo, Liberia, and the Ivory Coast. It was formerly placed within Recilia, but a 2009 revision moved it to Maiestas.
