= Maiestas agroecus =

Scientific classification
- Kingdom: Animalia
- Phylum: Arthropoda
- Clade: Pancrustacea
- Class: Insecta
- Order: Hemiptera
- Suborder: Auchenorrhyncha
- Family: Cicadellidae
- Genus: Maiestas
- Species: M. agroecus

Binomial name
- Maiestas agroecus (Dash & Viraktamath, 1998)

Species of true bug

Maiestas agroecus is a species of bug from Cicadellidae family that is endemic to India. It was formerly placed within Recilia, but a 2009 revision moved it to Maiestas.
