= Maiestas maculata =

Scientific classification
- Domain: Eukaryota
- Kingdom: Animalia
- Phylum: Arthropoda
- Class: Insecta
- Order: Hemiptera
- Suborder: Auchenorrhyncha
- Family: Cicadellidae
- Genus: Maiestas
- Species: M. maculata

Binomial name
- Maiestas maculata (Singh-Pruthi, 1930)

Synonyms
- Maiestas prabha (Singh-Pruthi, 1930); Recilia prabha Singh-Pruthi, 1930

Species of true bug

Maiestas maculata is a species of bug from the Cicadellidae family,subfamily Deltocephalinae, and tribe Deltocephalini, that is endemic to India. It was originally placed within Recilia, but a 2009 revision moved it to Maiestas. Subsequently, a 2011 revision found that M. prabha (also formerly placed in Recilia) was a junior synonym of M. maculata.

== Distribution ==
- Native to India (original records from Calcutta and Sikkim).
- Also recently documented in Pakistan, marking its first confirmed presence there

== Specimens and Material Examined ==
Collected in Azad Kashmir, Pakistan (Banjosa), in July 2018 via sweep-net sampling, confirming its broader South Asian range
