= Recilia coronifer =

Scientific classification
- Domain: Eukaryota
- Kingdom: Animalia
- Phylum: Arthropoda
- Class: Insecta
- Order: Hemiptera
- Suborder: Auchenorrhyncha
- Family: Cicadellidae
- Subfamily: Deltocephalinae
- Tribe: Deltocephalini
- Genus: Recilia
- Species: R. coronifer

Binomial name
- Recilia coronifer (Marshall, 1866)

Species of true bug

Recilia coronifer is a species of bug from the Cicadellidae family that can be found in Austria, Belgium, Bulgaria, Czech Republic, France, Germany, Greece, Hungary, Italy, Poland, Romania, Slovenia, Spain, Switzerland, the Netherlands, and Yugoslavia.
