= Maiestas xanthocephalus =

Scientific classification
- Kingdom: Animalia
- Phylum: Arthropoda
- Class: Insecta
- Order: Hemiptera
- Suborder: Auchenorrhyncha
- Family: Cicadellidae
- Genus: Maiestas
- Species: M. xanthocephalus

Binomial name
- Maiestas xanthocephalus (Dash & Viraktamath, 1998)

Species of true bug

Maiestas xanthocephalus (formerly Recilia xanthocephalus) is a species of leafhopper from the Cicadellidae family that is endemic to India. It was formerly placed within Recilia, but a 2009 revision moved it to Maiestas.
