= Maiestas akashiensis =

Scientific classification
- Kingdom: Animalia
- Phylum: Arthropoda
- Clade: Pancrustacea
- Class: Insecta
- Order: Hemiptera
- Suborder: Auchenorrhyncha
- Family: Cicadellidae
- Genus: Maiestas
- Species: M. akashiensis

Binomial name
- Maiestas akashiensis (Matsumura, 1914)

Species of true bug

Maiestas akashiensis is a species of bug from the Cicadellidae family that is endemic to Japan. It was formerly placed within Recilia, but a 2009 revision moved it to Maiestas.
