= Maiestas belonus =

Scientific classification
- Domain: Eukaryota
- Kingdom: Animalia
- Phylum: Arthropoda
- Class: Insecta
- Order: Hemiptera
- Suborder: Auchenorrhyncha
- Family: Cicadellidae
- Genus: Maiestas
- Species: M. belonus

Binomial name
- Maiestas belonus (Dash & Viraktamath, 1998)

Species of bug in the Cicadellidae family endemic to India

Maiestas belonus is a species of bug from the Cicadellidae family that is endemic to India. It was originally placed within Recilia as R. belonus, but a 2009 revision placed it into Maiestas.
