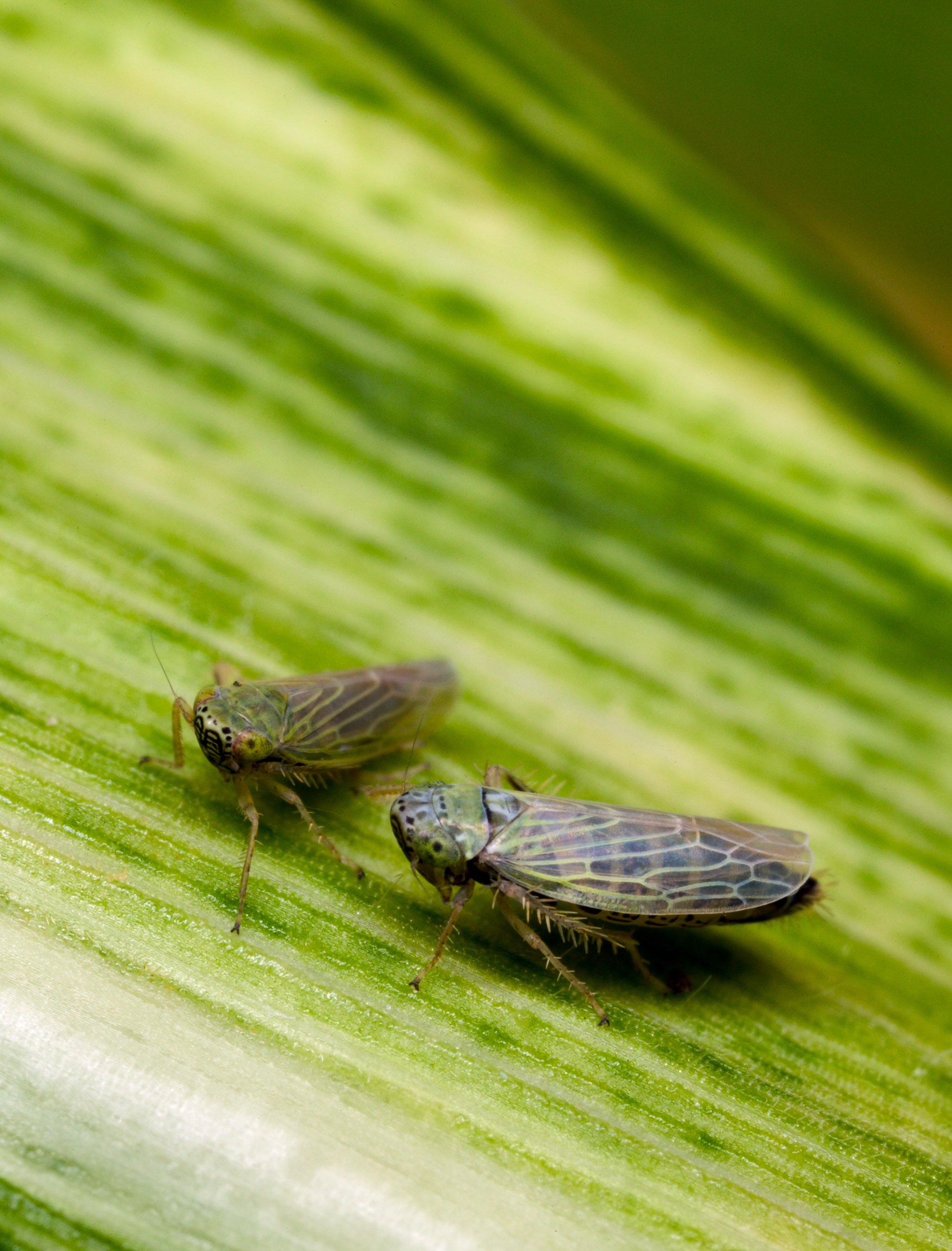

Scientific classification
- Domain: Eukaryota
- Kingdom: Animalia
- Phylum: Arthropoda
- Class: Insecta
- Order: Hemiptera
- Suborder: Auchenorrhyncha
- Family: Cicadellidae
- Genus: Graminella
- Species: G. nigrifrons

Binomial name
- Graminella nigrifrons Forbes, 1885

= Graminella nigrifrons =

Species of true bug

Graminella nigrifrons, the black-faced leafhopper, is a species of leafhopper in the family Cicadellidae.
