= Planicephalus =

Scientific classification
- Kingdom: Animalia
- Phylum: Arthropoda
- Clade: Pancrustacea
- Class: Insecta
- Order: Hemiptera
- Suborder: Auchenorrhyncha
- Family: Cicadellidae
- Subfamily: Deltocephalinae
- Tribe: Deltocephalini
- Genus: Planicephalus; Linnavuori, 1954

Genus of insects

Planicephalus is a genus in the leafhopper family Cicadellidae.

== Taxonomy ==
Planicephalus contains the following species:

- Planicephalus christinae
- Planicephalus crassistylus
- Planicephalus denticulatus
- Planicephalus ecuatorianus
- Planicephalus flavicosta
- Planicephalus flavivitta
- Planicephalus flavocostatus
- Planicephalus gamboanus
- Planicephalus luteoapicalis
- Planicephalus pallus
- Planicephalus serratus
