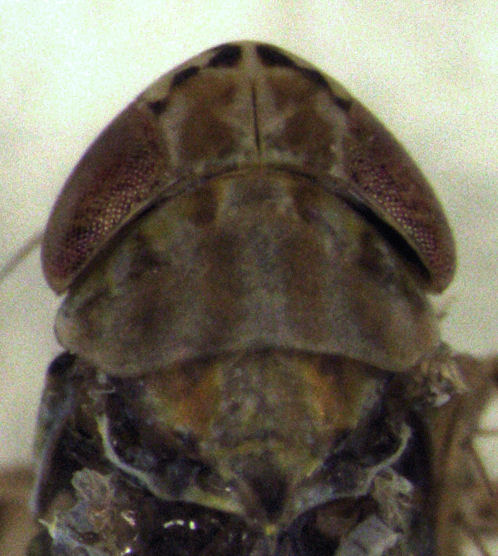
- Head, pronotum, and scutellum of Maiestas vetus

Scientific classification
- Domain: Eukaryota
- Kingdom: Animalia
- Phylum: Arthropoda
- Class: Insecta
- Order: Hemiptera
- Suborder: Auchenorrhyncha
- Family: Cicadellidae
- Subfamily: Deltocephalinae
- Tribe: Deltocephalini
- Genus: Maiestas; Distant, 1917

Type species
- Maiestas illustris Distant, 1917

Synonyms
- Togacephalus Matsumura, 1940; Inazuma Ishihara, 1953; Inemadara Ishihara, 1953; Insulanus Linnavuori, 1960 (Preocc.); Togacephala Auctt. (Lapsus calami)

= Maiestas =

Genus of true bugs

Maiestas is a genus of insects in the family Cicadellidae, the vast majority of which were formerly placed in the genus Recilia.

== Species ==
Species accepted as of February 2025:

- Maiestas affinis (Osborn, 1934)
- Maiestas agroecus (Dash & Viraktamath, 1998)
- Maiestas akashiensis (Matsumura, 1914)
- Maiestas albofasciata (Dash & Viraktamath, 1998)
- Maiestas albomaculata (Dash & Viraktamath, 1998)
- Maiestas alcanor (Linnavuori, 1969)
- Maiestas angustisecta (Linnavuori, 1962)
- Maiestas anhuiensis Xu, Shah & Duan, 2023
- Maiestas antea (Linnavuori, 1969)
- Maiestas arida (Dash & Viraktamath, 1998)
- Maiestas aulonias (Linnavuori, 1969)
- Maiestas banda (Kramer, 1962)
- Maiestas barrowensis Fletcher & Dai, 2018
- Maiestas beieri (Dlabola, 1964)
- Maiestas belonus (Dash & Viraktamath, 1998)
- Maiestas bengalensis (Dash & Viraktamath, 1998)
- Maiestas bicolor (Singh Pruthi, 1930)
- Maiestas biproducta Xing & Li, 2012
- Maiestas bispinosa (Dash & Viraktamath, 1998)
- Maiestas borealis Dutta, Kwon, Suh & Kwon, 2019
- Maiestas botelensis (Matsumura, 1940)
- Maiestas brevicula (Dash & Viraktamath, 1998)
- Maiestas brevis (Dash & Viraktamath, 1998)
- Maiestas butleri (Distant, 1918)
- Maiestas campbelli (Distant, 1918)
- Maiestas canaraica (Dash & Viraktamath, 1998)
- Maiestas canga (Kramer, 1962)
- Maiestas chalami Zahniser, McKamey & Dmitriev, 2012
- Maiestas chandrai Fletcher & Dai, 2019
- Maiestas chhota (Singh Pruthi, 1930)
- Maiestas clavata (Kramer, 1962)
- Maiestas coronata (Melichar, 1904)
- Maiestas crura Zhang & Duan, 2011
- Maiestas cuculata (Dash & Viraktamath, 1998)
- Maiestas cultella Zhang & Duan, 2011
- Maiestas dashi Webb & Viraktamath, 2009
- Maiestas deleta (Baker, 1924)
- Maiestas dex (Kramer, 1962)
- Maiestas dinghuensis Zhang & Duan, 2011
- Maiestas dispar (Kramer, 1962)
- Maiestas distincta (Motschulsky, 1859)
- Maiestas dorsalis (Motschulsky, 1859)
- Maiestas formosiellus (Matsumura, 1940)
- Maiestas glabra (Cai & Britton, 2001)
- Maiestas hastata (Dash & Viraktamath, 1998)
- Maiestas hesperidum (Lindberg, 1958)
- Maiestas heuksandoensis (Kwon & Lee, 1979)
- Maiestas hopponis (Matsumura, 1914)
- Maiestas horvathi (Then, 1896)
- Maiestas hospes (Kirkaldy, 1904)
- Maiestas illustris Distant, 1917
- Maiestas indica (Singh Pruthi, 1936)
- Maiestas irisa Zhang & Duan, 2011
- Maiestas irwini Duan, Dietrich & Zhang, 2017
- Maiestas ismenias (Linnavuori, 1969)
- Maiestas jagannathi (Dash & Viraktamath, 1995)
- Maiestas jamiensis (Matsumura, 1940)
- Maiestas jogensis (Dash & Viraktamath, 1998)
- Maiestas kalaffoensis (Heller & Linnavuori, 1968)
- Maiestas knighti Webb & Viraktamath, 2009
- Maiestas krameri (Ramasubba Rao & Ramakrishnan, 1988)
- Maiestas lactipennis (Kramer, 1962)
- Maiestas latifrons (Matsumura, 1902)
- Maiestas lineata Dmitriev, 2020
- Maiestas lobata (Linnavuori, 1961)
- Maiestas lucindae (Kirkaldy, 1907)
- Maiestas luodianensis Xing & Li, 2012
- Maiestas maculata (Singh Pruthi, 1930)
- Maiestas maritima Dutta, Kwon, Suh & Kwon, 2019
- Maiestas menoni (Ramasubba Rao & Ramakrishnan, 1990)
- Maiestas mica (Kramer, 1962)
- Maiestas nakaharae (Matsumura, 1914)
- Maiestas obongsanensis (Kwon & Lee, 1979)
- Maiestas okinawana (Matsumura, 1914)
- Maiestas oryzae (Matsumura, 1902)
- Maiestas pacifica (Osborn, 1934)
- Maiestas parajogensis Dmitriev, 2020
- Maiestas parapruthii (Chalam & Ramasubba Rao, 2005)
- Maiestas pararemigia Zhang & Duan, 2011
- Maiestas peninsularis Dutta, Kwon, Suh & Kwon, 2019
- Maiestas pileiformis Zhang & Duan, 2011
- Maiestas porticus (Melichar, 1903)
- Maiestas pruthii (Metcalf, 1967)
- Maiestas pulvisculus (Distant, 1908)
- Maiestas remigia Zhang & Duan, 2011
- Maiestas rostriformis Zhang & Duan, 2011
- Maiestas rugulans (Naudé, 1926)
- Maiestas samuelsoni (Knight, 1976)
- Maiestas scalpella Zhang & Duan, 2011
- Maiestas schaeuffelei (Heller & Linnavuori, 1968)
- Maiestas schmidtgeni (Wagner, 1939)
- Maiestas scriptus (Distant, 1908)
- Maiestas semilimax (Dash & Viraktamath, 1998)
- Maiestas serrata Duan & Dietrich, 2017
- Maiestas setosa (Ahmed, Murtaza & Malik, 1988)
- Maiestas sinuata Shah & Duan, 2021
- Maiestas spiculata (Dash & Viraktamath, 1998)
- Maiestas subsirii Duan, 2017
- Maiestas subviridis (Metcalf, 1946)
- Maiestas systenos (Dash & Viraktamath, 1998)
- Maiestas tareni (Dash & Viraktamath, 1995)
- Maiestas trifasciata (Lindberg, 1954)
- Maiestas trispinosa (Dash & Viraktamath, 1998)
- Maiestas trisuli (Dash & Viraktamath, 1998)
- Maiestas vagans (Distant, 1917)
- Maiestas variabilis (Dash & Viraktamath, 1998)
- Maiestas variegata (Anufriev, 1970)
- Maiestas veinata (Singh Pruthi, 1930)
- Maiestas vetus (Knight, 1975)
- Maiestas viraktamathi Zahniser, McKamey & Dmitriev, 2012
- Maiestas webbi Zhang & Duan, 2011
- Maiestas xanthocephalus (Dash & Viraktamath, 1998)
- Maiestas yangae Zhang & Duan, 2011

== See also ==
- Shōnen Matsumura - entomologist
