= Maiestas hospes =

Scientific classification
- Domain: Eukaryota
- Kingdom: Animalia
- Phylum: Arthropoda
- Class: Insecta
- Order: Hemiptera
- Suborder: Auchenorrhyncha
- Family: Cicadellidae
- Genus: Maiestas
- Species: M. hospes

Binomial name
- Maiestas hospes Kirkaldy, 1904

Species of true bug

Maiestas hospes is a species of bug in the family Cicadellidae that can be found in Fiji, Hawaii, New Zealand.

== Description ==
The species have brown markings on the tegmen with each cell has a dark brown outline. The colouration, is reliable and variable, determinations of which require examination of the male genitalia. It was formerly placed within Recilia, but a 2009 revision moved it to Maiestas.
