= Tetramelasma =

Scientific classification
- Domain: Eukaryota
- Kingdom: Animalia
- Phylum: Arthropoda
- Class: Insecta
- Order: Hemiptera
- Suborder: Auchenorrhyncha
- Family: Cicadellidae
- Subfamily: Deltocephalinae
- Tribe: Deltocephalini
- Genus: Tetramelasma; Stiller, 2011

Genus of true bugs

Tetramelasma is a genus of leafhoppers in the family Cicadellidae. They are endemic to South Africa.

== Species ==
- Tetramelasma litopyx Stiller, 2011
- Tetramelasma nodosatha Stiller, 2011
- Tetramelasma scolosatha Stiller, 2011
- Tetramelasma tanyphysis Stiller, 2011
