= Maiestas jogensis =

Scientific classification
- Domain: Eukaryota
- Kingdom: Animalia
- Phylum: Arthropoda
- Class: Insecta
- Order: Hemiptera
- Suborder: Auchenorrhyncha
- Family: Cicadellidae
- Genus: Maiestas
- Species: M. jogensis

Binomial name
- Maiestas jogensis (Dash & Viraktamath, 1998)

Synonyms
- Recilia jogensis

Species of true bug

Maiestas jogensis is a species of bug from the Cicadellidae family that is endemic to India. It was originally named Recilia jogensis by Dash and Viraktamath in 1998, but was moved to Maiestas following a 2009 revision.
