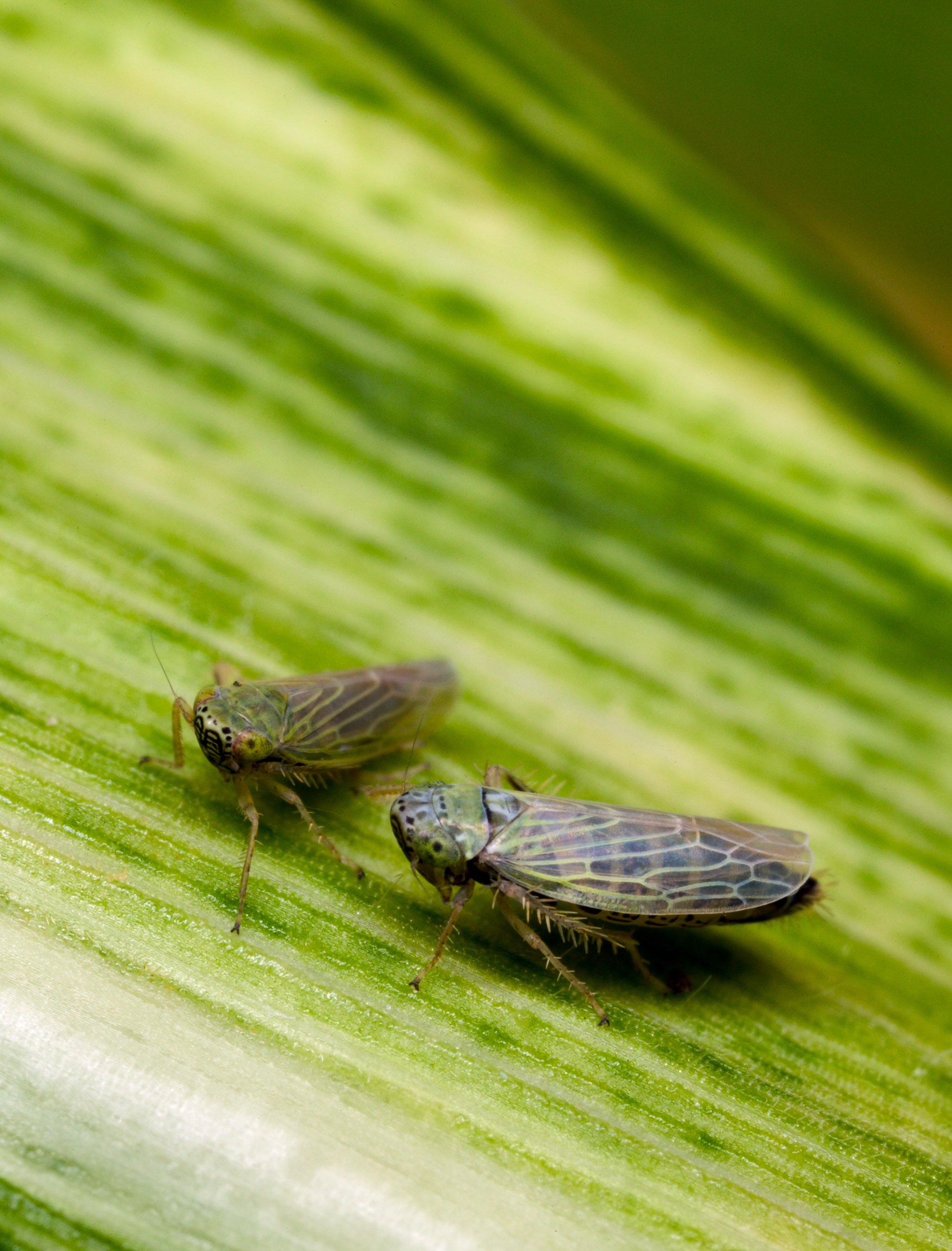
- Graminella nigrifrons

Scientific classification
- Domain: Eukaryota
- Kingdom: Animalia
- Phylum: Arthropoda
- Class: Insecta
- Order: Hemiptera
- Suborder: Auchenorrhyncha
- Family: Cicadellidae
- Tribe: Deltocephalini
- Genus: Graminella; DeLong, 1936

= Graminella =

Genus of leafhoppers

Graminella is a genus of leafhoppers in the family Cicadellidae. There are at least 30 described species in Graminella.

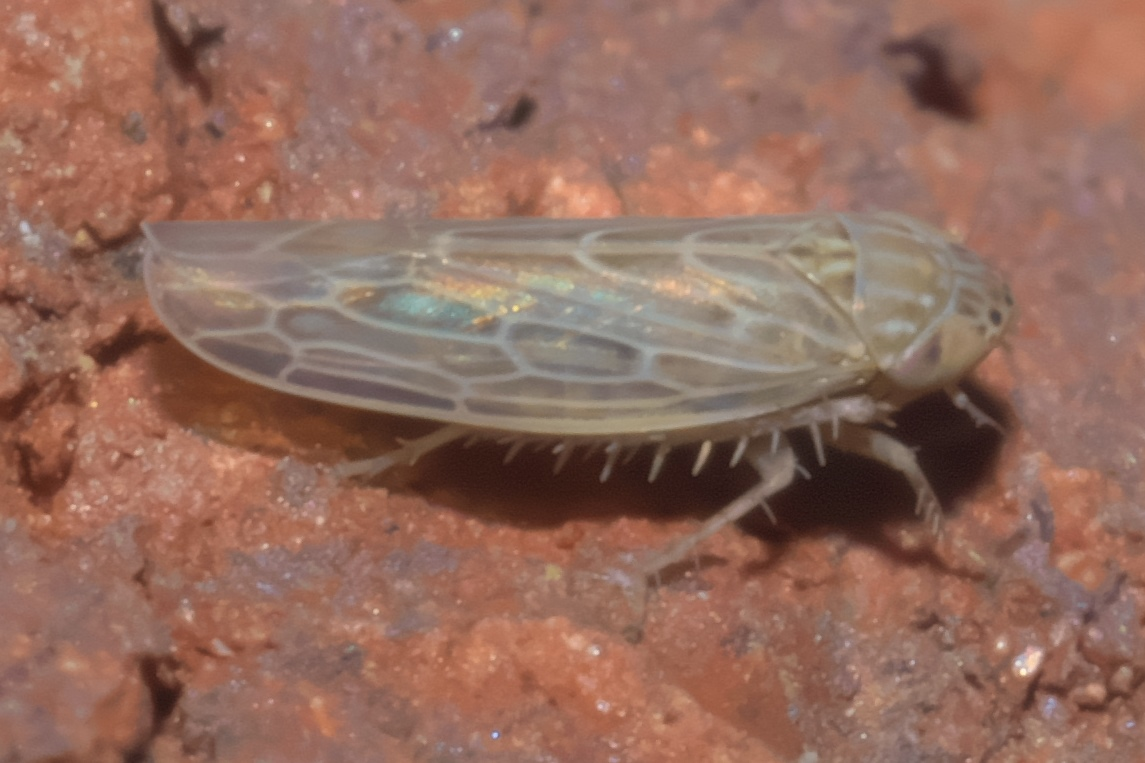
Graminella sonora

== Species ==
These 30 species belong to the genus Graminella:

- Graminella albovenosus Sanders & DeLong 1923^{c g}
- Graminella ampla Beamer 1938^{c g}
- Graminella aureovittata^{b}
- Graminella aureovittatus Sanders & DeLong 1920^{c g}
- Graminella barinasensis Freytag 1989^{c g}
- Graminella cognita Caldwell, 1952^{c g b}
- Graminella comatus Ball 1900^{c g}
- Graminella fitchii (Van Duzee, 1890)^{c g b}
- Graminella floridana DeLong & Mohr 1937^{c g}
- Graminella inca Kramer 1965^{c g}
- Graminella jimi de Menezes 1974^{c g}
- Graminella kappa Kramer 1965^{c g}
- Graminella lambda Kramer 1965^{c g}
- Graminella longifurcata Linnavuori & DeLong 1979^{c g}
- Graminella medleri Kramer 1965^{c g}
- Graminella mohri DeLong 1937^{c g}
- Graminella nielsoni Kramer 1965^{c g}
- Graminella nigrifrons Forbes, 1885^{c g b} (black-faced leafhopper)
- Graminella nigripennis DeLong 1923^{c g}
- Graminella oquaka DeLong, 1937^{c g b}
- Graminella pallidula (Osborn, 1898)^{c g b}
- Graminella plana^{b}
- Graminella planus DeLong 1924^{c g}
- Graminella punctata Caldwell 1952^{c g}
- Graminella puncticeps Linnavuori 1959^{c g}
- Graminella sonora^{b} (lesser lawn leafhopper)
- Graminella sonorus Ball 1900^{c g}
- Graminella villica^{b}
- Graminella villicus Crumb 1915^{c g}
- Graminella virginianus Sanders & DeLong 1922^{c g}

Data sources: i = ITIS, c = Catalogue of Life, g = GBIF, b = Bugguide.net
