= Maiestas dorsalis =

Scientific classification
- Domain: Eukaryota
- Kingdom: Animalia
- Phylum: Arthropoda
- Class: Insecta
- Order: Hemiptera
- Suborder: Auchenorrhyncha
- Family: Cicadellidae
- Genus: Maiestas
- Species: M. dorsalis

Binomial name
- Maiestas dorsalis Motschulsky, 1859

Synonyms
- Deltocephalus dorsalis Motschulsky, 1859; Deltocephalus fulguralis Matsumura, 1902; Inazuma dorsalis (Motschulsky, 1859); Recilia dorsalis (Motschulsky, 1859); Thamnotettix dorsalis (Motschulsky, 1859); Thamnotettix storratus Ikuma, 1903; Togacephalus dorsalis (Motschulsky, 1859)

Species of true bug

Maiestas dorsalis is a species of bug from the Cicadellidae family that may be called the "zig-zag leafhopper" and is a rice pest. It can be found in India, Japan, Korea, Malaysia, the Philippines, Sri Lanka, Borneo island, Taiwan, and Henan, province of China. It was formerly placed within Recilia and much of the rice pest information is under R. dorsalis, but a 2009 revision moved it to Maiestas.
