= Deltocephalus =

Scientific classification
- Kingdom: Animalia
- Phylum: Arthropoda
- Class: Insecta
- Order: Hemiptera
- Suborder: Auchenorrhyncha
- Family: Cicadellidae
- Tribe: Deltocephalini
- Genus: Deltocephalus; Burmeister, 1838

Synonyms
- Deltoccphalus Burmeister, 1838; Deltocephalas Burmeister, 1838; Deltocephales Burmeister, 1838; & various other orth. variants

Genus of true bugs

Deltocephalus is a leafhopper genus in the subfamily Deltocephalinae.

Deltocephalus vulgaris is a vector of the sugarcane grassy shoot disease.

== Species ==
The Global Biodiversity Information Facility lists:

1. Deltocephalus aberrans Statz, 1950
2. Deltocephalus artemisiae (Gillette & Baker, 1895)
3. Deltocephalus atrodentatus Naudé, 1926
4. Deltocephalus barcalus DeLong, 1984
5. Deltocephalus beomus Kramer, 1971
6. Deltocephalus brunnescens Distant, 1908
7. Deltocephalus buysi Kramer, 1965
8. Deltocephalus castoreus Ball, 1899
9. Deltocephalus contrerasi Van Duzee, 1923
10. Deltocephalus cotula (Cogan, 1916)
11. Deltocephalus diagnalis DeLong, 1984
12. Deltocephalus flavus Fieber, 1869
13. Deltocephalus frionus DeLong, 1984
14. Deltocephalus furciferus Jacobi, 1941
15. Deltocephalus fuscinervosus Van Duzee, 1894
16. Deltocephalus gnarus Ball, 1900
17. Deltocephalus histrionicus Kirkaldy, 1907
18. Deltocephalus immaculatus Melichar, 1914
19. Deltocephalus immaculipennis (Blanchard, 1852)
20. Deltocephalus incisurus DeLong, 1926
21. Deltocephalus jacintus DeLong, 1984
22. Deltocephalus jaraxus Kramer, 1965
23. Deltocephalus kanoniellus Matsumura, 1940
24. Deltocephalus kilimanus Jacobi, 1910
25. Deltocephalus lineatifrons Oman, 1931
26. Deltocephalus luteus Mulsant & Rey, 1855
27. Deltocephalus maculiceps Boheman, 1847
28. Deltocephalus maculipennis Statz, 1950
29. Deltocephalus maculosus Statz, 1950
30. Deltocephalus malaiasiae Jacobi, 1941
31. Deltocephalus matsumuri Baker, 1925
32. Deltocephalus metcalfi Kramer, 1965
33. Deltocephalus minutulus Förster, 1891
34. Deltocephalus minutus Van Duzee, 1890
35. Deltocephalus mystax Hamilton & Ross, 1975
36. Deltocephalus nana (Van Duzee, 1923)
37. Deltocephalus nervosus Statz, 1950
38. Deltocephalus nigriventer Sanders & DeLong, 1917
39. Deltocephalus nigriventris Kuoh, 1985
40. Deltocephalus pennatus Statz, 1950
41. Deltocephalus penonus DeLong, 1980
42. Deltocephalus posadai Kramer, 1965
43. Deltocephalus problematicus Linnavuori, 1960
44. Deltocephalus pulicaris (Fallén, 1806)
45. Deltocephalus puncticeps Jacobi, 1941
46. Deltocephalus quadriplagiatus Jacobi, 1941
47. Deltocephalus replicatus DeLong, 1984
48. Deltocephalus robustus Statz, 1950
49. Deltocephalus rottensis Statz, 1950
50. Deltocephalus saladurus Ball & DeLong, 1926
51. Deltocephalus scuticus DeLong, 1984
52. Deltocephalus serpentinus Hamilton & Ross, 1975
53. Deltocephalus spinitibialis Statz, 1950
54. Deltocephalus tobae Matsumura, 1901
55. Deltocephalus trifax Kramer, 1963
56. Deltocephalus triinfulatus Breddin, 1897
57. Deltocephalus uncinatus Zhang & Duan, 2011
58. Deltocephalus vanduzei Gillette & Baker, 1895
59. Deltocephalus vanfus Kramer, 1971
60. Deltocephalus variegatus Motschulsky, 1859
61. Deltocephalus vulgaris Dash & Viraktamath, 1998
62. Deltocephalus xipei Kramer, 1963
63. Deltocephalus youngi Kramer, 1965
64. Deltocephalus zephyrius Van Duzee, 1925
