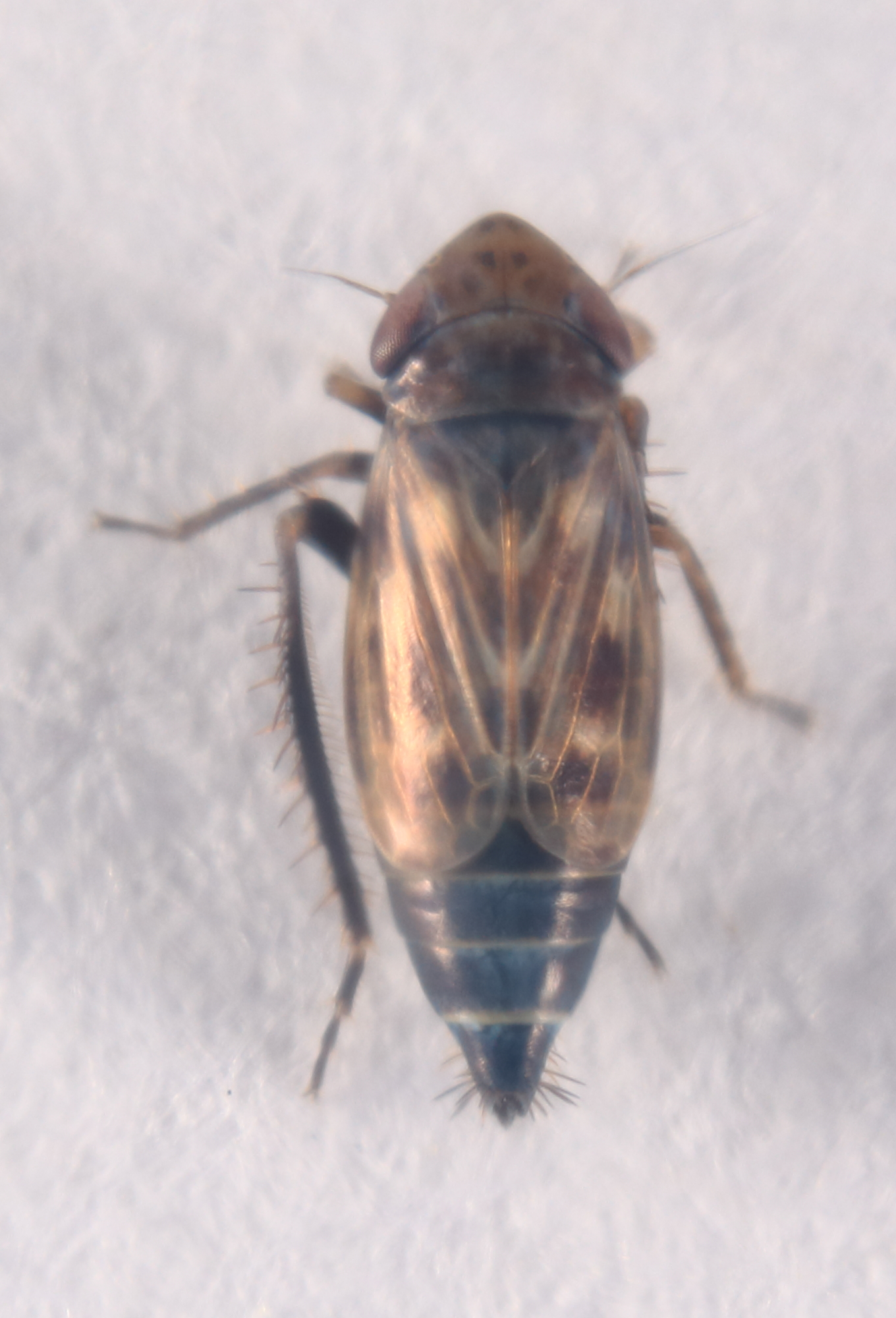
- Deltocephalus pulicaris

Scientific classification
- Domain: Eukaryota
- Kingdom: Animalia
- Phylum: Arthropoda
- Class: Insecta
- Order: Hemiptera
- Suborder: Auchenorrhyncha
- Family: Cicadellidae
- Subfamily: Deltocephalinae
- Tribe: Deltocephalini; Dallas, 1870

= Deltocephalini =

Tribe of true bugs

Deltocephalini is a tribe of leafhoppers in the subfamily Deltocephalinae. Deltocephalini contains 72 genera and more than 600 species.

== Genera ==
There are currently 72 described genera within Deltocephalini:

- Afrosus Linnavuori, 1959
- Alobaldia Emeljanov, 1972
- Alodeltocephalus Evans, 1966
- Amblysellus Sleesman, 1929
- Amplicephalus DeLong, 1926
- Arundanus DeLong, 1935
- Bolarga Oman, 1938
- Bolivaia Linnavuori & DeLong, 1979
- Cabrellus Emeljanov, 1964
- Cabrulus Oman, 1949
- Corrientesia Duan & Dietrich, 2018
- Crumbana Oman, 1949
- Cruziella Linnavuori & DeLong, 1979
- Ctenurellina McKamey, 2003
- Daltonia Oman, 1949
- Deltanus Oman, 1949
- Deltazotus Kramer, 1971
- Deltella Oman, 1949
- Deltocephalus Burmeister, 1838
- Destria Oman, 1949
- Endria Oman, 1949
- Fusanus Linnavuori, 1955
- Graminella DeLong, 1936
- Haldorus Oman, 1938
- Heidinus Theron, 1988
- Horouta Knight, 1975
- Kanorba Oman, 1938
- Kansendria Kramer, 1971
- Limpica Cheng, 1980
- Lonatura Osborn & Ball, 1898
- Lorellana DeLong & Kolbe, 1975
- Loreta Linnavuori, 1959
- Lusitanocephalus Quartau, 1970
- Maiestas Distant, 1917
- Maricaona Caldwell, 1952
- Matsumuratettix Metcalf, 1952
- Mattogrossus Linnavuori, 1959
- Mendozellus Linnavuori, 1959
- Mexara Oman, 1949
- Miradeltaphus Dash & Viraktamath, 1995
- Neodeltocephalus Linnavuori, 1959
- Nullamia DeLong, 1970
- Ochromelanus Stiller, 2011
- Onura Oman, 1938
- Paramesodes Ishihara, 1953
- Parandanus Linnavuori & DeLong, 1976
- Parayuanamia Xing & Li, 2011
- Peitouellus Vilbaste, 1969
- Phetchabunia Duan, 2017
- Picchuia Linnavuori & DeLong, 1979
- Planicephalus Linnavuori, 1954
- Polyamia DeLong, 1926
- Ragia Theron, 1973
- Recilia Edwards, 1922
- Reventazonia Linnavuori, 1959
- Salnogia Duan & Dietrich, 2018
- Sanctanus Ball, 1932
- Sanluisia Linnavuori, 1959
- Spathifer Linnavuori, 1955
- Tetramelasma Stiller, 2011
- Theronus Stiller, 2009
- Tideltellus Kramer, 1971
- Toldoanus Linnavuori, 1954
- Tumupasa Linnavuori, 1959
- Unerus DeLong, 1936
- Unoka Lawson, 1928
- Vicosa Linnavuori & DeLong, 1978
- Wakaya Linnavuori, 1960
- Warlucephala Fletcher, 2006
- Wyushinamia Zhang & Duan, 2006
- Yuanamia Zhang & Duan, 2006
