= Recilia =

Scientific classification
- Domain: Eukaryota
- Kingdom: Animalia
- Phylum: Arthropoda
- Class: Insecta
- Order: Hemiptera
- Suborder: Auchenorrhyncha
- Family: Cicadellidae
- Subfamily: Deltocephalinae
- Tribe: Deltocephalini
- Genus: Recilia; Edwards, 1922

Genus of true bugs

Recilia is a genus of typical leafhoppers from the family Cicadellidae, recorded mostly from Africa, the West Palaearctic and New Zealand. As of Webb & Viraktamath (2009), the vast majority of former species, including the zig-zag leafhopper of rice R. dorsalis, are now placed in the genus Maiestas. Before this, the genus was sometimes treated as a subgenus of Deltocephalus, of the same tribe.

== Species ==
The World Auchenorrhyncha Database includes:

1. Recilia coronifer (Marshall, 1866)
2. Recilia elongatoocellata (Motschulsky, 1859)
3. Recilia indica Rao, 1989
4. Recilia jenjouristi Zakhvatkin, 1935

Note: the zig-zag leafhopper of rice, known as R. dorsalis, is now Maiestas dorsalis (Motschulsky, 1859)
