= Paralimnini =

Scientific classification
- Kingdom: Animalia
- Phylum: Arthropoda
- Clade: Pancrustacea
- Class: Insecta
- Order: Hemiptera
- Suborder: Auchenorrhyncha
- Family: Cicadellidae
- Subfamily: Deltocephalinae
- Tribe: Paralimnini; Distant, 1908

Genera
- see text

Tribe of insects

Paralimnini is a tribe of leafhoppers in the subfamily Deltocephalinae. Paralimnini contains over 900 species divided into two subtribes: Aglenina and Paralimnina. The tribe has a cosmopolitan distribution.

== Genera ==
There are currently 139 described genera divided into two subtribes:

Currently placed in Paralimnini but unplaced to subtribe:

- Paraphysifer Sinaiko & Dietrich, 2020

Subtribe Aglenina Dmitriev, 2004

- Aglena Amyot & Serville, 1843

Subtribe Paralimnina Distant, 1908

- Acharis Emeljanov, 1966
- Adarrus Ribaut, 1946
- Aflexia Oman, 1949
- Agudus Oman, 1938
- Alapus DeLong & sleesman, 1929
- Altaiotettix Vilbaste, 1965
- Anareia Vilbaste, 1965
- Anargella Emeljanov, 1972
- Araldus Ribaut, 1946
- Arocephalus Ribaut, 1946
- Arthaldeus Ribaut, 1946
- Auridius Oman, 1949
- Bhavapura Chalam & Rama Subba Rao, 2005
- Calamotettix Emeljanov, 1959
- Caloduferna Webb, 1980
- Canariotettix Lindberg, 1954
- Caphodellus Linnavuori & DeLong, 1976
- Cazenus Oman, 1949
- Cedarotettix Theron, 1975
- Changwhania Kwon, 1980
- Chelidinus Emeljanov, 1962
- Chloothea Emeljanov, 1959
- Cleptochiton Emeljanov, 1959
- Coelestinus Emeljanov, 1962
- Coganus Theron, 1978
- Commellus Osborn & Ball, 1902
- Connectivus Xing & Li, 2012
- Cosmotettix Ribaut, 1942
- Cribrus Oman, 1949
- Ctenotettix Novikov & Anufriev, 2005
- Cumbrenanus DeLong & Cwikla, 1984
- Destitutus Xing & Li, 2011
- Diplocolenus Ribaut, 1946
- Ebarrius Ribaut, 1946
- Elginus Theron, 1975
- Emeljanovianus Dlabola, 1965
- Enantiocephalus Haupt, 1926
- Errastunus Ribaut, 1946
- Erzaleus Ribaut, 1952
- Falcitettix Linnavuori, 1953
- Flexamia DeLong, 1926
- Flexarida Whitcomb & Hicks, 1993
- Futasujinoidella Kwon & Lee, 1979
- Futasujinus Ishihara, 1953
- Giprus Oman, 1949
- Gobicuellus Dlabola, 1967
- Goldeus Ribaut, 1946
- Hebecephalus DeLong, 1926
- Hebexa Oman, 1949
- Hengchunia Vilbaste, 1969
- Henschia Lethierry, 1892
- Hiltus Theron, 1974
- Histipagus Remane & Asche, 1980
- Ibadarrus Remane & Asche, 1980
- Jannius Theron, 1982
- Jassargus Zachvatkin, 1933
- Jilinga Ghauri, 1974
- Kaszabinus Dlabola, 1965
- Kazachstanicus Dlabola, 1961
- Ladya Theron, 1982
- Laevicephalus DeLong, 1926
- Latalus DeLong & Sleesman, 1929
- Lebradea Remane, 1959
- Lecacis Theron, 1982
- Lemellus Oman, 1949
- Maximianus Distant, 1918
- Mayawa Fletcher, 2000
- Mendrausus Ribaut, 1946
- Mendreus Ribaut, 1946
- Mesolimnella Dlabola, 1994
- Metagoldeus Remane & Asche, 1980
- Metalimnus Ribaut, 1948
- Micrelloides Evans, 1973
- Micropedeticus Stiller, 2009
- Miraldus Lindberg, 1960
- Mocuola Emeljanov, 1964
- Mogangella Dlabola, 1957
- Mogangina Emeljanov, 1962
- Mongolojassus Zachvatkin, 1953
- Multiproductus Xing, Dai & Li, 2011
- Myittana Distant, 1908
- Nanosius Dlabola, 1974
- Naudeus Theron, 1982
- Nicolaus Lindberg, 1958
- Orocastus Oman, 1949
- Pantallus Emeljanov, 1961
- Paraglena Emeljanov, 1997
- Paragygrus Emeljanov, 1964
- Paralaevicephalus Ishihara, 1953
- Paralimnellus Emeljanov, 1972
- Paralimnoidella Kwon & Lee, 1979
- Paralimnus Matsumura, 1902
- Paramesanus Dlabola, 1979
- Paramesus Fieber, 1866
- Parapotes Emeljanov, 1975
- Pasaremus Oman, 1949
- Pazu Oman, 1949
- Peconus Oman, 1949
- Philaia Dlabola, 1952
- Phlebiastes Emeljanov, 1961
- Pinumius Ribaut, 1946
- Platentomus Theron, 1980
- Pleargus Emeljanov, 1964
- Praganus Dlabola, 1949
- Pravistylus Theron, 1975
- Prosperellus Emeljanov, 1999
- Psammotettix Haupt, 1929
- Pseudolausulus Wagner & Franz, 1961
- Pteropyx Haupt, 1927
- Quartausius Dlabola, 1974
- Quaziptus Kramer, 1965
- Restiobia Davies, 1988
- Rhoananus Dlabola, 1949
- Rodezotettix Della Giustina & Wilson, 1995
- Rosenus Oman, 1949
- Samuraba Linnavuori, 1961
- Savanicus Dlabola, 1977
- Secopennis DeLong & Sleesman, 1929
- Sestrelicola Remane & Asche, 1980
- Sicistella Emeljanov, 1972
- Soracte Kirkaldy, 1907
- Soractellus Evans, 1966
- Sorhoanus Ribaut, 1946
- Spartopyge Young & Beirne, 1958
- Subhimalus Ghauri, 1971
- Takagiella Vilbaste, 1969
- Teinopterus Stiller, 2011
- Telusus Oman, 1949
- Tiaratus Emeljanov, 1961
- Tigriculus Dlabola, 1961
- Triasargus Novikov & Anufriev, 2005
- Tytthuspilus Stiller, 2011
- Umeqi Stiller, 2011
- Urganus Dlabola, 1965
- Vecaulis Theron, 1975
- Verdanus Oman, 1949
- Vilargus Theron, 1975
- Yanocephalus Ishihara, 1953
