= Psammotettix cahuilla =

Scientific classification
- Kingdom: Animalia
- Phylum: Arthropoda
- Clade: Pancrustacea
- Class: Insecta
- Order: Hemiptera
- Suborder: Auchenorrhyncha
- Family: Cicadellidae
- Genus: Psammotettix
- Species: P. cahuilla

Binomial name
- Psammotettix cahuilla Van Duzee, 1925

Species of true bugs

Psammotettix cahuilla is a genus of true bugs, belonging to the family Cicadellidae. It was first described by American entomologist Edward P. Van Duzee in 1925.
