= Arthaldeus =

Scientific classification
- Domain: Eukaryota
- Kingdom: Animalia
- Phylum: Arthropoda
- Class: Insecta
- Order: Hemiptera
- Suborder: Auchenorrhyncha
- Family: Cicadellidae
- Subfamily: Deltocephalinae
- Tribe: Paralimnini
- Genus: Arthaldeus; Ribaut, 1946

Genus of true bugs

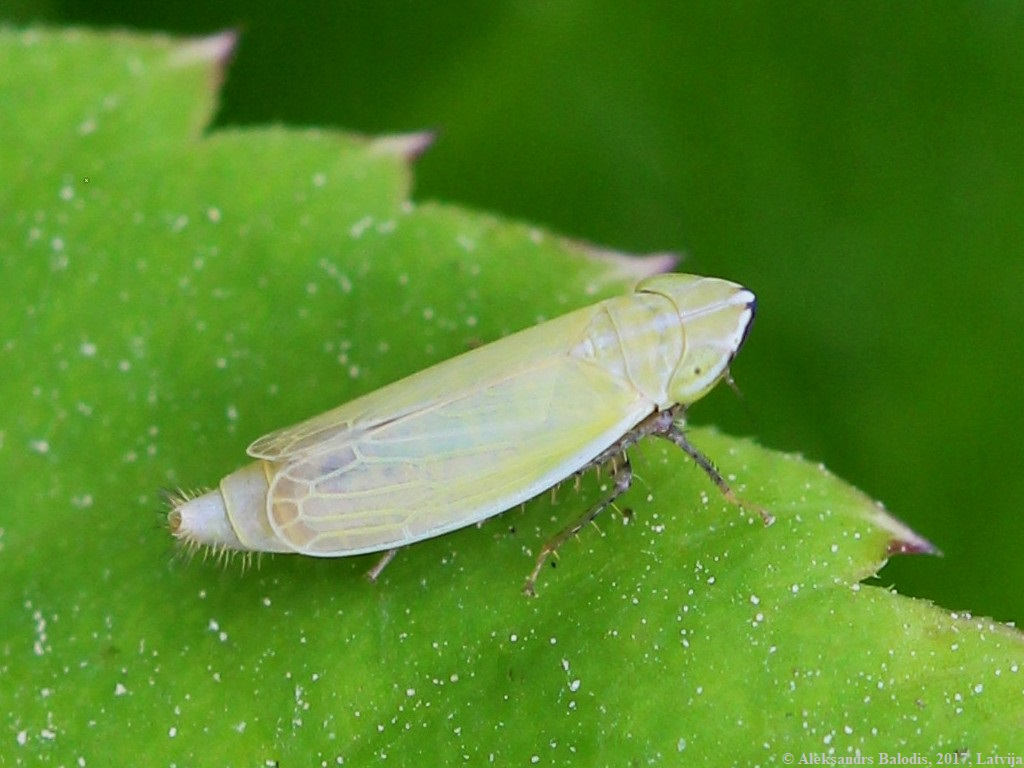

Arthaldeus is a genus of true bugs belonging to the family Cicadellidae.

The genus was first described by Ribaut in 1946.

The species of this genus are found in Europe and Northern America.

Species:

- Arthaldeus pascuella Fallén, 1826
