= Nicolaus (leafhopper) =

Scientific classification
- Kingdom: Animalia
- Phylum: Arthropoda
- Class: Insecta
- Order: Hemiptera
- Suborder: Auchenorrhyncha
- Family: Cicadellidae
- Tribe: Paralimnini
- Genus: Nicolaus; Lindberg, 1958

Synonyms
- Jubrinia Linnavuori, 1962

Genus of true bugs

Nicolaus is a genus of true bugs belonging to the family Cicadellidae. The genus was first described by Lindberg, 1958.

== Species ==
These species belong to the genus Nicolaus':

- Nicolaus abuensis Viraktamath & Webb, 2014
- Nicolaus ancoratus Stiller, 1998
- Nicolaus aratus Stiller, 1998
- Nicolaus atrogilvus Stiller, 1998
- Nicolaus attenuatus Stiller, 1998
- Nicolaus bidentatus Viraktamath & Webb, 2014
- Nicolaus bihamatus Xing & Li, 2024
- Nicolaus camena (Linnavuori, 1969)
- Nicolaus cornutus Viraktamath & Webb, 2014
- Nicolaus dentatus (Theron, 1971)
- Nicolaus dilatodentatus Stiller, 1998
- Nicolaus distinctus (Linnavuori, 1962)
- Nicolaus gracilis (Heller & Linnavuori, 1968)
- Nicolaus gracilitas Stiller, 1998
- Nicolaus hamatus Stiller, 1998
- Nicolaus inaffectus Stiller, 1998
- Nicolaus ineptedentatus Stiller, 1998
- Nicolaus infirmadentatus Stiller, 1998
- Nicolaus minor Stiller, 1998
- Nicolaus notafulvatus Stiller, 1998
- Nicolaus quadrispinosus Stiller, 1998
- Nicolaus serratus Viraktamath & Webb, 2014
- Nicolaus simplex Stiller, 1998
- Nicolaus spinosissimus Stiller, 1998
- Nicolaus sursumdentatus Stiller, 1998
- Nicolaus tenax Stiller, 1998
- Nicolaus trispinatus Stiller, 1998
- Nicolaus virgator Stiller, 1998
- Nicolaus xerophilus Lindberg, 1958
