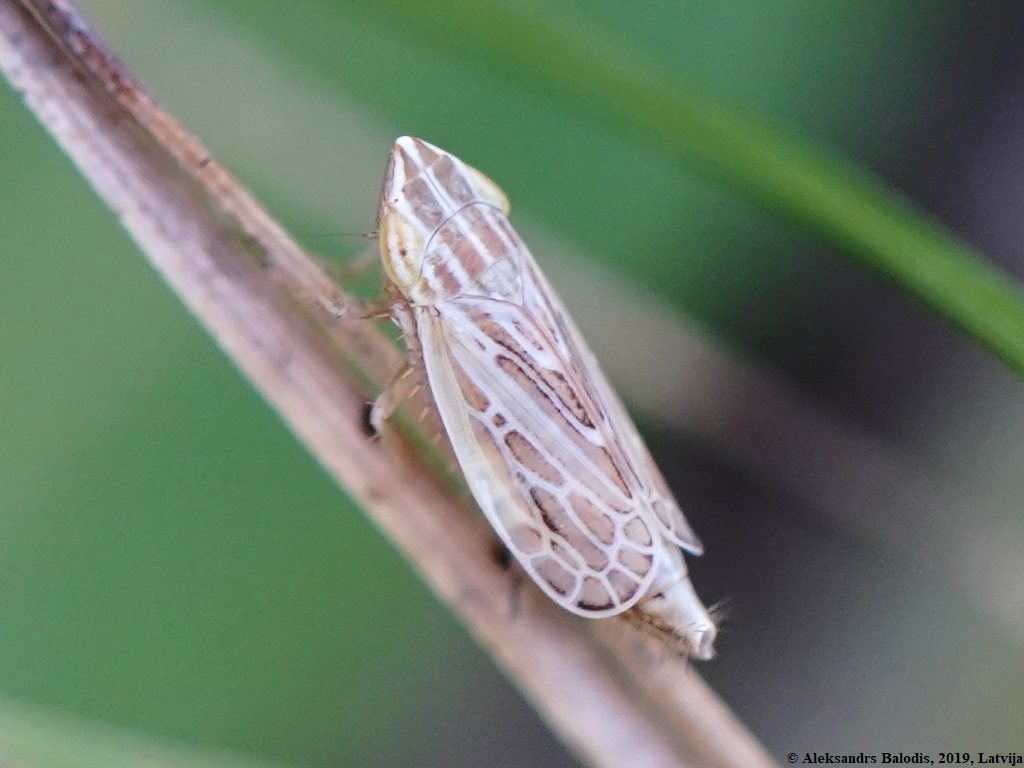

Scientific classification
- Domain: Eukaryota
- Kingdom: Animalia
- Phylum: Arthropoda
- Class: Insecta
- Order: Hemiptera
- Suborder: Auchenorrhyncha
- Family: Cicadellidae
- Subfamily: Deltocephalinae
- Tribe: Paralimnini
- Genus: Arocephalus; Ribaut, 1946

= Arocephalus =

Genus of true bugs

Arocephalus is a genus of true bugs belonging to the family Cicadellidae.

The genus was first described by Ribaut in 1946.

The species of this genus are found in Europe.

Species:

- Arocephalus punctum Flor, 1861
