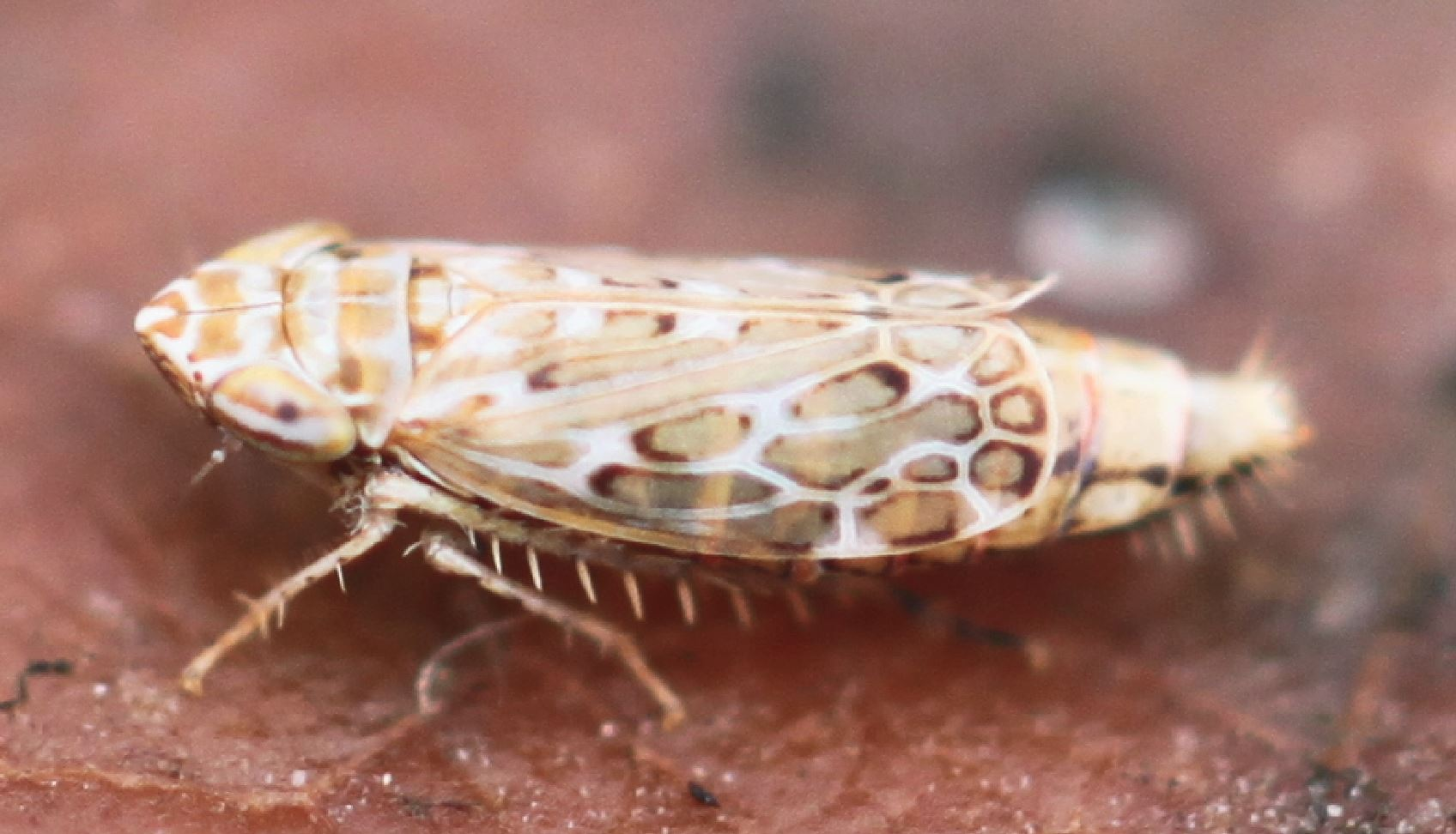
- Jassargus cf. obtusivalvis am 5. Dezember 2018 in Walldorf/Baden

Scientific classification
- Kingdom: Animalia
- Phylum: Arthropoda
- Clade: Pancrustacea
- Class: Insecta
- Order: Hemiptera
- Suborder: Auchenorrhyncha
- Family: Cicadellidae
- Tribe: Paralimnini
- Genus: Jassargus; Zachvatkine, 1934

Type species
- Jassus distinguendus Flor, 1861

= Jassargus =

Genus of true bugs

Jassargus is a genus of leafhoppers belonging to the family Cicadellidae. The genus was first described by Zachvatkin in 1934. The species of this genus are found in Europe, Asia, Algeria, Greenland and Canada.

== Species ==
There are currently over 20 described species in Jassargus:

- Jassargus allobrogicus (Ribaut, 1936)
- Jassargus alpinus Then, 1896
- Jassargus altaicus Vilbaste, 1965
- Jassargus bavaricus (Ribaut, 1936)
- Jassargus bisubulatus (Then, 1896)
- Jassargus caucasicus Logvinenko, 1966
- Jassargus cordiger (Ribaut, 1936)
- Jassargus cylindrius Singh, 1969
- Jassargus danielssoni Dlabola, 1987
- Jassargus dentatus D'Urso, 1980
- Jassargus heptapotamicus Mitjaev, 1967
- Jassargus japheticus Emeljanov, 1966
- Jassargus lagrecai D'Urso, 1982
- Jassargus lunaris Logvinenko, 1961
- Jassargus prometheus Gnezdilov, 1997
- Jassargus pseudocellaris (Flor, 1861)
- Jassargus recens Logvinenko, 1983
- Jassargus refractus Logvinenko, 1965
- Jassargus remanei Quartau, 1986
- Jassargus remotus (Hamilton, 1987)
- Jassargus sursumflexus (Then, 1901)
- Jassargus svaneticus Gnezdilov, 1997
