= Adarrus bellevoyei =

Scientific classification
- Domain: Eukaryota
- Kingdom: Animalia
- Phylum: Arthropoda
- Class: Insecta
- Order: Hemiptera
- Suborder: Auchenorrhyncha
- Family: Cicadellidae
- Genus: Adarrus
- Species: A. bellevoyei

Binomial name
- Adarrus bellevoyei (Puton, 1877)

Species of true bug

Adarrus bellevoyei is a species of true bug belonging to the family Cicadellidae.

Synonym:

- Deltocephalus bellevoyei Puton, 1877 (= basionym)
