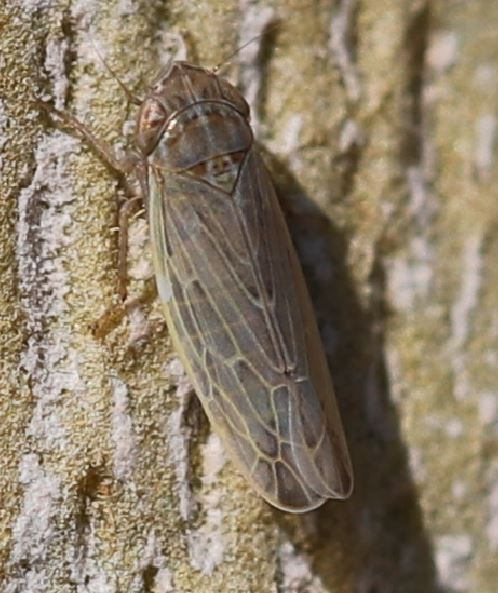
- Psammotettix cf. alienus confinis

Scientific classification
- Kingdom: Animalia
- Phylum: Arthropoda
- Clade: Pancrustacea
- Class: Insecta
- Order: Hemiptera
- Suborder: Auchenorrhyncha
- Family: Cicadellidae
- Subfamily: Deltocephalinae
- Genus: Psammotettix; Haupt, 1929

= Psammotettix =

Genus of true bugs

Psammotettix is a genus of true bugs belonging to the family Cicadellidae and tribe Paralimnini. The species of this genus are found in Eurasia and North America

== Species ==
The following species are recognised in the genus Psammotettix:

- Psammotettix adriaticus Wagner, 1959
- Psammotettix agrestis Logvinenko, 1966
- Psammotettix agricola Vilbaste, 1980
- Psammotettix alaicus Dubovsky, 1966
- Psammotettix albomarginatus Wagner, 1941
- Psammotettix alexanderi Greene, 1971
- Psammotettix alexandri Korolevskaya, 1968
- Psammotettix aliena Dahlbom, 1850
- Psammotettix alienulus Vilbaste, 1980
- Psammotettix alimdzhanovi Dubovsky, 1966
- Psammotettix altimontanus Mitjaev, 1969
- Psammotettix amplus DeLong & Davidson, 1935
- Psammotettix amurensis Anufriev, 1976
- Psammotettix angulatus Then, 1899
- Psammotettix arcuatus Ribaut, 1938
- Psammotettix asper Ribaut, 1925
- Psammotettix aspromontanus Poggi, Manti & Castiglione, 2019
- Psammotettix atropidicola Emeljanov, 1962
- Psammotettix atropidis Emeljanov, 1962
- Psammotettix attenuens DeLong & Davidson, 1935
- Psammotettix beirnei Greene, 1971
- Psammotettix cahuilla Van Duzee, 1925
- Psammotettix cephalotes Herrich-Schaeffer, 1834
- Psammotettix cerinus Lindberg, 1948
- Psammotettix comitans Emeljanov, 1964
- Psammotettix confinis Dahlbom, 1850
- Psammotettix correctus Emeljanov, 1972
- Psammotettix crypticus Emeljanov, 1972
- Psammotettix danieli Dlabola, 1971
- Psammotettix dealbatus Emeljanov, 1964
- Psammotettix dentatus Knull, 1954
- Psammotettix diademata Hamilton, 2002
- Psammotettix dubius Ossiannilsson, 1974
- Psammotettix dubovskii Vilbaste, 1960
- Psammotettix emarginata Singh, 1969
- Psammotettix erraticus Linnavuori, 1965
- Psammotettix excavatus Oman, 1931
- Psammotettix excisus Matsumura, 1906
- Psammotettix frigidus Boheman, 1845
- Psammotettix furcatus Logvinenko, 1977
- Psammotettix gracilis Logvinenko, 1971
- Psammotettix greenei Hamilton, 2002
- Psammotettix helvolus Kirschbaum, 1868
- Psammotettix hungaricus Orosz, 1981
- Psammotettix ibericus Remane, 1965
- Psammotettix inexpectatus Remane, 1965
- Psammotettix insulae Lindberg, 1958
- Psammotettix jachontovi Dubovsky, 1966
- Psammotettix jurii Logvinenko, 1977
- Psammotettix kamtshaticus Vilbaste, 1980
- Psammotettix kaszabi Dlabola, 1961
- Psammotettix knullae Greene, 1971
- Psammotettix koeleriae Zachvatkin, 1948
- Psammotettix kolosvarensis Matsumura, 1908
- Psammotettix koreanus Matsumura, 1915
- Psammotettix kublaichani Dlabola, 1967
- Psammotettix kurilensis Anufriev, 1976
- Psammotettix lapponicus Ossiannilsson, 1938
- Psammotettix lividella Zetterstedt, 1840
- Psammotettix maculatus Kuoh, 1985
- Psammotettix majusculus Linnavuori, 1951
- Psammotettix makarovi Moravskaja, 1952
- Psammotettix maritimus Perris, 1857
- Psammotettix mexcala DeLong, 1973
- Psammotettix mongoleriae Dlabola, 1966
- Psammotettix mongolicus Dlabola, 1967
- Psammotettix monticola Dubovsky, 1966
- Psammotettix monticulinus Emeljanov, 1964
- Psammotettix najlae Abdul-Nour, 1986
- Psammotettix nardeti Remane, 1965
- Psammotettix narsikulovi Dlabola, 1960
- Psammotettix nemourensis Matsumura, 1908
- Psammotettix nesiotus Hamilton, 2002
- Psammotettix nodosus Ribaut, 1925
- Psammotettix notatus Melichar, 1896
- Psammotettix orientalior Zachvatkin, 1945
- Psammotettix ornaticeps Horváth, 1897
- Psammotettix pallens Vilbaste, 1980
- Psammotettix pallidinervis Dahlbom, 1850
- Psammotettix parvipenis Remane, 1965
- Psammotettix pelikani Dlabola, 1965
- Psammotettix perpictus Logvinenko, 1978
- Psammotettix pictipennis Kirschbaum, 1868
- Psammotettix poecilus Flor, 1861
- Psammotettix prolongatus Dlabola, 1979
- Psammotettix provincialis (Ribaut, 1925)
- Psammotettix putoni Then, 1898
- Psammotettix queketus Kuoh, 1981
- Psammotettix quettensis Ara & M.Ahmed, 1988
- Psammotettix regularia Singh, 1969
- Psammotettix remanei Orosz, 1999
- Psammotettix revae Knull, 1954
- Psammotettix robustus Emeljanov, 1966
- Psammotettix rudis Emeljanov, 1972
- Psammotettix rupicola Logvinenko, 1965
- Psammotettix sabulicola Curtis, 1837
- Psammotettix salinus Vilbaste, 1980
- Psammotettix salsuginosus Logvinenko, 1961
- Psammotettix saxatilis Emeljanov, 1962
- Psammotettix seriphidii Emeljanov, 1962
- Psammotettix shensis Kuoh, 1981
- Psammotettix shoshone DeLong & Davidson, 1934
- Psammotettix sierraenevadae Dlabola, 1980
- Psammotettix slovacus Dlabola, 1949
- Psammotettix striata Linnaeus, 1758
- Psammotettix striatus
- Psammotettix stummeri Horváth, 1904
- Psammotettix swatensis M.Ahmed, 1986
- Psammotettix totalus DeLong & Davidson, 1935
- Psammotettix transcaucasicus Dlabola, 1961
- Psammotettix unciger Ribaut, 1938
- Psammotettix vilbastei Dubovsky, 1966
- Psammotettix viridiconfinis Remane, 1965
- Psammotettix viridinervis Ross & Hamilton, 1972
- Psammotettix volgensis Pridantzeva, 1968
- Psammotettix zaisanensis Mitjaev, 1971
- Psammotettix zhangi Yang
- Psammotettix regularia Singh, 1969
- Psammotettix regularia Singh, 1969
- Psammotettix regularia Singh, 1969
- Psammotettix regularia Singh, 1969
