= Calamotettix =

Scientific classification
- Kingdom: Animalia
- Phylum: Arthropoda
- Class: Insecta
- Order: Hemiptera
- Suborder: Auchenorrhyncha
- Family: Cicadellidae
- Tribe: Paralimnini
- Genus: Calamotettix; Emeljanov, 1959

Genus of true bugs

Calamotettix is a genus of true bugs belonging to the family Cicadellidae.

The genus was first described by Emeljanov in 1959.

The species of this genus are found in Europe.

Species:

- Calamotettix taeniatus Horváth, 1911
