= Paralimnus =

Scientific classification
- Kingdom: Animalia
- Phylum: Arthropoda
- Clade: Pancrustacea
- Class: Insecta
- Order: Hemiptera
- Suborder: Auchenorrhyncha
- Family: Cicadellidae
- Genus: Paralimnus; Matsumura, 1902

Genus of true bugs

Paralimnus is a genus of true bugs belonging to the family Cicadellidae.

The species of this genus are found in Europe and Russia.

Species:

- Paralimnus albipunctatus Mitjaev, 1967
- Paralimnus angusticeps Zachvatkin, 1953
