= Adarrus =

Scientific classification
- Domain: Eukaryota
- Kingdom: Animalia
- Phylum: Arthropoda
- Class: Insecta
- Order: Hemiptera
- Suborder: Auchenorrhyncha
- Family: Cicadellidae
- Genus: Adarrus; Ribaut, 1946

Genus of true bugs

Adarrus is a genus of true bugs belonging to the family Cicadellidae.

The genus was first described by H. Ribaut in 1946.

The species of this genus are found in Europe.

Species:

- Adarrus bellevoyei Puton, 1877
