= Cosmotettix =

Scientific classification
- Domain: Eukaryota
- Kingdom: Animalia
- Phylum: Arthropoda
- Class: Insecta
- Order: Hemiptera
- Suborder: Auchenorrhyncha
- Family: Cicadellidae
- Genus: Cosmotettix; Ribaut, 1942

Genus of true bugs

Cosmotettix is a genus of true bugs belonging to the family Cicadellidae.

The species of this genus are found in Europe and Northern America.

Species:

- Cosmotettix costalis
- Cosmotettix edwardsi

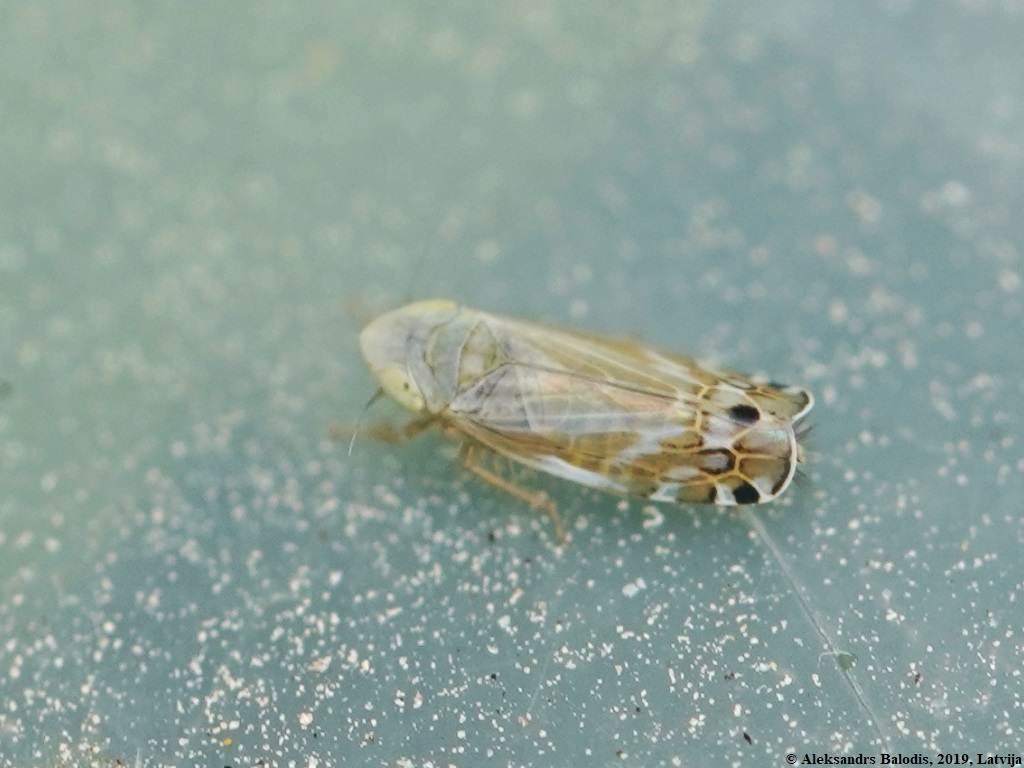
Cosmotettix costalis
