= Sorhoanus =

Scientific classification
- Kingdom: Animalia
- Phylum: Arthropoda
- Class: Insecta
- Order: Hemiptera
- Suborder: Auchenorrhyncha
- Family: Cicadellidae
- Genus: Sorhoanus; Ribaut, 1946

Genus of true bugs

Sorhoanus is a genus of true bugs belonging to the family Cicadellidae.

The species of this genus are found in Eurasia and Northern America.

Species:

- Sorhoanus arsenjevi Anufriev, 1978
- Sorhoanus assimilis Fallén, 1806
