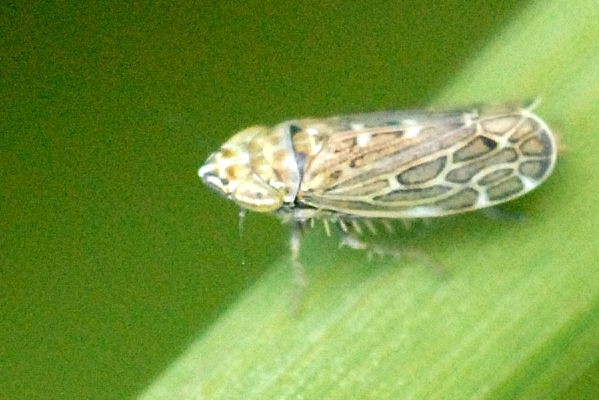
- Errastunus ocellaris

Scientific classification
- Domain: Eukaryota
- Kingdom: Animalia
- Phylum: Arthropoda
- Class: Insecta
- Order: Hemiptera
- Suborder: Auchenorrhyncha
- Family: Cicadellidae
- Genus: Errastunus; Ribaut, 1946

= Errastunus =

Genus of true bugs

Errastunus is a genus of true bugs belonging to the family Cicadellidae.

The species of this genus are found in Europe and Northern America.

Species:

- Errastunus daedaleus Logvinenko, 1966
- Errastunus leucophaeus (Kirschbaum, 1868)
