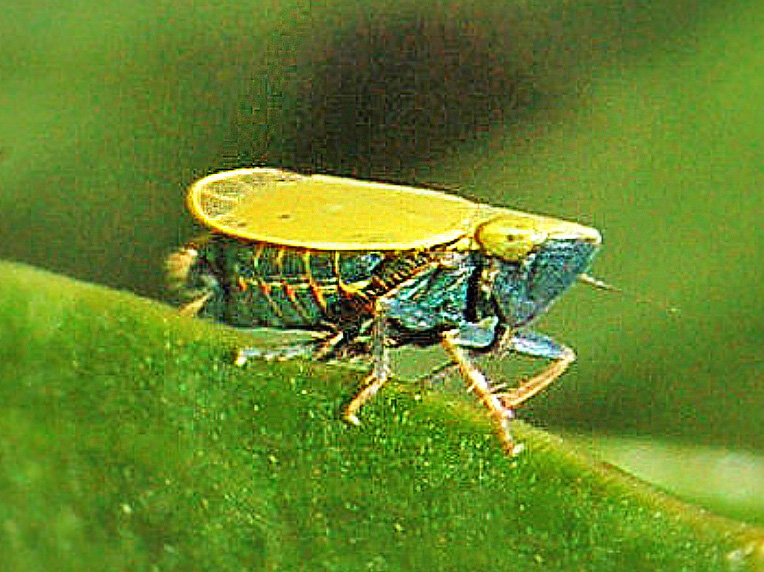
- Verdanus species

Scientific classification
- Domain: Eukaryota
- Kingdom: Animalia
- Phylum: Arthropoda
- Class: Insecta
- Order: Hemiptera
- Suborder: Auchenorrhyncha
- Family: Cicadellidae
- Genus: Verdanus; Oman, 1949

Synonyms
- Acocephalus sudeticus Kolenati 1860; Bythoscopus penthopitta Walker 1851; Cicada limbatellus Zetterstedt 1828; Deltocephalus bohemicus Lang 1947; Deltocephalus humida Lang 1947; Deltocephalus monticola Linnavuori 1958; Deltocephalus nasti Wagner 1939; Deltocephalus obenbergeri Dlabola 1945; Deltocephalus quadrivirgatus Horvath 1884; Deltocephalus unicolo Lang 1947

= Verdanus =

Genus of true bugs

Verdanus is a genus of true bugs belonging to the family Cicadellidae.

== Taxonomy ==
The genus Verdanus was established by Oman (1949). The author distinguished Verdanus from the genus Diplocolenus on the base of aedeagal differences. Several authors considered it a subgenus of Diplocolenus. The genus Verdanus includes two subgenera, Verdanus and Erdianus.

== Distribution and habitat ==
The species of this holarctic genus are mainly found in Eurasia and Northern America, especially in meadows of the mountain regions.

== Species ==
Species within this genus include:

- Verdanus abdominalis (Fabricius, 1803)
- Verdanus bensoni China, 1933)
- Verdanus caucasicus (Emeljanov 1962)
- Verdanus ciscaucasicus (Emeljanov, 1964
- Verdanus evansi (Ashmead, 1904)
- Verdanus hardei (Dlabola 1980) 80
- Verdanus intermedius (Emeljanov 1964)
- Verdanus limbatellus (Zetterstedt 1828)
- Verdanus logvinenkoae (Emeljanov 1964)
- Verdanus monticola (Linnavuori 1958)
- Verdanus nigricans (Kirschbaum 1868)
- Verdanus obenbergeri Dlabola 1945
- Verdanus orientalis (Ribaut 1936)
- Verdanus oseticus (Emeljanov 1964)
- Verdanus pazoukii Dlabola 1980
- Verdanus penthopitta (Walker 1851)
- Verdanus quadrivirgatus (Horvath 1884)

== Description ==
Verdanus species can reach a body length of about 3–5 mm (0.12–0.20 in). These leafhoppers are pale green with dark brown or black venter and legs. In Eridianus subgenus, aedeagus shows a basal apodeme strongly produced laterally, while connective have arms parallel distally and fused over part of length. Verdanus subgenus has a long and narrow aedeagus and connective with arms divergent distally and abructly angled to midline.

== Biology ==
Adults are on wing from mid March to mid August.
