= Metalimnus =

Scientific classification
- Domain: Eukaryota
- Kingdom: Animalia
- Phylum: Arthropoda
- Class: Insecta
- Order: Hemiptera
- Suborder: Auchenorrhyncha
- Family: Cicadellidae
- Genus: Metalimnus; Ribaut, 1948

Genus of true bugs

Metalimnus is a genus of true bugs belonging to the family Cicadellidae.

The species of this genus are found in Europe and Japan.

Species:

- Metalimnus formosus Boheman, 1845
- Metalimnus marmorata Flor, 1861
