= Memnonia =

Memnonia or Memnonium may refer to:

== Places ==
- Memnonia quadrangle, a region of Mars
- Memnonia Institute, defunct health institute in Yellow Springs, Ohio, opened by Mary Gove Nichols
- Monuments in Egypt described by Strabo (XVII.42) as a Memnonium
  - the Labyrinth
  - sites in Abydos
  - sites in Thebes
- Memnonium, name used by travelers and visitors to Thebes, Egypt for the ruins of the Ramesseum around 1750-1850 (including variants like Temple of Memnon or Memnonia)

== Taxonomy ==
- Memnonia (leafhopper), a leafhopper genus in the subfamily Deltocephalinae
- Bactrocera memnonia, a fruit fly species in the genus Bactrocera
- Castianeira memnonia, a large brown-black clubionid spider species in the genus Castianeira
- Rhynchosia memnonia, a plant species in the genus Rhynchosia
- Memnonium (fungus), a genus of fungi in the Piedraiaceae family
