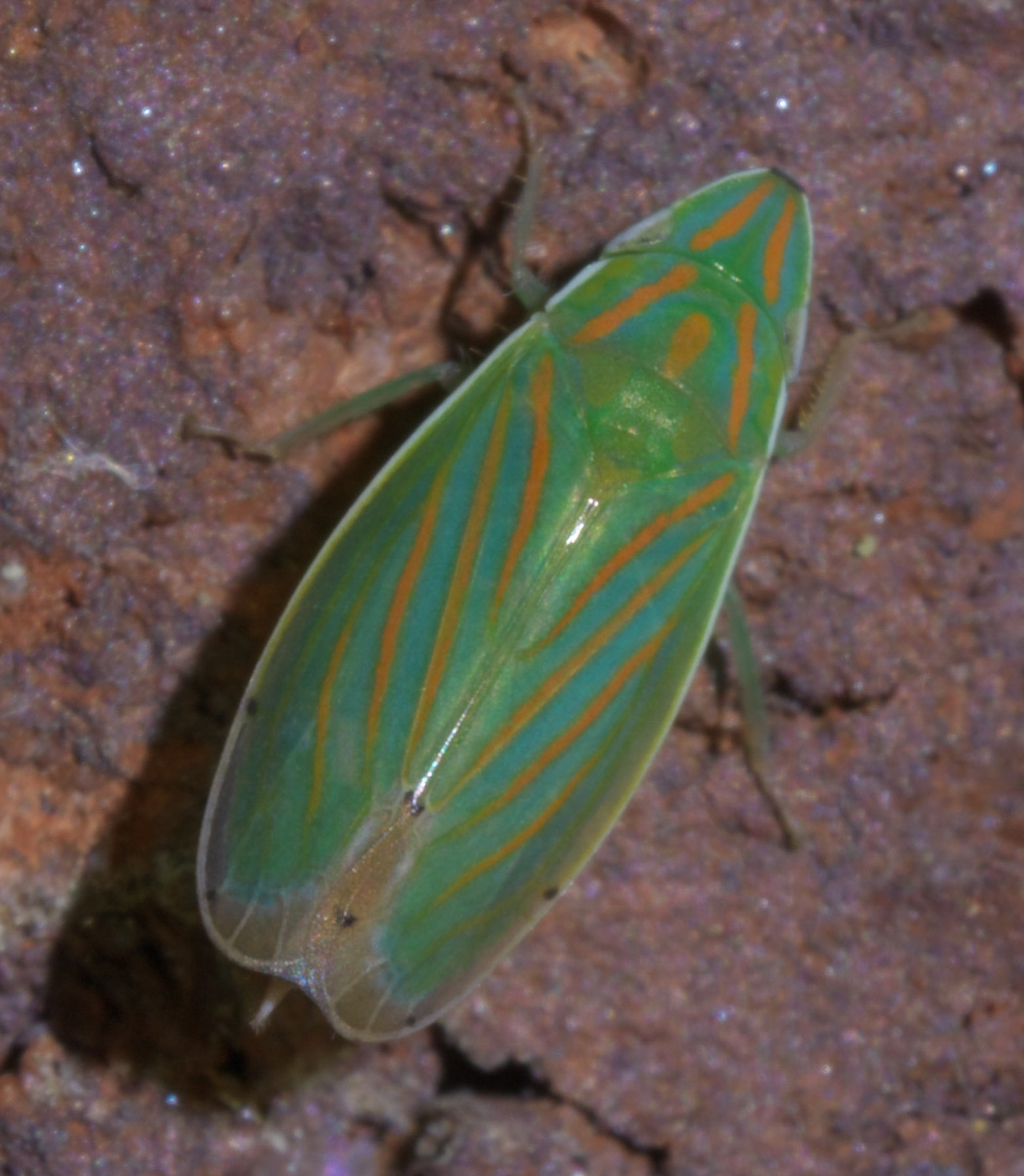

Scientific classification
- Kingdom: Animalia
- Phylum: Arthropoda
- Clade: Pancrustacea
- Class: Insecta
- Order: Hemiptera
- Suborder: Auchenorrhyncha
- Family: Cicadellidae
- Genus: Spangbergiella
- Species: S. viridis

Binomial name
- Spangbergiella viridis (Provancher, 1872)

= Spangbergiella viridis =

Species of true bug

Spangbergiella viridis is a species of leafhopper in the family Cicadellidae.

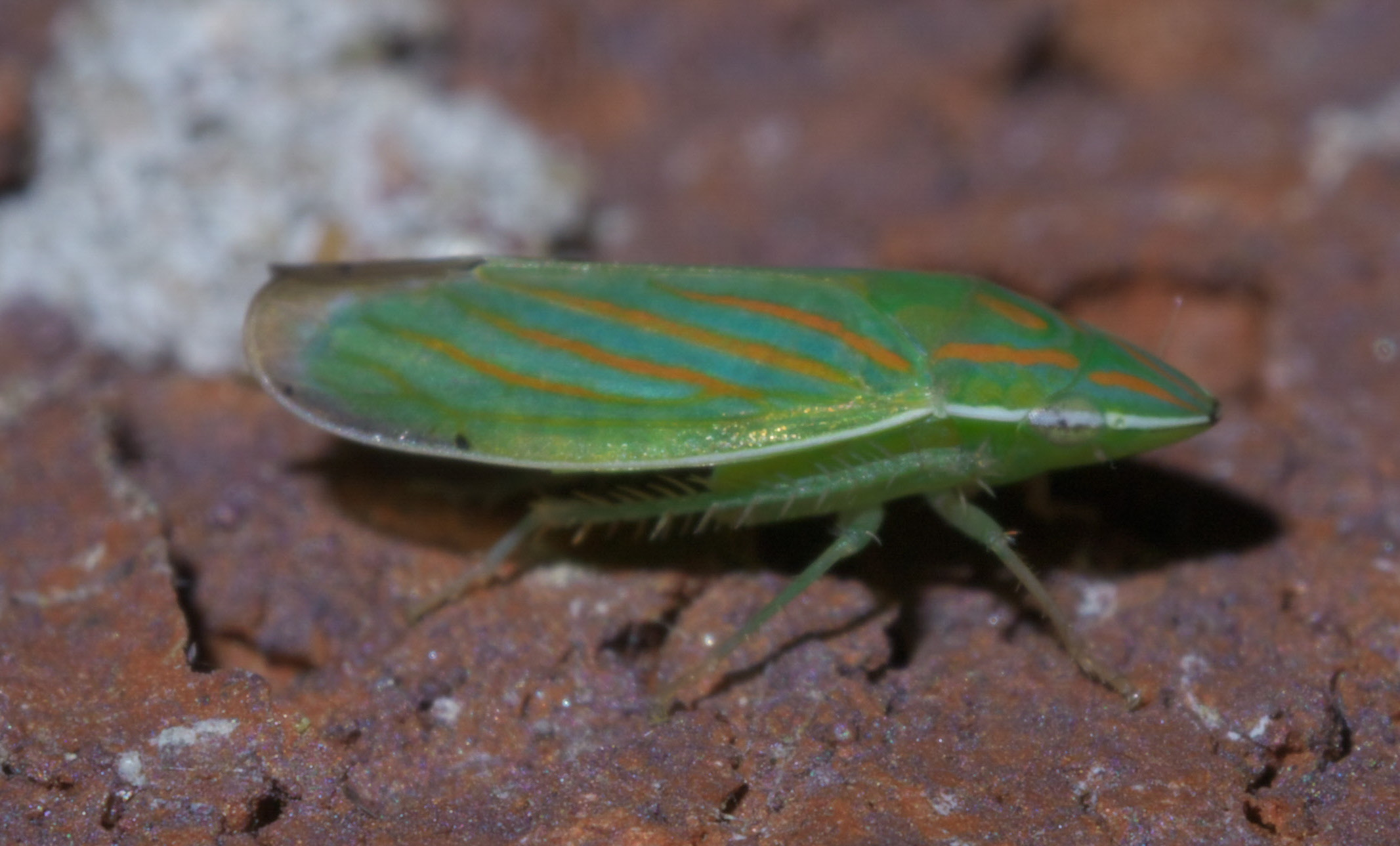
Spangbergiella viridis, Pryor, OK, USA
