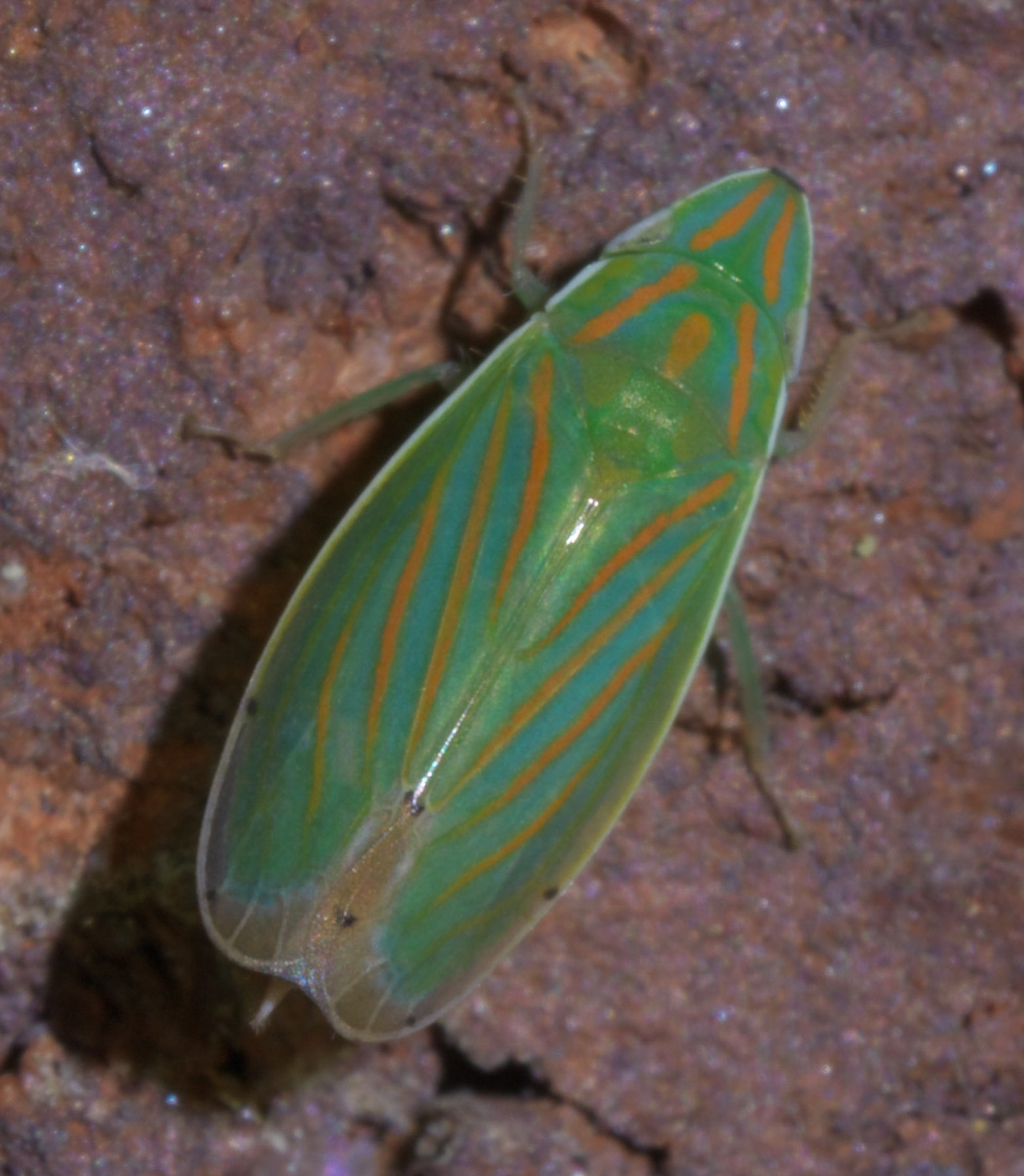
- Spangbergiella viridis

Scientific classification
- Domain: Eukaryota
- Kingdom: Animalia
- Phylum: Arthropoda
- Class: Insecta
- Order: Hemiptera
- Suborder: Auchenorrhyncha
- Family: Cicadellidae
- Tribe: Hecalini
- Genus: Spangbergiella

= Spangbergiella =

Genus of true bugs

Spangbergiella is a genus of leafhoppers in the family Cicadellidae. There are at least 4 described species in Spangbergiella.

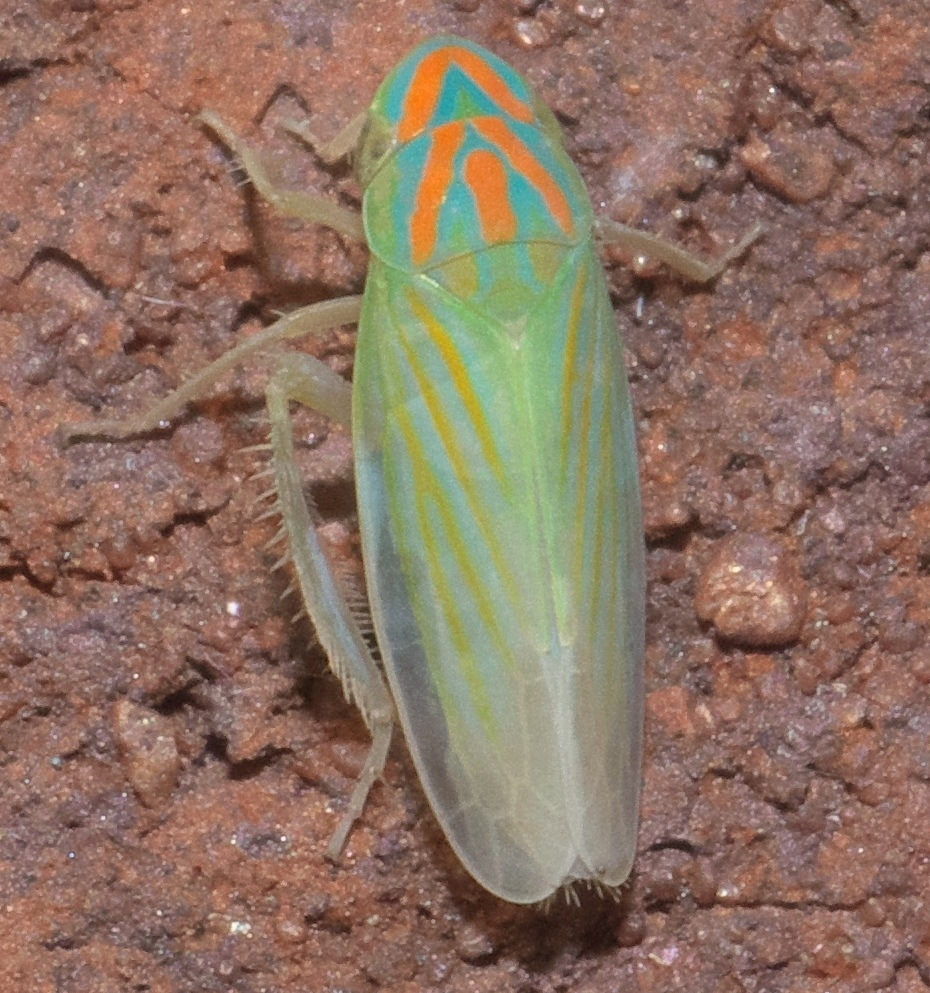
Spangbergiella vulnerata

== Species ==
- Spangbergiella mexicana Baker, 1897
- Spangbergiella quadripunctata Lawson, 1932
- Spangbergiella viridis (Provancher, 1872)
- Spangbergiella vulnerata (Uhler, 1877)
