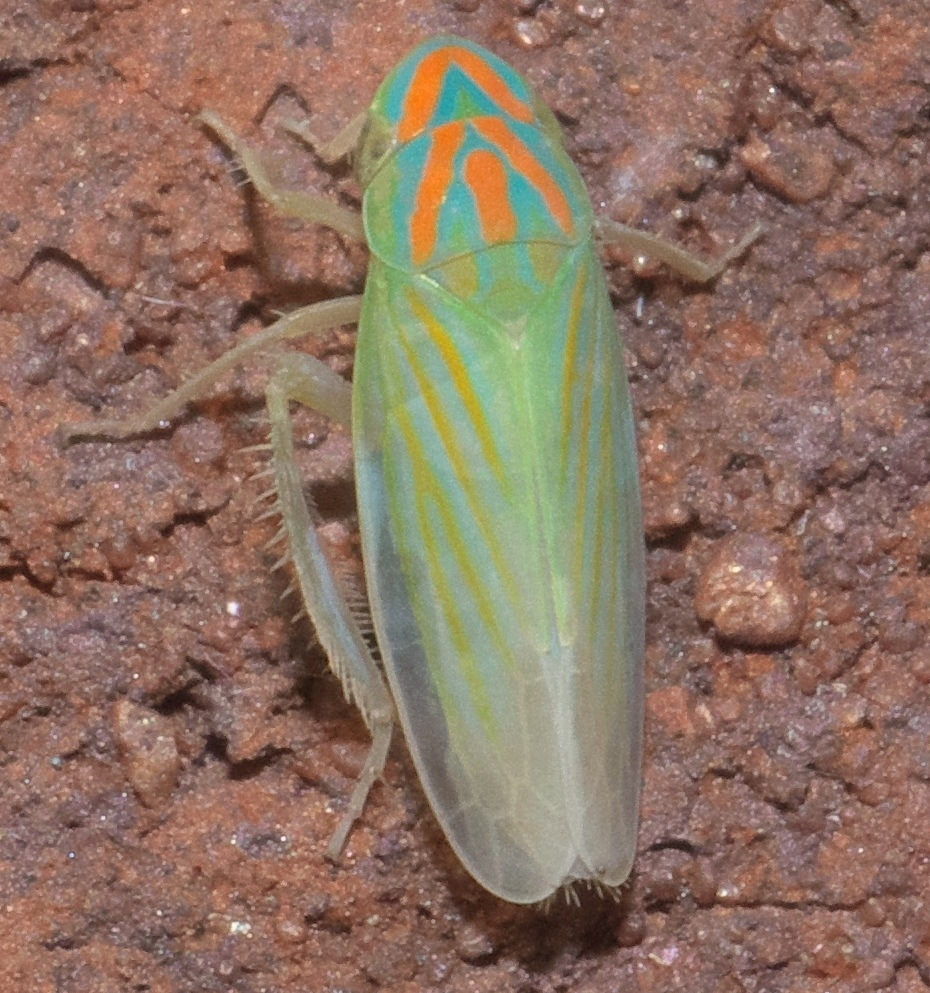
- Spangbergiella vulnerata

Scientific classification
- Kingdom: Animalia
- Phylum: Arthropoda
- Clade: Pancrustacea
- Class: Insecta
- Order: Hemiptera
- Suborder: Auchenorrhyncha
- Family: Cicadellidae
- Subfamily: Deltocephalinae
- Tribe: Hecalini; Distant, 1908

Genera
- 24, see text.

Synonyms
- Reuteriellini Evans, 1947

= Hecalini =

Tribe of true bugs

Hecalini is a tribe of leafhoppers in the family Cicadellidae. There are about 24 genera and over 180 described species divided into two subtribes in Hecalini.

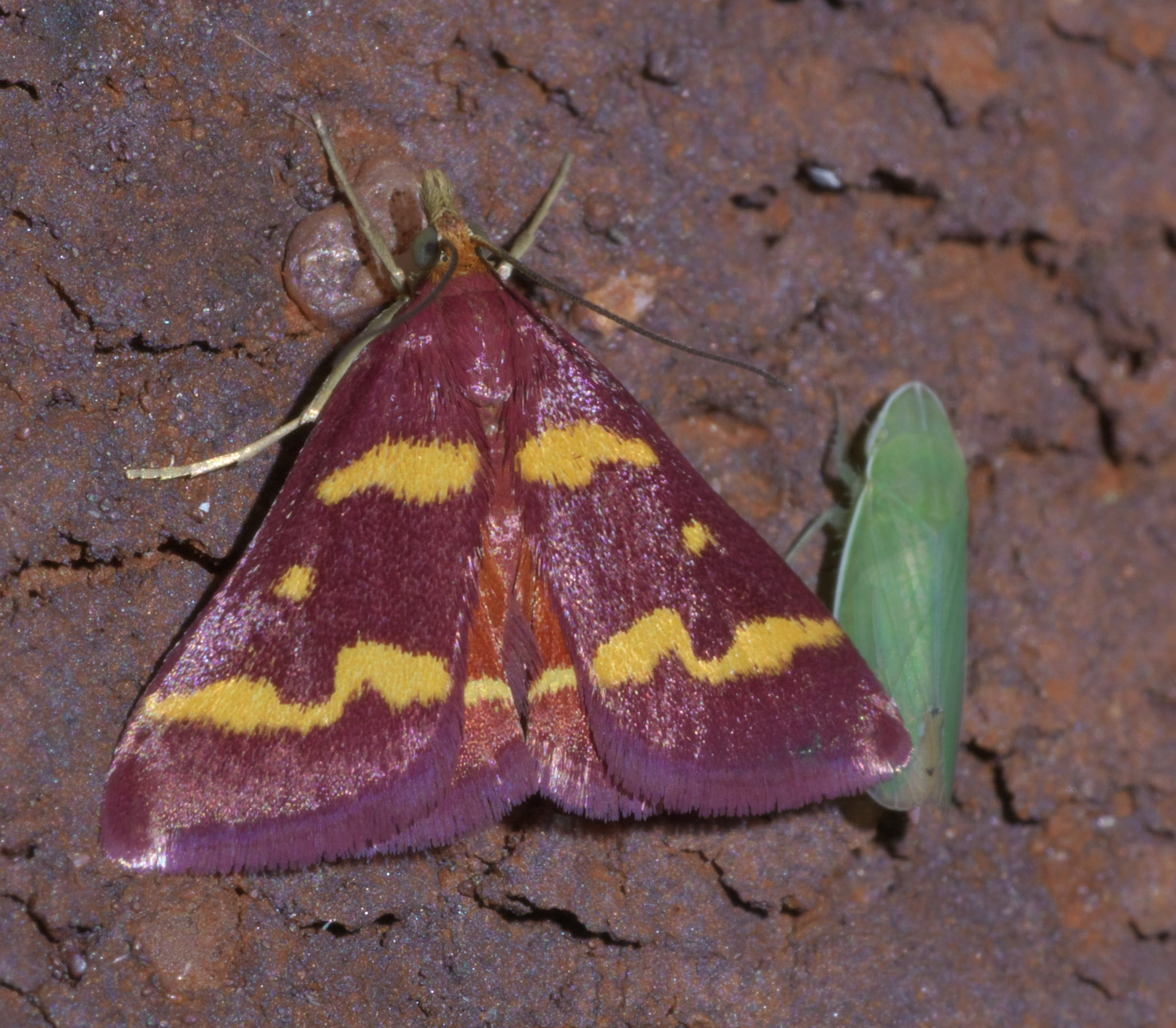
Memnonia flavida (right)

== Genera ==
Hecalini currently contains 24 described genera divided into two subtribes:

Subtribe Glossocratina Dmitriev, 2002

- Glossocratus Fieber, 1866

Subtribe Hecalina Distant, 1908

- Alospangbergia Evans, 1973
- Annidion Kirkaldy, 1905
- Attenuipyga Oman, 1949
- Bordesia de Bergevin, 1929
- Cephalius Fieber, 1875
- Clavena Melichar, 1902
- Dicyphonia Ball, 1900
- Epicephalius Matsumura, 1908
- Fangamanus He, Zhang, McKamey & Zahnsier, 2019
- Hecalocratus Evans, 1966
- Hecalus Stål, 1864
- Hecalusina He, Zhang & Webb, 2008
- Jiutepeca Linnavuori & DeLong, 1978
- Linnavuoriella Evans, 1966
- Lualabanus Linnavuori, 1975
- Memnonia Ball, 1900
- Neohecalus Linnavuori, 1975
- Neoslossonia Van Duzee, 1909
- Parabolocratalis Evans, 1955
- Psegmatus Fieber, 1875
- Reuteriella Signoret, 1879
- Spangbergiella Signoret, 1879
- Thomsoniella Signoret, 1880
