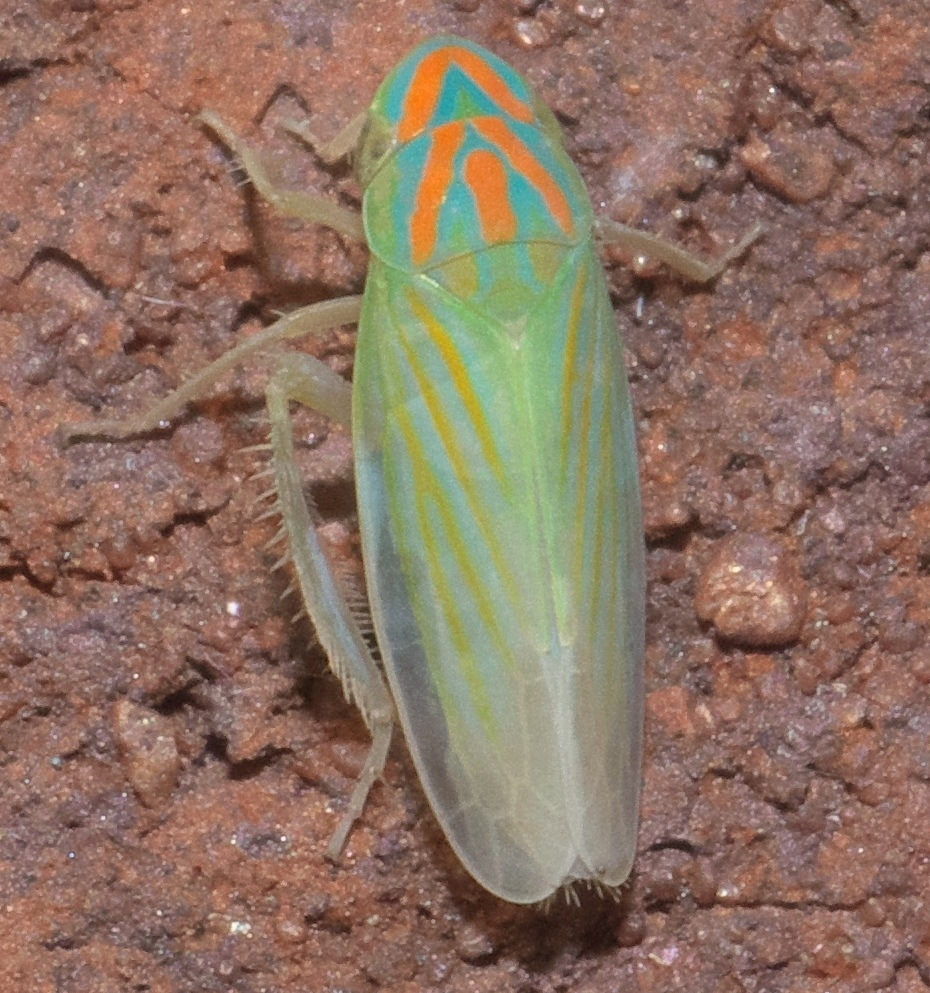

Scientific classification
- Domain: Eukaryota
- Kingdom: Animalia
- Phylum: Arthropoda
- Class: Insecta
- Order: Hemiptera
- Suborder: Auchenorrhyncha
- Family: Cicadellidae
- Genus: Spangbergiella
- Species: S. vulnerata

Binomial name
- Spangbergiella vulnerata (Uhler, 1877)

= Spangbergiella vulnerata =

Species of true bug

Spangbergiella vulnerata is a species of leafhopper in the family Cicadellidae.
