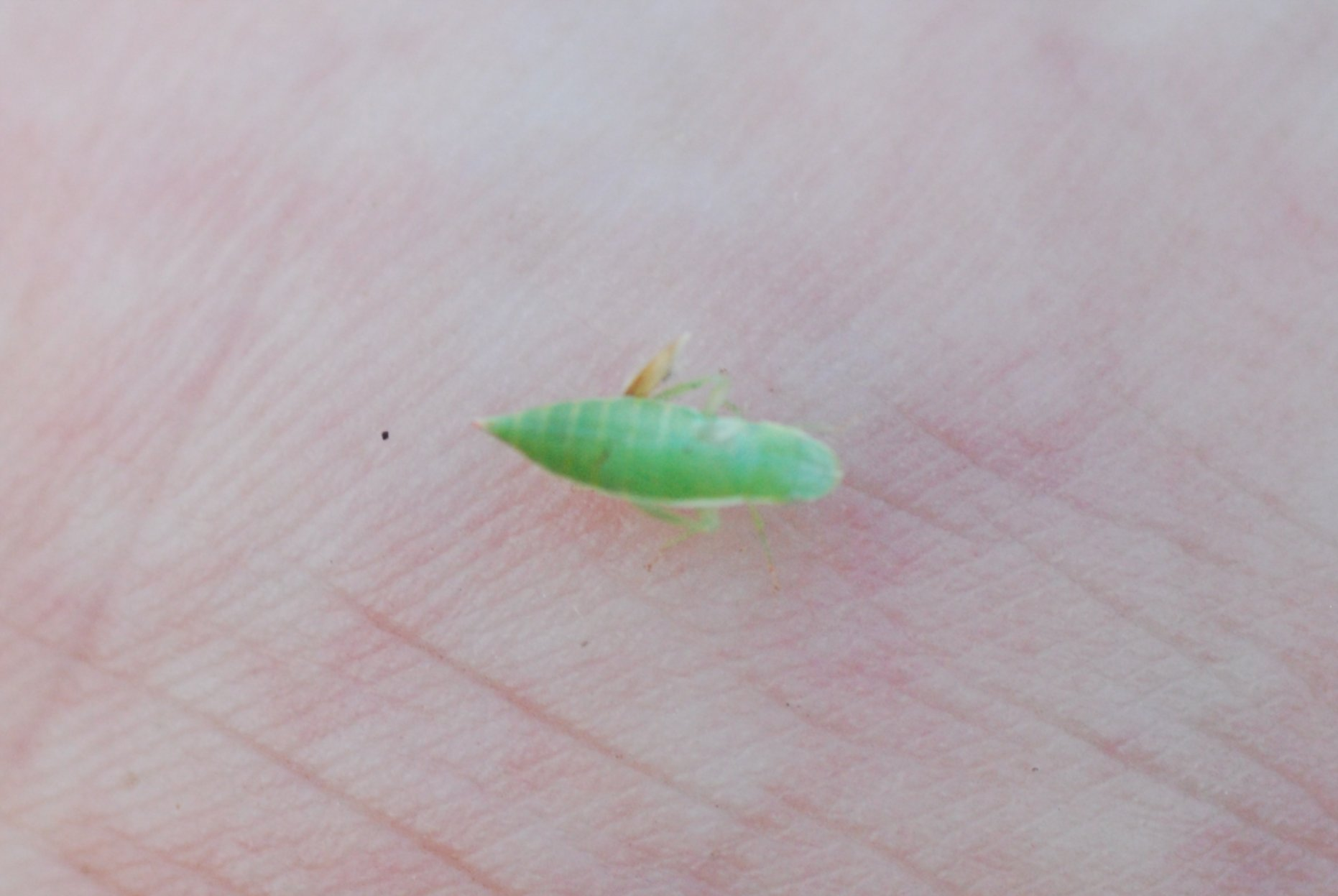
- Memnonia panzeri

Scientific classification
- Domain: Eukaryota
- Kingdom: Animalia
- Phylum: Arthropoda
- Class: Insecta
- Order: Hemiptera
- Suborder: Auchenorrhyncha
- Family: Cicadellidae
- Subfamily: Deltocephalinae
- Tribe: Hecalini
- Genus: Memnonia; Ball, 1900

= Memnonia (leafhopper) =

Genus of leafhoppers

Memnonia is a genus of leafhoppers belonging to the family Cicadellidae.

The species of this genus are found in Northern America.

Species:

- Memnonia albolinea Ball, 1937
- Memnonia anthalopus Hamilton, 2000
