= Gora =

Gora may refer to:

== Places ==
- Gora (region), in southern Kosovo and north-eastern Albania
- Gora (Kakanj), a village in Bosnia and Herzegovina
- Gora (Vogošća), a village in Bosnia and Herzegovina
- Gora, Croatia, a village
- Góra (disambiguation), various places in Poland
- Gora, Russia, several rural localities in Russia
- Gora, Cerknica, a settlement in the Municipality of Cerknica, Slovenia
- Gora, Krško, a settlement in the Municipality of Krško, Slovenia

== People ==
- Gora (surname)
- Gora (given name)
- Goparaju Ramachandra Rao ("Gora", 1902–1975), Indian social reformer and atheist activist
- Gora (racial epithet), a racial epithet for white people in India

== Arts and entertainment ==
- Gora (musical instrument), a Southern African instrument
- Gora (novel), a 1910 novel by Rabindranath Tagore
- Gora (TV series), an Indian Bengali-language streaming series
- G.O.R.A., a 2004 Turkish comedy film

== Other uses ==
- Gora Cemetery (disambiguation)
- Gora dialect, spoken by the Gorani people of Kosovo, North Macedonia and Albania
- Gōra Station, a railway station in Hakone, Japan
- El Gora Airport, Egypt
- Gora (moth), an 1862 designation for the moth genus Sagalassa

== See also ==
- Crna Gora, Montenegrin name of Montenegro
- Nova Gora (disambiguation)
- El Gorah, a locality in Egypt
- Ghora, a village in Pakistan
- Goura (disambiguation)
- Gaura (disambiguation)
- Gori (disambiguation)
