= Gaura (disambiguation) =

Gaura is a genus of flowering plants.

Gaura may also refer to:

- Gaura - a Hindu festival celebrated in Nepal
- Gaura, Jamo, a village in Uttar Pradesh, India
- Gaura, Kapurthala - village in Kapurthala district of Punjab State, India
- Gaura, Raebareli, a village in Uttar Pradesh, India
- Gaura, Unnao, a village in Uttar Pradesh, India
- Gaura - a chiefdom in Sierra Leone
- Gaura Caitanya Mahaprabhu - Gauranga Gaurahari Gauracandra Gaurasundara Gaura-Nitai / GAURA as referenced in the Sri Caitanya Upanishad glorifying Indian Vaishnava saint Sri Krsna Caitanya
- Guara, an alternate name for the Bengali Hindu mystic Caitanya Mahaprabhu

== See also ==
- Gaur (disambiguation)
- Gour (disambiguation)
- Gauda (disambiguation)
- Gowda (disambiguation)
- Goda (disambiguation)
- Gora (disambiguation)
