= José Antonio Sistiaga =

Spanish filmmaker (1932–2023)

José Antonio Sistiaga Mosso (4 May 1932 – 25 June 2023) was a Spanish Basque artist and experimental filmmaker best known for his feature-length hand-painted "direct" film, "Era erera baleibu izik subua aruaren" (1968–70). He lived and worked in the Basque Country, between Ciboure and San Sebastián.

== Early works ==
During the Spanish Civil War, as a son of a republican Basque, José Antonio Sistiaga had to escape from Bilbao with part of his family to Bordeaux after the bombing of Guernica in April 1937. In 1955, he settled in Paris where he met the Andalusian painter, Manuel Duque, and executed his first paintings in Paris, in the context of the Informal painting movement. His early works (black paintings) date from 1959: abstract, non-geometrical. They could be compared to Henri Michaux's or Jean Fautrier's works, despite the fact that Sistiaga never heard about these contemporary artists.

Back in Basque Country, Sistiaga met the sculptor Jorge Oteiza. In 1963, he created a workshop for free expression dedicated to children, influenced by alternative pedagogic method of Celestin Freynet; he collaborated in that direction with artist Esther Ferrer for a project based in Elorrio. During these years (60's) Sistiaga had a real interdisciplinary artistic strategy and interest between alternative teaching, performances, contemporary music and cinema. In 1966, he formed along with other Basque artists the influential avant-garde group Gaur. This collective gathered the following artists: Jorge Oteiza, Rafael Ruiz Balerdi, Eduardo Chillida, Remigio Mendiburu, Néstor Basterretxea, Amable Arias, José Luis Zumeta and José Antonio Sistiaga. Sistiaga focused his pictorical and graphic works on energy, movement, gesture: his works on canvas or paper seem to be seismographs of sensibilities and emotions.

== Alternative teachings, conferences and performances ==
Sistiaga discovered in Paris the artistic alternative workshop dedicated to children created by Arno Stern: L'Académie des jeudis. Stern searched to reveal the original creativity of the children, far from the artistic education. Sistiaga would create similar workshops when he was back in Spain (San Sebastián) with the help of artist Esther Ferrer: La Academia de los jueves, which was active from 1963 to 1968. In parallel, he was in touch with Celestin Freinet, who created the Methode Freinet of teaching, based on development of the child from his own capacities. Sistiaga organized exhibitions of children's creations in the Basque Country, sometimes with his own works.

== Experimental cinema ==
After seeing in Paris Norman McLaren's film, he decided to improve this medium to pass over his pictorial strategies. He exhibited his first film in 1968 at the Bilbao Short Film Festival. Titled 'Era erera baleibu izik subua aruaren' (a nonsense phrase coined by Sistiaga's friend Rafa Ruiz Balerdi), it won a prize for best experimental film. This 10-minute short, hand-painted in a fairly conventional cartoon style, was later renamed De la Luna a Euskadi ("From the Moon to the Basque Country").

Thanks to the help of collector and patron from Navarra, Juan Huarte, who created a film production company X-Films to produce films made by Basque artists from the Gaur Movement (Balerdi, Basterretxea, Sistiaga), the artist began painting his abstract magnum opus in 1968. It took 17 months of 10- to 12-hour days to complete. The silent, 75-minute film was first exhibited at Madrid in 1970. The technique is hand painted film. Sistiaga used the same vocabulary of his paintings (lines, points, color) onto the film celluloid and obtained random patterns of colored points that evoke the atomic matter or the "Primitive soup" of universe. Subsequent screenings took place in London, Paris, Barcelona and New York City.

Each of the approximately 108,000 frames in Era erera is completely unique, and appears onscreen for only 1/24th of a second. No optical printing techniques or special photographic effects were employed in its production. Era erera baleibu izik subua aruaren is the first feature-length example of "direct" cameraless filmmaking, a painstaking technique dating back to the early 1900s. Other well-known artists in the genre include Len Lye, Harry Smith, Norman McLaren (whose work Sistiaga cites as a direct influence) and Stan Brakhage.

In 1972, José Antonio Sistiaga participated in the International Art Event Encuentros de Pamplona with painting and his films. Juan Huarte (patron of the event) commissioned him to shoot a film on the event where participated American composer John Cage, Steve Reich and European ones Luc Ferrari and José Luis Isasa. During this period, Sistiaga painted large paintings with curves, lines on white canvas.

== Later hand-painted films and recent paintings ==
In 1988–1989, Sistiaga painted a new direct film Impresiones en la alta atmósfera ("Impressions from the Upper Atmosphere") in 70mm 15-perf horizontal format, intended for exhibition in giant-screen IMAX and Omnimax theaters.

From the middle of the 1990s, the artist got a generous space in Antiguo district (in San Sebastián), allowing the artist to produce his huger canvas: Cosmos Oceano, The Four Seasons, Maurice Ravel's tribute are some of them.

Two additional 35mm films using a different technique, filming hand painting transparents, Paisaje inquietante Nocturno ("Disturbing Nocturnal Landscape") and En un jardin imaginado ("In an Imaginary Garden"), were completed in 1991.

After that, Sistiaga began working on a new film onto 70 mm celluloid with IMAX format: Han. Sobre el sol. Still unfinished (only 2 minutes have been released), this film explores the cosmic iconography of stars and galaxies; with this aim, the artist used two animation techniques: "direct film" (hand painted film) and animation frame after frame for fixing in the frame a form.

Painterly and cinematic processes nourish each other in Sistiaga's works. The artist had been working since 2011 on a new typology of paintings on board, following Jackson Pollock's dripping technique; this series is composed of two sorts of works: first, those which get the impact of the gesture on the board surface and, second, those which collect splatters or splashes from a distance. This strategy which aims at collecting on the surface traces of vital energy, has links with alchemical processes or for example interest of artists for magnetism and all other emanations of invisible.

His films are part of permanent collections of eminent museums in the world: Centre Pompidou, Musée national d'art moderne (Paris) and Museo de arte Reina Sofia in Madrid. Sistiaga's paintings are displayed at the Museo de bellas artes in Bilbao, at the Museo San Telmo in San Sebastián and at the Museo nacional Centro de arte Reina Sofia in Madrid.

== Death ==
Sistiaga died on 25 June 2023, at the age of 91.

== Filmography ==
- Era erera baleibu izik subua aruaren (retitled De la Luna a Euskadi) (1968) (35mm, silent, 8 minutes)
- Era erera baleibu izik subua aruaren (1968–70) (35mm, silent, 75 minutes)
- Ana (1970) (16mm, sound, 7 minutes)
- Laztanak (1970) (16mm, 85 minutes)
- Encuentros 1972, Pamplona (1972) (16mm, silent)
- Impresiones en la alta atmósfera (1988–89) (70mm 15-perf, sound, 7 minutes)
- Paisaje inquietante Nocturno (1991) (35mm, sound, 14 minutes)
- En un jardin imaginado (1991) (35mm, sound, 14 minutes)
- Han (sobre el sol) (1992; in progress) (70mm 15-perf, sound, actually 2 minutes)

== Films on José Antonio Sistiaga ==
- Sistiaga. A Basque Story. directed and produced by Manuel Sorto. 2014. 100 min.

== Bibliography ==
- Sistiaga : pintura, dibujos eroticos, films : 1958-1996. Bilbao: Rekalde Eraskustaretoa, DL. 1996.
- ... era erera baleibu izik subua aruaren ... filma (sistiaga 1968/70). San Sebastián: Edizioarena KGNZ. 2007. ISBN 978-84-611-7466-9. OCLC 166351665.
- Bego Vicario, Jesus Maria Mateos (2007). Sistiaga, el trazo vibrante. Animadrid.
- Sistiaga : suite érotique (exhibition cat). San Sebastián: Deputation Foral de Gipuzkoa. 2007.
- José Antonio Sistiaga Lorategi irudikatu bateko islak. (Reflections in an imaginary garden). San Sebastián: Koldo Mitxelena Kulturunea. 2011. ISBN 978-84-7907-664-1.
- José Antonio Sistiaga. De la pintura gestual al arte del movimiento. Alzuza (Pamplona): Fundacion Museo Jorge Oteiza. Pamplona, Navarra. 2015. ISBN 978-84-943774-0-2.
- Entretien JA Sistiaga/JM Bouhours. Paris: Revue Gruppen. April 2017. ISBN 978-2-919103-16-4.
- Carlos Tejeda (2018). "Pintar sobre el celuloide: José Antonio Sistiaga y Rafael Ruiz Balerdi". El grupo Gaur. 50 años. Gabriel Insausti (ed). Editorial Comares. ISBN 978-84-9045-646-0.

Ciboure, repaire d'artistes; Ziburu, artisten ohanttze bat, Jean Paul Goikoetxea, 1995, ed. Couleurs du sud (épuisé); Prix Maurice Ravel et Médaille de la ville de Ciboure - 2e édition, 2008, ed. Sarea.
