= Gaur (surname) =

Gaur is a surname. Notable people with the surname include:

== Arts ==
- Arvind Gaur — Indian theatre director and social activist
- Chanda Singh Gaur — Indian politician (born 1960)
- Chandrakant Gaur — Indian film director (1929–2012)
- Harshita Gaur — Indian actress (born 1990)
- Meenu Gaur — British-Indian director and screenwriter
- Natharam Sharma Gaur — writer and artist (1874 – 1943)
- Saloni Gaur — Indian comedian and impressionist (born 1999)
- Shailendra Gaur — Indian actor
- Vijay Gaur — artist and sculptor

== Military ==
- Brahmjit Gaur — Brahmin general of the C16th
- Harsh Uday Singh Gaur — Indian military officer (1953 — 1994)

== Politics and law ==
- Anshuman Gaur — Indian Foreign Service officer (born 1974)
- Bhavna Gaur — Indian politician (born 1970)
- Babulal Gaur — Indian politician (1929 – 2019)
- Bhuvneshwar Gaur — Indian politician (born 1974)
- Krishna Gaur — Indian politician (born 1967 or 1968)
- Laxman Singh Gaur — Indian politician (1958 — 2008)
- Mahendra Gaur — Indian lawyer (born 1956)
- Malini Gaur — Indian politician
- Naresh Gaur — Indian politician and advocate (born 1952)
- Narendra Kumar Singh Gaur — Indian politician (born 1943)
- Nirupama Gaur — Indian politician and former First Lady minister of Uttarakhand
- Raj Krishan Gaur — Indian politician (1931 — 2011)
- Raj Kumar Gaur — Indian independent politician (born 1948)
- Ramdular Gaur — Indian politician (born 1973)

== Science ==
- Deepak Gaur — Indian molecular biologist and professor (1972–2021)
- Vinod Kumar Gaur — Indian seismologist (born 1936)

== Sport ==
- Indra Angad-Gaur — retired Dutch female foil fencer (born 1974)
- Mahika Gaur — English cricketer (born 2006)
- Richa Gaur — Indian martial arts competitor (born 1993)

== Others ==
- Jaiprakash Gaur — Indian entrepreneur (born c.1930)
