= Gaur (disambiguation) =

The gaur is a bovine animal.

Gaur may also refer to:

== Places ==
- Gaur, Nepal, a town in the Rautahat district of Nepal
- Gauḍa (city), also called Gaur, a historic city of Bengal, India
- River Gaur in Perthshire, Scotland

== Other uses ==
- Gaur (artistic group), a Basque artistic group established in 1966
- Gaur, an early transcription for Jushur, a Sumerian king
- Gaur (clan) a Rajput clan
- Gaur Brahmins, a community of Brahmins in India

== See also ==
- Gaur (surname)
- Gor (disambiguation)
- Gour (disambiguation)
- Gauda (disambiguation)
- Gowda (disambiguation)
- Goda (disambiguation)
- Gora (disambiguation)
- Gauri (disambiguation)
- Giaour, a historical slur for non-Muslims
  - Gäwürgala, fortress in Merv, Turkmenistan
  - Gyaur Kala, fortress in Xojeli, Uzbekistan
  - Gyaur Kala of Sultan Uvays, fortress in Amudarya District, Uzbekistan
- Guar, a green vegetable
- Guar gum
