= Gowda =

Gowda may refer to:

- Gowda (surname), a surname native to Karnataka, India
  - H. D. Deve Gowda, prime minister of India from 1996 to 1997
- Vokkaliga, also known as Gowda, farming community in Karnataka, India
  - Tulu Gowda, a subsect of Vokkaliga from Karnataka, India
- Arebhase Gowda a sub caste of Vokkkaliga from Karnataka, India

== See also ==
- Gouda (disambiguation)
- Gauda (disambiguation)
- Gaur (disambiguation)
- Gaura (disambiguation)
- Gour (disambiguation)
- Goda (disambiguation)
