= Oteiza (disambiguation) =

Oteiza may refer to:

Places:

- Oteiza, a village in Navarre, Spain

People:

- Antonio Oteiza (1926–2025), Spanish sculptor and Capuchin brother; brother of Jorge
- Jorge Oteiza (1908–2003), Basque Spanish sculptor, painter, designer and writer

Botanics:

- Oteiza (plant), a genus of plants
