= Gour =

Gour may refer to:

- Gour Brahmins, an Indian caste of Brahmins or landlords
- Gour, an Indian caste of Muslims
- Hari Singh Gour (1870–1949), Indian lawyer, educator, and writer
- Joseph-Omer Gour (1893–1959), Canadian politician
- Rimstone, a cave formation
- Mushroom rock, a rock formation
- Gour Kingdom, an ancient kingdom based in Sylhet, Bangladesh
  - Gour, capital of Gour Kingdom situated in Malda district, West Bengal, India
  - Gour Govinda (r. 1260–1303), the final ruler of Gauda Kingdom

== See also ==
- Gauda (disambiguation)
- Gaur (disambiguation)
- Gaura (disambiguation)
- Gowda (disambiguation)
- Goda (disambiguation)
- Gora (disambiguation)
- Ghor Province, one of the thirty-four provinces of Afghanistan
