= Dasarahalli inscriptions and hero stones =

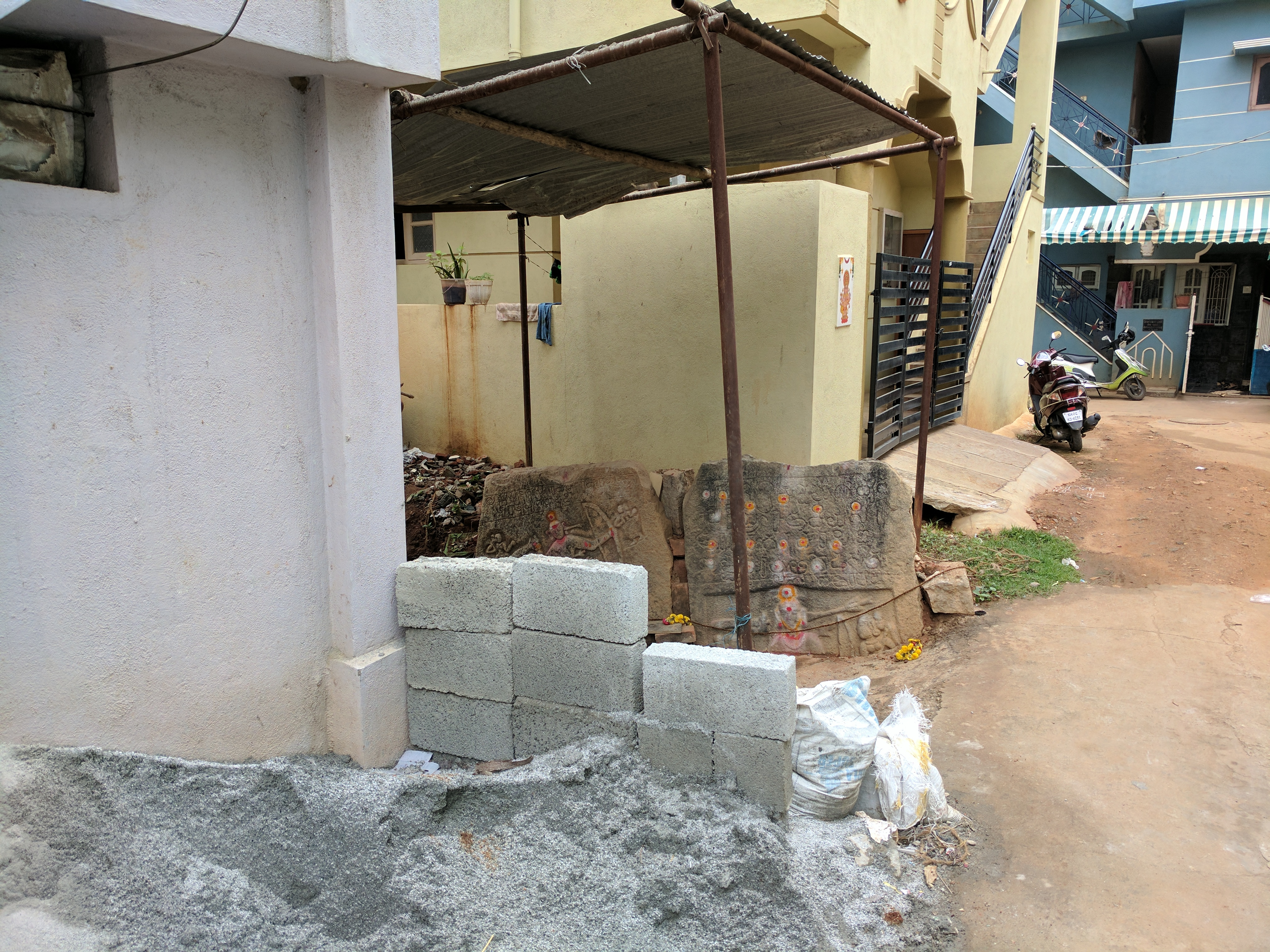
T. Dasarahalli hero stones with inscription.

T. Dasarahalli is a locality in North Bengaluru, which is home to four Kannada inscriptions dated between the 8th and 10th centuries CE. All the inscriptions refer to the deaths of heroes who fought in fierce battles. They record the historical name of T. Dasarahalli as Injatur and mention several administrative divisions, including Palikkarinad, Kukkalanad and Karikanad.

Of the four inscriptions, two — the Kosigaramalta Guramareya's turugol hero stone — are physically extant, while the physical status of the remaining two — the Kukkara inscription and the Dharmagudu inscription — is unknown. These inscriptions have been published in Epigraphia Carnatica and the Journal of the Mythic Society.

== Kosigaramalta Guramareya's Turugol hero stone inscription ==
T. Dasarahalli 800 CE Kosigaramalta Guramareya's Turugol hero stone with inscription
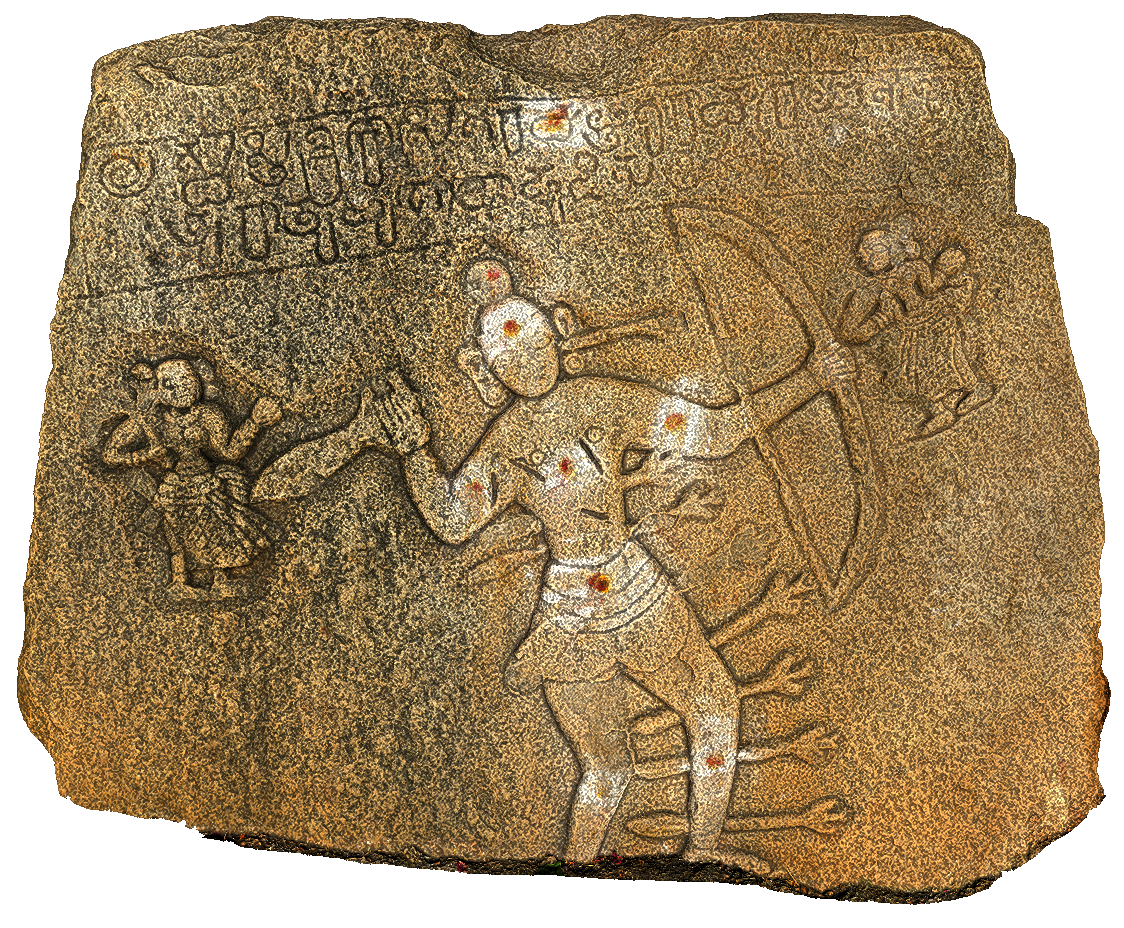
- Digital image of the T. Dasarahalli 800 CE Kosigaramalta Guramareya's Turugol hero stone with inscription. Picture Courtesy: Wikimedia Commons
- Material: Stone
- Height: 106 cm (42 in)
- Width: 121 cm (48 in)
- Writing: Kannada script of that time
- Created: 800 (1226 years ago)
- Discovered: 1905
- Discovered by: B L Rice and team of the Mysore Archaeological Department
- Present location: 13.042611°N 77.509639°E
- https://mythicsociety.github.io/AksharaBhandara/#/learn/Shasanagalu?id=115144

The inscription, dated paleographically to around 800 CE, commemorates the heroic death of Kosigaramalta Guramareya, who was killed while defending against a cattle raid (turugol) in the region of Injatur. The term turugol refers to the act of cattle raiding, in which cattle—considered a significant form of wealth in ancient times—were stolen. Those who died defending cattle from such raids were honoured with memorial stones known as hero stones (vīragallu). The presence of two such hero stones in this locality suggests that the area may have been particularly prone to such raids.

The name "Injatur" is mentioned in this and two adjacent inscriptions. Based on this evidence, it can be inferred that the present-day Dasarahalli area was formerly known as Injatur. The inscription was first published in the Journal of the Mythic Society.

=== Physical characteristics ===
The stone measures 106 cm in height and 121 cm in width. The Kannada characters are 5 cm tall, 2 cm wide, and 0.22 cm deep, indicating a very shallow incision. The sculptural depiction shows a battle scene in which the hero wields a bow and dagger while being struck by arrows. On either side, apsaras are shown holding flywhisks (chamara). Adjacent to the final character of the inscription, a small four-petalled flower is delicately engraved.

=== Transliteration of the inscription ===
The transliteration of the text was published in the Journal of the Mythic Society.

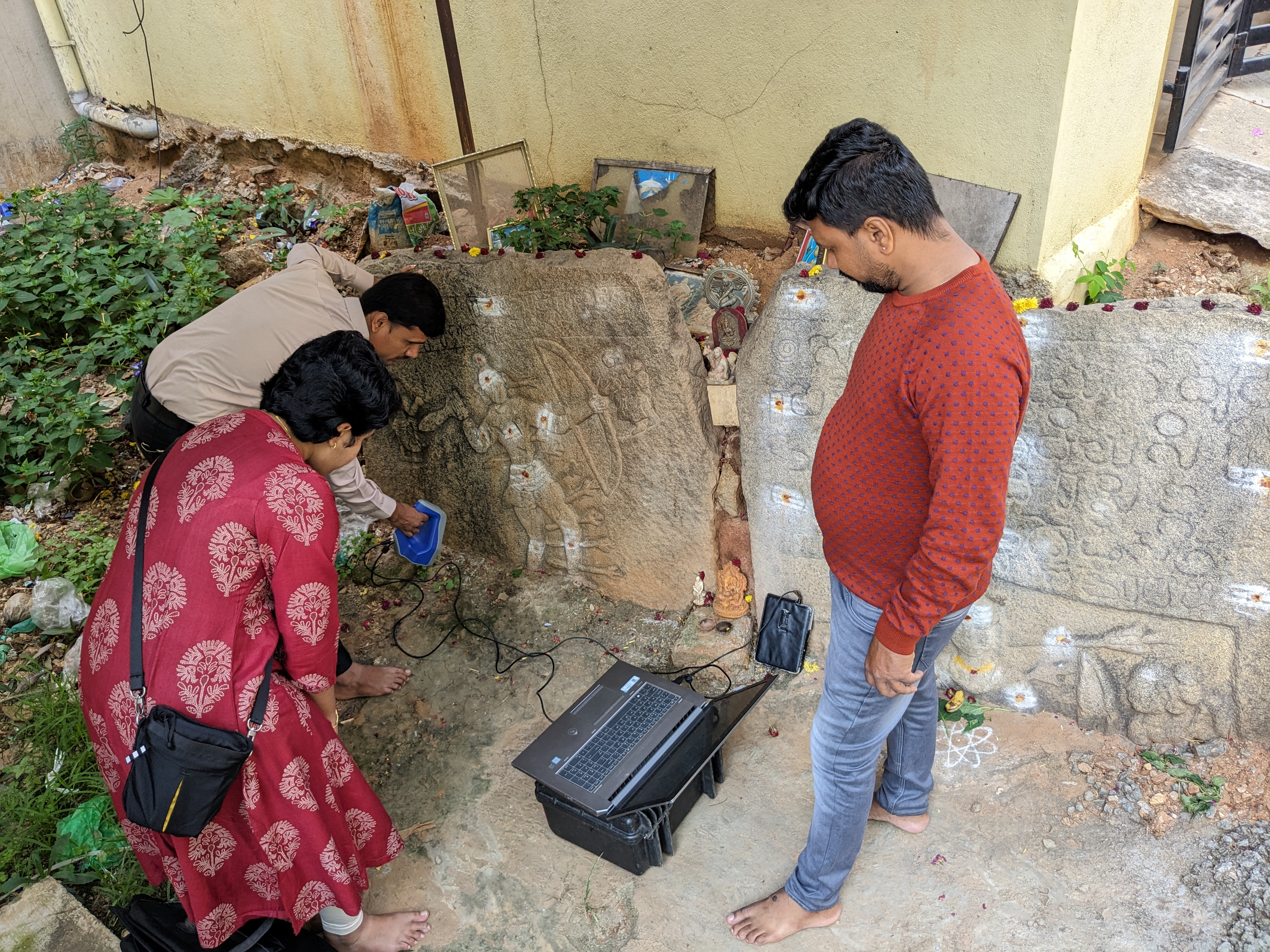
3D scanning of the T. Dasarahalli 800CE Kosigaramalta Guramareya's Turugol hero stone inscription.

A 3D scan of the hero stone inscription has been created, along with digital images of each character, high-resolution photographs of the inscription, and a summary. This material is available through the Akshara Bhandara software.

Line Number	Kannada	IAST
1	಄ ಸ್ವಸ್ತಿ ಶ್ರೀ ಕೋಸಿಗರಮೞ್ತ ಗುರಾಮರೆಯನಿಞ್ಜ	಄ svasti śrī kosigaramaḻta gurāmarĕyaniñja
2	ತೂರಾ ತುಱುಗೊಳೊಳ್ಕದಿ ಸತ್ತನ್	tūrā tuṟugŏlŏ̤lka̤ di sattan

== Marasinga Turugol hero stone with inscription ==
The T. Dasarahalli 800 CE Marasinga Turugol hero stone with inscription
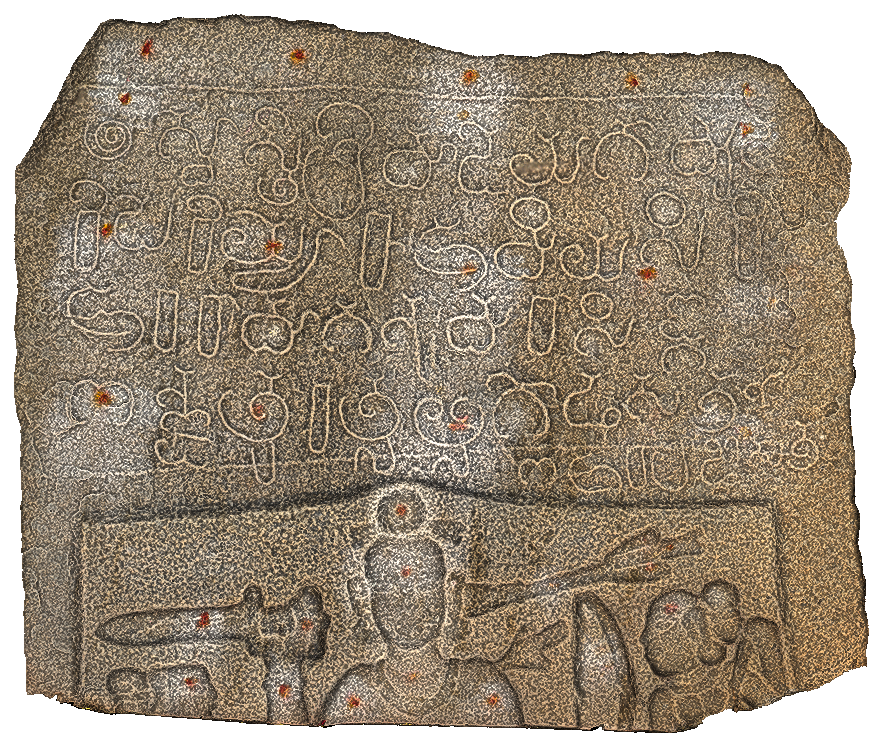
- Digital image of The T. Dasarahalli 800 CE Turugol hero stone obtained by 3D digital scanning of the hero stone. Picture Courtesy: Wikimedia Commons
- Material: Stone
- Height: 110 cm (43 in)
- Width: 129 cm (51 in)
- Writing: Kannada script of that time
- Created: 900 (1126 years ago)
- Discovered: 1905
- Discovered by: B L Rice and team of the Mysore Archaeological Department
- Present location: 13.042611°N 77.509639°E
- Language: Kannada language of that time
- https://mythicsociety.github.io/AksharaBhandara/#/learn/Shasanagalu?id=115143

This hero stone, bearing a Kannada inscription, commemorates Marasinga, who died while defending Injatur from a turugol (cattle raid). The term turugol refers to the act of cattle raiding, in which cattle—considered an important form of wealth in ancient times—were stolen. Those who perished in such defence were honoured through the erection of hero stones (vīragallu).

The inscription records that it was created during the reign of mādĕyagāmuṃḍa. The suffix gāmuṃḍa is an Old Kannada term referring to a village headman, related to terms such as gāvunda, gāvundar, and gāmundar, corresponding to the present-day Kannada term gowda. The hero stone is currently located in T. Dasarahalli.

=== Transliteration of the inscription ===
The transliteration of the text was first published in Epigraphia Carnatica, with a subsequent rereading appearing in the Journal of the Mythic Society.

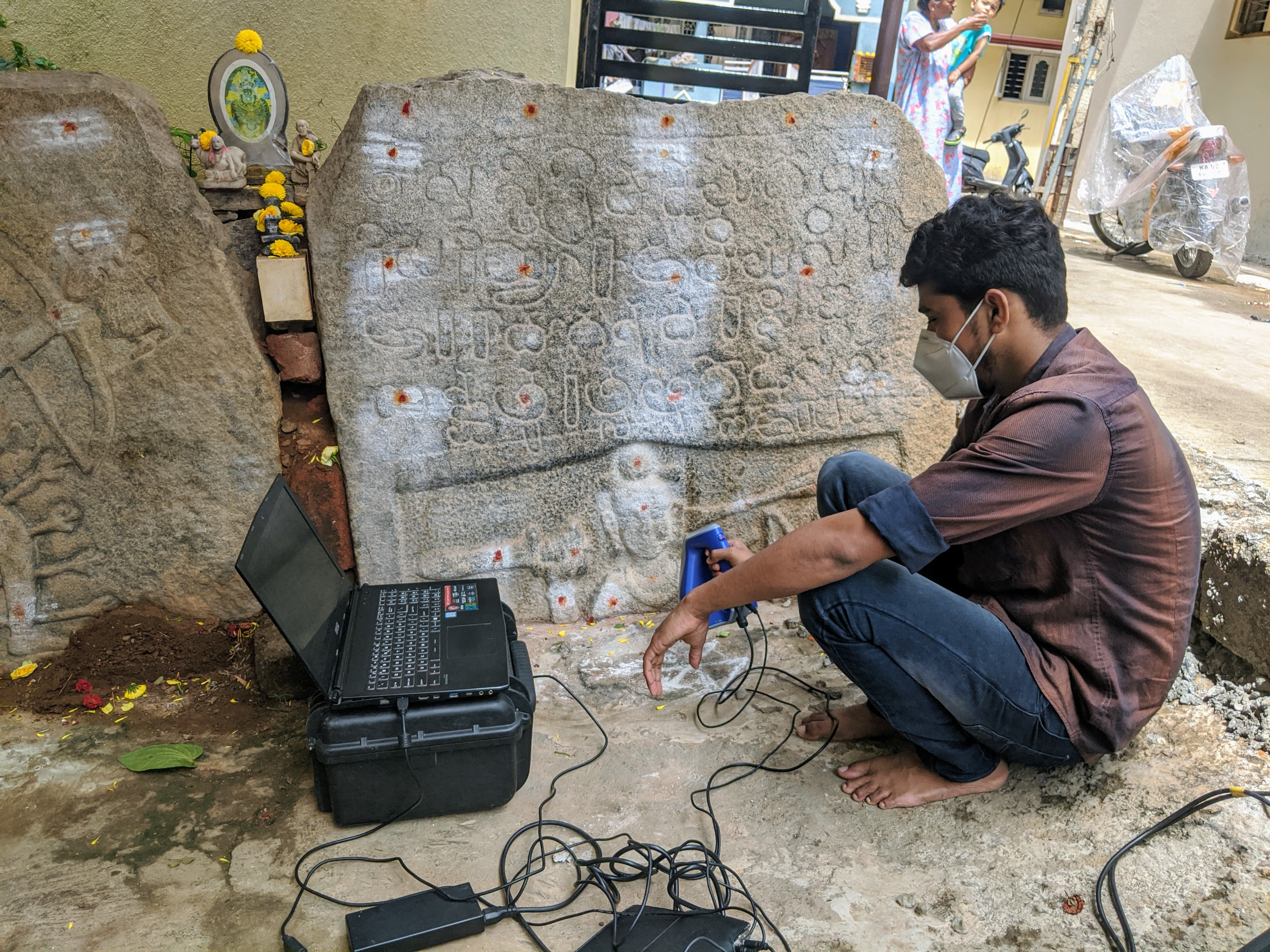
3D scanning of the T. Dasarahalli 800 CE Turugol hero stone with inscription.

A 3D scan of the hero stone has been created, along with high-resolution images of each character, photographs of the inscription, a summary, and other related information. These materials are available through the Akshara Bhandara software.

Line Number	Kannada	IAST
1	಄ ಸ್ವೊಸ್ತಿಶ್ರೀ ಮಾದೆಯಗಾಮುಂಡ	಄ svŏstiśrī mādĕyagāmuṃḍa
2	ರೀ ಪೆರಿಯೂರು ಊಮಿಯ ಸಿರಿ	rī pĕriyūru ūmiya siri
3	ಊರ ರಾಮಾಗನು ಮಾರಸಿಙ್ಗ	ūra rāmāganu mārasiṅga
4	ಇನ್ಜತುರ ತೂಱೂಗೊಳೆ ಸತನ್	injatura tūṟūgŏlĕ satan
5	ಇ ಊರ ಆಳ್ವೊ ಸತಂ	i ūra ālvŏ̤ satam

=== Translation ===
The translation, as published in Volume 9 of Epigraphia Carnatica, reads:

"Be it well, when Madiyamunda was ruling this Periyur, Siriyura's son Marasinga died fighting in the turugol of Injatur."

== 8th century CE Kukkara inscription ==
This Kannada inscription, dated to the 8th century CE, was issued during the reign of the Western Ganga king Sripurusha. It commemorates the heroic death of Kukkara, who ruled Bidirkal and drove out the forces of Palikkarinad. The place name Bidirkal corresponds to the present-day sub-locality of Chikkabidirakallu in the vicinity of T. Dasarahalli, while the location of Palikkarinad cannot be identified with certainty.

The inscription also records the name of the scribe as Naga. It was documented in Epigraphia Carnatica, Volume 9. The present physical status of the inscription is unknown.

=== Transliteration of the inscription ===
The transliteration of the text was published in Epigraphia Carnatica, and a rereading was later published in the Journal of the Mythic Society.

Line Number	Kannada	modern English
1	ಸ್ವಸ್ತಿಶ್ರಿಮತ್‍ ಶ್ರಿಪುರುಷ ಮಹಾರಾಜಂ ಪೃಥುವೀ ರಾ	svastiśrī śrīpurusha maharājam pruthuvi rā
2	ಜ್ಯಂಗೆಯ್ಯೆ ವೊಲೆತ್ತಾಳ್ವೊರೆನ್ನ ಕರಿಕನಾಡ	jyamgeyye volettalvorenna karikanāda
3	ಬಿದಿರ್ಕಲ್ಲಾಳ್ದ ಕುಕ್ಕರಪಾೞಿಕ್ಕಾಱಿನಾಡಿಯರ್ ತುರಿದು	bidirkallalda kukkarapaalkkarinaadiyar turidu
4	ಪಡೆಯುಳವರಷ್ಟೆ ಬಲಮನ್ನ ಎಱಿದುಬಿಱ್ದು . .	padeyulavarashte balamanna eridubirdu. .
5	ಶ್ರೀಅಮ್ಬಿ ಆಚಾರಿಯರ ಮಗ ನ್ನಾಗನ್‍ ಮಡಿದ	śrīambi āchāriyara maga naga mādida

=== Translation ===
The translation, as published in Volume 9 of Epigraphia Carnatica, reads:

"Be it well. When Sripurusha-maharaja was ruling the kingdom of the earth called Polettalvor, Kukkara, who was ruling Bidirkkal in Karika-nad, drove out the Palikkari-nad people, and smiting the whole force of foot-soldiers, fell. Ambi-achari's son Naga made this."

== 10th century CE Dharmagudu inscription ==
This Kannada inscription, dated to the 10th century CE, is fragmentary and incomplete. From the surviving text, it can be inferred that it commemorates a hero who died in battle. The present physical status of the inscription is unknown.

=== Transliteration of the inscription ===
The transliteration of the text was published in Epigraphia Carnatica.

Line Number	Kannada	modern English
1	ಸ್ವಸ್ತಿಶ್ರಿ ಇನ್ದರನಾಳಾಧರ್ಮಗುಡು . .	svastiśrī indaranālādharmagudu. .
2	ನುಮಿಱಿದು ಸ್ವರ್ಗ್ಗಸ್ತರಾದರ್ ಇದ . .	numiridu svargastarādar ida. .
3	. . . . . . ದಳ್ದಗಿಯರಮ್ಮ . . .	. . . . . . . daldagiyaramma
4	ಇದಮ್ಮಸಿದಾಪರಿಯ . . . .	idammasidāpariya. . . . .
5	. . . . . . .	. . . . . . .

=== Translation ===
The translation, as published in Epigraphia Carnatica, reads:

"Be it well. When Indara was ruling—Dharmagudu, piercing ... went to svargga. A grant was made for him. [Includes imprecation]."
