= Antonio Oteiza =

Spanish sculptor and Capuchin friar (1926–2025)

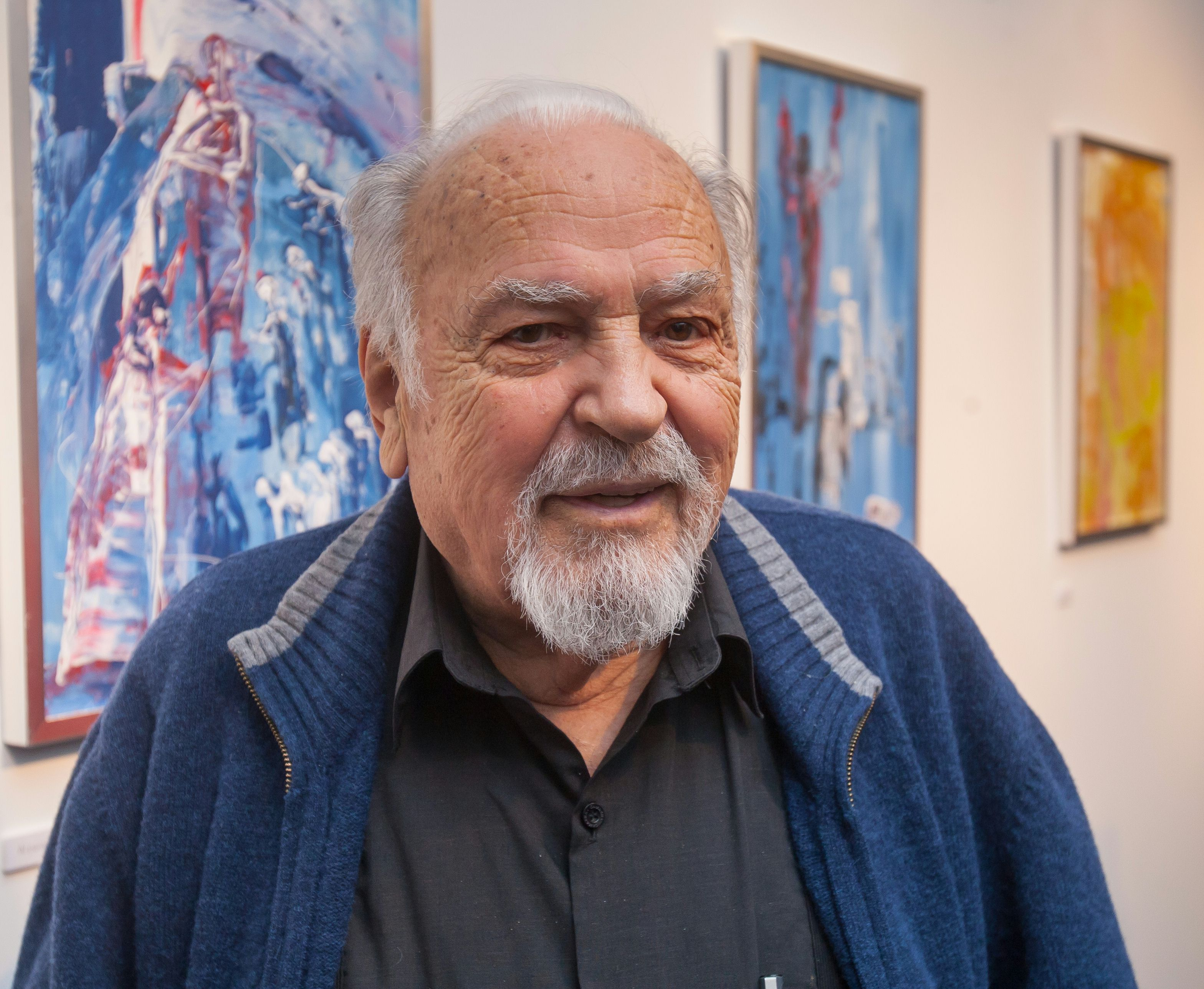
- Oteiza in an exhibition of his paintings, 2019
- Born: 26 June 1926; San Sebastián, Gipuzkoa, Spain
- Died: 4 August 2025 (aged 99); Madrid, Spain
- Occupations: Sculptor; Painter; Writer; Missionary
- Website: antonioteiza.org/es/biografia/

Antonio Oteiza Enbil (26 June 1926 – 4 August 2025) was a Spanish sculptor and painter, and a Capuchin brother. He was first a missionary in Latin America, and then focused on creating religious art from 1961 which he felt had more impact than sermons.

== Biography ==
Oteiza was born to a Basque family in San Sebastián on 26 June 1926. He had a brother, Jorge, who was 18 years his senior and would become a famous sculptor. His father and Jorge left for Argentina in 1928 when Antonio was aged two. Antonio remained with his mother and grew up with four younger siblings. In 1945, he became a Capuchin novice in Bilbao, where he studied philosophy from 1946 to 1948 and theology until 1952. He was ordained as a Catholic priest in Madrid in 1953. He was a missionary for several years from the 1950s, first in Bayamo, Cuba, and then in Colombia, Venezuela, Brazil and the Andes of Peru. When he travelled to Venezuela at age 30, he wanted to commemorate 300 years of Capuchines working there by a sculpture, but found no artist, so finally created a clay sculpture himself.

Oteiza requested permission from his superiors to focus on art in 1961. Upon returning to Spain in the early 1960s, he settled in Madrid and began developing his artistic career. He learned from the sculptor Víctor de los Ríos and the painter Amadeo Roca from San Fernando, and took part in a summer course at the Perugia International Academy of Fine Arts. He set up his workshop at the Capuchin convent in Cuatro Caminos in Madrid. He created sculptures together with his brother Jorge for one project, the Sanctuary of Arantzazu in 1969, in a team with architect Francisco Javier Sáenz de Oiza, painters Carlos Pascual de Lara and Nestor Basterretxea, sculptors Lucio Muñoz and Eduardo Chillida, and Xabier Álvarez de Eulate for stained glass windows.

Oteiza thought that images make preaching more effective, and therefore created images of Saint Joseph and the Parable of the Good Samaritan to intensify what Pope Francis said about a culture of welcoming, for example, migrants and people who suffer. He said that the images should not only be beautiful, but should have an expression to give them more impact. He saw that during the evangelisation of Latin America, more devotion was inspired by paintings than sermons. Working with children in Madrid, he noticed a hunger for beauty among them. Oteiza published memoirs such as Aventurero sin equipaje por el Amazonas (Adventurer without luggage on the Amazon), Cartas parroquiales de Angasmarca (Parish Letters from Angasmarca), about his time in Peru, and Manifiesto de misiones (Mission Manifesto), about his time in Latin America in general.

Together with the sculptor Carlos Ciriza he founded a museum, the future Ciriza Oteiza Museum in Estella, built on the grounds of a Capuchin convent on the Camino de Santiago and scheduled to open in 2025.

Oteiza died in Madrid on 4 August 2025, at the age of 99.
