= Gaur (artistic group) =

Basque artist collective in Gipuzkoa

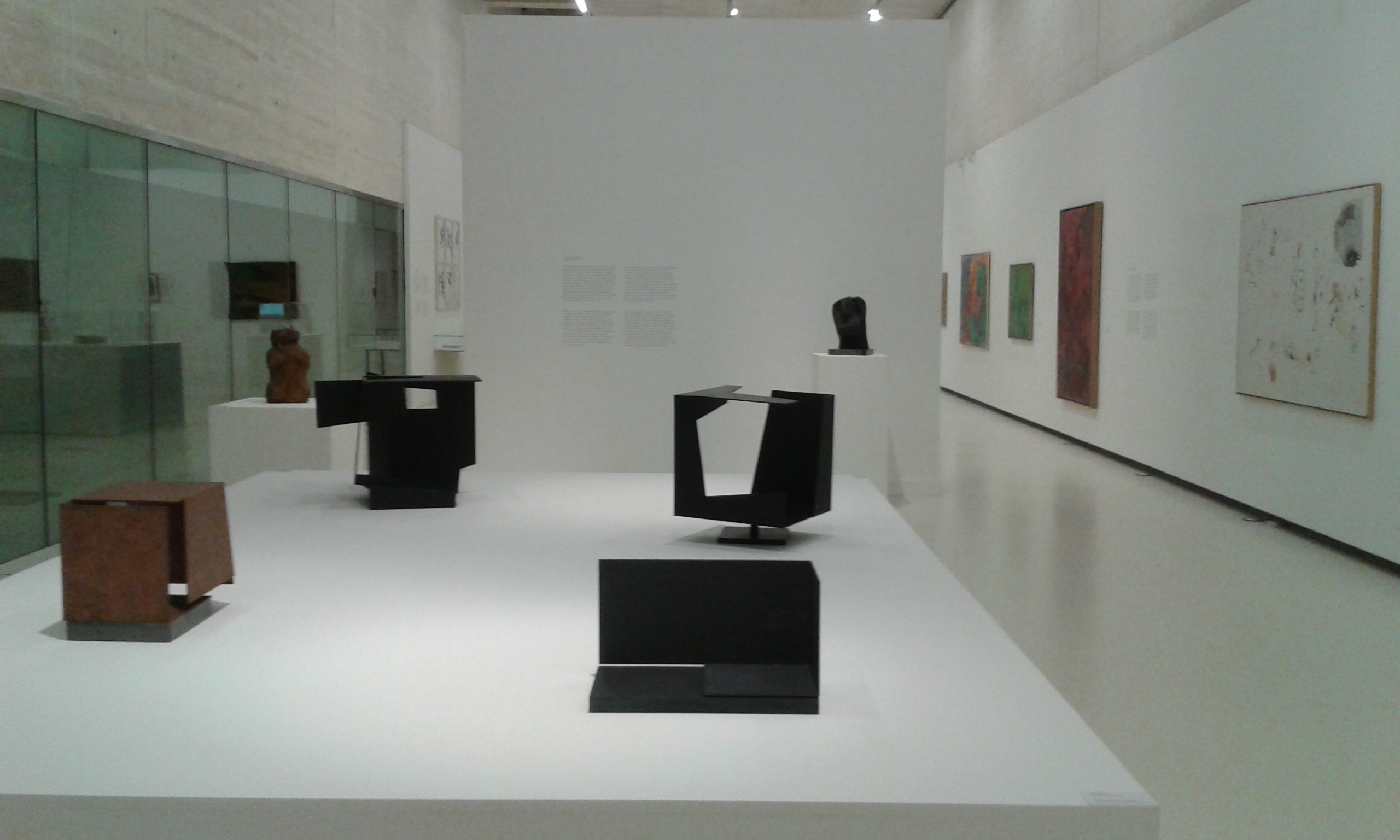
Gaur Konstelazioak exhibition at the San Telmo Museum, San Sebastián (2016)

Gaur ('today' in Basque) was a Basque artistic group founded in 1966 by Amable Arias, Rafael Ruiz Balerdi, Nestor Basterretxea, Eduardo Chillida, Remigio Mendiburu, Jorge Oteiza, José Antonio Sistiaga, and José Luis Zumeta. The avant-garde group, based in Gipuzkoa, Spain, provided the springboard for a wide Basque artistic movement with close links to influential social, cultural and political agents in the Basque Country opposed to Franco's dictatorship during the 70s and early 80s.

The group launched with an exhibition on 28 April 1966 at the Barandiarán Gallery in San Sebastián. It challenged the aesthetic moulds and artistic conventions prevailing during that period in Gipuzkoa, and the Basque Country altogether. The artists founding the movement stirred at the rapid economic and social changes taking place at the moment, the virtually non-existent cultural scene, and the crisis of the Basque collective identity.

It stood out as the most prolific artistic group in a constellation of groups founded across the Basque Country during the same period that made up the Basque Art School.
