= Gouda =

Gouda may refer to:

- Gouda, South Holland, a city in the Netherlands
  - Gouda (pottery), style of pottery manufactured in Gouda
  - Gouda cheese, type of cheese originally made in and around Gouda
  - Gouda railway station
- Gouda, Western Cape, a small town in South Africa with a name of Khoisan origin
- Gōda, a Japanese surname
- Emperor Go-Uda (1265–1324), emperor of Japan
- Gouda rabbit, a breed of rabbit
- Alternative spelling of Gowda (surname)

== See also ==
- Gauda (disambiguation)
- Goda (disambiguation)
- Gowda (disambiguation)
