= Góra (disambiguation) =

Góra (meaning in Polish "hill" or "mountain") may also refer to many places:

The most notable is Góra, a town in Lower Silesian Voivodeship, south-west Poland.

In Greater Poland Voivodeship (west-central Poland):

- Góra, Jarocin County
- Góra, Międzychód County
- Góra, Gmina Pobiedziska
- Góra, Gmina Tarnowo Podgórne
- Góra, Śrem County

In Kuyavian-Pomeranian Voivodeship (north-central Poland):

- Góra, Inowrocław County
- Góra, Mogilno County
- A village now part of Żnin

In Łódź Voivodeship (central Poland):

- Góra, Brzeziny County
- Góra, Sieradz County

In Masovian Voivodeship (east-central Poland):

- Góra, Legionowo County
- Góra, Płock County

In Podlaskie Voivodeship (north-east Poland):

- Góra, Mońki County
- Góra, Suwałki County

In Pomeranian Voivodeship (north Poland):

- Góra, Kościerzyna County
- Góra, Wejherowo County

In Świętokrzyskie Voivodeship (south-central Poland):

- Góra, Busko County
- Góra, Staszów County

In Warmian-Masurian Voivodeship (north Poland):

- Góra, Kętrzyn County
- Góra, Pisz County

In other voivodeships:

- Góra, Lublin Voivodeship (east Poland)
- Góra, Opole Voivodeship (south-west Poland)
- Góra, Silesian Voivodeship (south Poland)

== See also ==
- Gora (disambiguation)
