= Gora Cemetery =

Gora Cemetery may refer to

- Gora Qabaristan, Karachi
- Gora Kabristan, Lahore
- Gora Qabristan, Peshawar
- Gora Kabristan, Bairana
