= Nova Gora =

Nova Gora may refer to the following places in Slovenia:

- Nova Gora, Dolenjske Toplice, a village in the Municipality of Dolenjske Toplice
- Nova Gora, Krško, a village in the Municipality of Krško
- Nova Gora, Litija, a village in the Municipality of Litija
- Nova Gora nad Slovensko Bistrico, a village in the Municipality of Slovenska Bistrica

== See also ==
- Gora (disambiguation)
