= Gora (surname) =

Gora or Góra is a surname with multiple origins. Notable people with the surname include:

- Claudio Gora (1913–1998), Italian actor and director
- Jan Góra (1948–2015), Polish Dominican Roman Catholic priest, Doctor of Theology, academic and chaplain
- Janusz Góra (born 1963), Polish football manager and former player
- Jarosław Góra (born 1964), Polish former footballer
- Jo Ann M. Gora, American academic and college administrator
- Łukasz Góra (born 1993), Polish footballer
- Pyotr Gora (1922–2002), Soviet colonel awarded the title Hero of the Soviet Union
- Renu Gora (fl. 2003–2008), Indian amateur boxer
- Ronald Gora (1933–2014), American swimmer
- Saraswathi Gora (1912–2006), Indian social activist
- Tadeusz Góra (1918–2010), Polish glider pilot and Royal Air Force fighter pilot in World War II
- Tahir Aslam Gora (born 1963), Pakistani-Canadian broadcaster, editor, publisher, translator and writer
- Wilhelm Góra (1916–1975), Polish footballer
