= Gōda =

Gōda, Gouda or Goda (written: 合田 or 郷田, ゴダ) is a Japanese surname. Notable people with the surname include:

- Hiroaki Gōda (合田 浩章; born 1965), Japanese animator
- Hozumi Gōda (郷田 ほづみ; born 1957), Japanese voice actor, narrator and sound director
- Masashi Goda (合田 雅吏; born 1970), Japanese actor
- Masataka Gōda (郷田真隆; born 1971), Japanese shogi player
- Tsuneo Gōda (合田 経郎), Japanese animator
- Yoshimi Goda (合田 良実; 1935–2012), Japanese civil engineer

Fictional characters:

- Kazundo Gōda (合田 一人), a character in the anime series Ghost in the Shell: Stand Alone Complex 2nd Gig
- Ryūji Gōda (郷田 龍司), a fictional character in the video game Yakuza 2
- Hanzō Gōda (郷田 ハンゾウ), a fictional character in the video game and anime Little Battlers Experience

== See also ==
- Emperor Go-Uda (後宇多天皇; 1267–1324), Japanese emperor
- Goda-ikka, a Japanese yakuza group
- Gouda (disambiguation)
- Goda (disambiguation)
