= Goura =

Goura may refer to:

== Places ==
- Goura, Corinthia, a village in Greece
- Goura, Centre Region, Cameroon
- Goura, Far North Region, Cameroon
- Goura Nature Reserve, now part of Gulaga National Park, New South Wales, Australia
- Goura, Phthiotis, a former village in Greece

== Other uses ==
- Goura (bird), a genus of pigeons
- Goura (musical instrument), a mouth-blown stringed musical instrument

== See also ==
- Gora (disambiguation)
