= José Luis Zumeta =

Spanish painter (1939–2020)

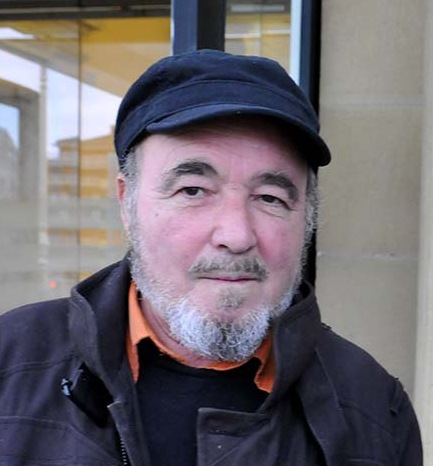
- José Luis Zumeta
- Born: José Luis Zumeta Etxeberria; 19 April 1939; Guipúzcoa, Spain
- Died: 22 April 2020 (aged 81)
- Occupation: Painting

José Luis Zumeta Etxeberria (Guipúzcoa, 19 April 1939 – San Sebastián, ca. 22 April 2020) was a Basque Spanish painter working in an abstract style.

Between 1962 and 1963 he traveled to Stockholm and London, where he would reside for a time. In 1966 he participated in the founding of the one belonging to the so-called Basque School, together with Jorge Oteiza, Eduardo Chillida and Nestor Basterretxea. In 1967 he won the first prize in the Basque Painting Grand Prize competition. In 2002, he exhibited his work at Haim Chanin Fine Arts in New York.

José Luis Zumeta is considered one of the most representative artists of the postwar generation of Basque painters, with the presence of his work in collections of important museums both in the Basque Country and abroad.

== Awards ==
- 1958 - National Gold Medal of the Madrid Young Painting Contest.
- 1967 - First Prize in the Basque Painting Grand Prize Competition.
