= Pyotr Gora =

Pyotr Evstafievich Gora
- Native name: Пётр Евстафьевич Гора
- Born: 28 December 1922; Svetilovka, Belogorsky District, Amur Oblast, RSFSR
- Died: 11 May 2002 (aged 79) Yekaterinburg, Sverdlovsk Oblast, Russia
- Allegiance: Soviet Union
- Branch: Red Army (Infantry); Ministry of Internal Affairs (MVD)
- Service years: 1941—1946 (Red Army) ?-? (MVD)
- Rank: Colonel
- Conflicts: World War II
- Awards: Hero of the Soviet Union

Pyotr Evstafievich Gora (Russian: Пётр Евстафьевич Гора; 28 December 1922 – 11 May 2002) was a colonel of the Soviet Ministry of Internal Affairs, a participant of the Great Patriotic War, and a Hero of the Soviet Union (1943).

== Biography ==
Gora was born on 28 December 1922 in the village of Svetilovka (now in Belogorsky District, Amur Oblast) into a peasant family. He graduated from seven classes of junior high school, after which he worked as a driver at a machine-tractor station.

In July 1941, Gora was drafted into military service with the Red Army by the Kuibyshev RVK of the Khabarovsk Krai. He served on the front line from 1 August 1942 as part of the 248th Separate Cadet Rifle Brigade. By order of the 248th Brigade № 4/n of 4 March 1943, Gora, then serving with the rank of sergeant as assistant platoon commander of the 3rd Rifle Battalion, was awarded the Medal "For Courage". During the offensive on the Kurs station, leading his battalion, he personally killed 10 enemy soldiers.

By September 1943, Senior Sergeant Pyotr Gora was assistant platoon commander of the 248th Cadet Rifle Brigade of the 60th Army of the Central Front. He distinguished himself during the battle of the Dnieper.

On 24 September 1943, Gora, with a group of fighters, was one of the first to cross the Dnieper near the village of Tolokun, Vyshhorod Raion of the Kiev Oblast of the Ukrainian SSR and captured an enemy trench. When the platoon leader was incapacitated, Gora took charge and repelled several enemy counterattacks. In hand-to-hand combat, he personally killed more than 10 enemy soldiers and officers. Gora was wounded in battle, but did not leave the battlefield.

By the decree of the Presidium of the Supreme Soviet of the Soviet Union of 17 October 1943 for "courage and heroism shown during the crossing of the Dnieper and holding a bridgehead on its right bank", Senior Sergeant Pyotr Gora was awarded the title of Hero of the Soviet Union with the award of the Order of Lenin and the Gold Star medal (number 2062).

In 1945, Gora graduated from the Kharkov Military-Political School of the Red Army. In 1946 he was transferred to the reserve. He worked in subdivisions of the Soviet Ministry of Internal Affairs (MVD) in Sverdlovsk. In 1954 he graduated from the Sverdlovsk Law Institute.

Gora retired from the MVD with the rank of colonel. He lived in Yekaterinburg, and died on 11 May 2002, and was buried at the Shirokorechenskoye Cemetery.

Gora was also awarded the Order of the Patriotic War of the 1st degree (1985) and "For Service to the Homeland in the Armed Forces of the USSR" of the 3rd degree, as well as a number of medals.
