= Goda =

Goda may refer to:

== People and fictional characters ==
- Godgifu (daughter of Æthelred the Unready) (c. 1004–c. 1049), also known as Goda of England, English princess
- Goda Ravi (fl. 905/06–c. 943/44 AD), a king of medieval Kerala, south India
- Goda Butkutė (born 1999), Lithuanian pair skater
- Bruno Goda (born 1998), Croatian footballer
- Devin Goda (born 1989), American model and football player
- Jules Goda (born 1989), Cameroonian football player
- Krisztina Goda (born 1970), Hungarian film director
- Norman J. W. Goda (born 1961), American historian
- Gōda, a list of people and fictional characters with the Japanese surnames 合田 or 郷田
- Kuno Goda, a pseudonym used by a German artist

== Places ==
- Göda, a municipality in Saxony, Germany
- Goda, Purba Bardhaman, a census town in West Bengal, India
- Godá, the Afar name of the Goda Mountains, Tadjoura Region, Djibouti

== Other uses ==
- Guild of Drama Adjudicators ("GoDA")

== See also ==
- Goda-ikka, a yakuza group
- Sara al-Qutiyya (Spanish: Sara la Goda), 8th century Visigothic noblewoman
- Godha, a Jain caste in Gujarata, India
- Godha (film), a 2017 Indian Malayalam-language film
- Godas (died 533), Gothic governor of Sardinia
- Gouda (disambiguation)
- Gowda (disambiguation)
- Gauda (disambiguation)
