= Gora, Cerknica =

Gora
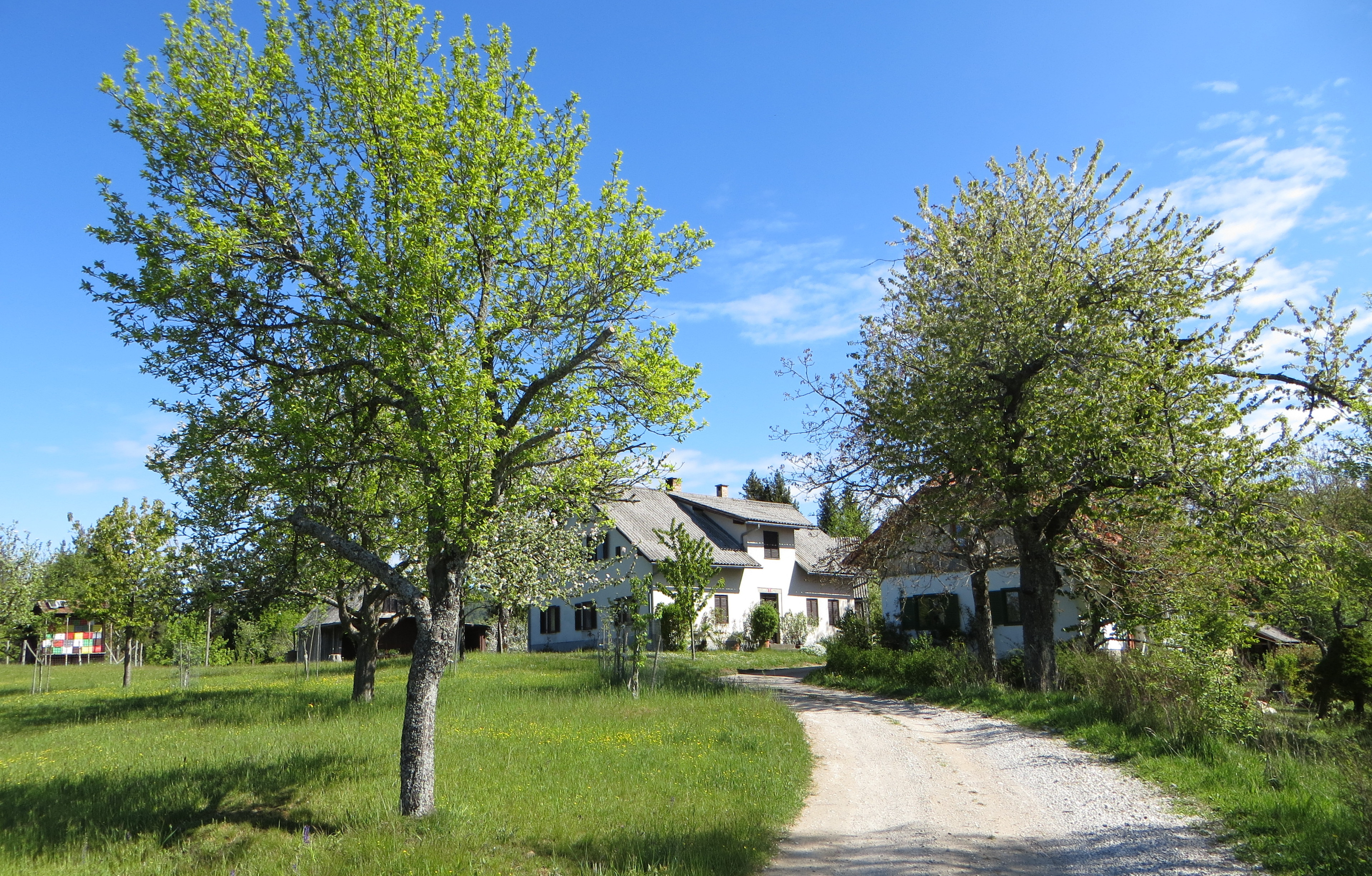

- Location in Slovenia
- Coordinates: 45°49′46.57″N 14°25′47.71″E
- Country: Slovenia
- Traditional region: Inner Carniola
- Statistical region: Littoral–Inner Carniola
- Municipality: Cerknica

Area
  - Total: 1.57 km^{2} (0.61 sq mi)
- Elevation: 729.4 m (2,393 ft)

Population (2020)
  - Total: 3
  - Density: 1.9/km^{2} (4.9/sq mi)

Gora (pronounced [ˈɡɔːɾa]) is a small settlement in the hills northeast of Begunje in the Municipality of Cerknica in the Inner Carniola region of Slovenia.
