= Natharam Sharma Gaur =

- Born: 14 January 1874; Dariyapur, Hathras, British India (present-day Uttar Pradesh, India)
- Died: 7 December 1943 (aged 69); Agra, British India (present-day Agra, Uttar Pradesh, India)
- Occupations: Writer, artist
- Writing career
- Language: Hindi
- Notable works: Amar Singh Rathore, Sultana Daku, Udal ka byah, Sangeet Harishchandra, Virangana Virmati

Natharam Sharma Gaur (1874 – 1943) was a writer and artist of Nautanki (North India's operatic theatre) plays of Indarman Akhara of Hathras in what is now Uttar Pradesh, India. Nautanki drama was larger than life. The predecessor to Bollywood extravaganzas, it was the world full of glamour, glitz, and pure fantasy. Song, dance, romance and melodrama wove many a magic spell. Popular dramas performed in this genre were peopled with historical figures like Raja Harishchandra, who gave up wealth, kingdom, wife and child for the sake of keeping his word.

== Early life ==
Natharam was born on 14 January 1874 in the village of Dariyapur in the Hathras District to a Brahmin family. He was from a very poor family. He came to Hathras as a child guiding his blind father, Bhagirathmal, and singing for alms. His sweet voice and charming face attracted the attention of Chiranjilal, one of the disciples of Indarman Akhara of Hathras. Nataharam was adopted by the Akhara where he learned classical music and dance along with reading and writing. Natharam mastered the art in very short span and became a star of his troop. Later on he made his own troop and started a printing press 'Shyam.' Natharam performed his plays in North America, Indonesia, Mauritius, and Myanmar. In Rangoon many people learnt Hindi for the sole purpose of understanding the plays of Natharam.

== Career ==
Natharam wrote 113 plays between 1897 and 1940.
