= Kuno Goda =

Kuno Goda is a pseudonymous Germany-based artist.

By his own account Goda was born in the GDR in the 1980s.
The name Kuno Goda is a pseudonym, borrowed in part from Konrad Zuse, creator of the first working computer and a painter under the guise “Kuno See”.
With a degree in engineering, most of Goda's works relate to technology in some way.
He owes his foray into the international art scene to the digital currencies Bitcoin and Ethereum.
His work "200 Bitcoins" was inspired by Andy Warhol's 1962 painting 200 One Dollar Bills and is regarded to be the first contemporary artwork for digital currency. The work is dedicated to anonymous bitcoin protocol creator Satoshi Nakamoto. In March 2014 the work was sold to a Seattle businessman for an undisclosed amount. The Wall Street Journal reported a selling price of $125.000 but the artist later clarified that the price was much lower.
His Ethereum-related work "Glideth" features all four permutations of the renowned hacker emblem the "Glider", hand-printed on a copper-clad plate.
On World Press Freedom Day 2016 he published a book called "Tell All - How To Bypass Media Censorship". As a commentary to book censorship, the book itself is 90% blacked out.

== See also ==
- Alternative currency
- Bitcoin
- Andy Warhol
- Contemporary Art
