= Bairhana =

Human settlement in India

Coordinates: 25.441°N 81.855°E

Bairhana (Hindi: बैरहना)is a locality/township of Prayagraj, Uttar Pradesh, India. The township of Bairhana is further divided into two localities: New Bairhana and the Old Bairhana. Near Bairhana chauraha is a colonial era cemetery, called the "Gora Kabristan", where the dead bodies of British soldiers killed during 1857 revolt were buried.
