= Gora (given name) =

Gora is a given name which may refer to:

== Men ==
- Gora Camara (born 2001), Senegalese basketball player
- Gora Diouf (born 2003), Senegalese footballer
- Gora Ebrahim (1936–1999), South African politician and anti-apartheid activist
- Gora Kumbhar (c. 1267–c. 1317), Hindu sant
- Gora Singh, 14th century Rajput warrior
- Gora Tall (born 1985), Senegalese footballer

== Women ==
- Gora Dhay (1646–1704)
