= Brahmjit Gaur =

Brahmin general

Brahmjit Gaur, was a Brahmin general in the army of Sher Shah Suri, the founder of the Suri Empire in India. He was considered one of Sher Shah's best generals and was known for his military prowess and strategic thinking. Though Satish Chandra claims that he was a Sur known by name Kur.

After the Battle of Chausa and Bilgram, where Sher Shah defeated the Mughal emperor Humayun, Brahmjit Gaur was sent in pursuit of Humayun to ensure that he did not regroup and pose another threat to Sher Shah's rule. Brahmjit Gaur proved to be a fierce warrior and succeeded in preventing Humayun from making any further advances for a period of time.

In addition to Brahmjit Gaur, Raja Ram Shah of Gwalior was also in the service of Sher Shah Suri. Raja Ram Shah was a trusted ally of Sher Shah and played an important role in consolidating his power in northern India.

Sher Shah's reliance on generals like Brahmjit Gaur and Raja Ram Shah highlights the importance of skilled military leadership in the success of any ruler. Their loyalty and dedication to Sher Shah helped him establish a stable and prosperous kingdom, which laid the foundation for the later Mughal Empire in India.
