= Gora, Krško =

Gora Gora Svetega Lovrenca (until 1955)
- Location in Slovenia
- Coordinates: 45°58′19.25″N 15°27′5.45″E
- Country: Slovenia
- Traditional region: Lower Carniola
- Statistical region: Lower Sava
- Municipality: Krško

Area
  - Total: 0.87 km^{2} (0.34 sq mi)
- Elevation: 424.5 m (1,393 ft)

Population (2002)
  - Total: 45

Gora (pronounced [ˈɡɔːɾa]; German: Sankt Lorenzberg) is a small village in the hills northwest of Leskovec in the Municipality of Krško in eastern Slovenia. The area is part of the traditional region of Lower Carniola. It is now included with the rest of the municipality in the Lower Sava Statistical Region.

== Name ==
The name of the settlement was changed from Gora Svetega Lovrenca (literally, 'Mount Saint Lawrence') to Gora (literally, 'mountain') in 1955. The name was changed on the basis of the 1948 Law on Names of Settlements and Designations of Squares, Streets, and Buildings as part of efforts by Slovenia's postwar communist government to remove religious elements from toponyms. In the past the German name was Sankt Lorenzberg.

== Church ==
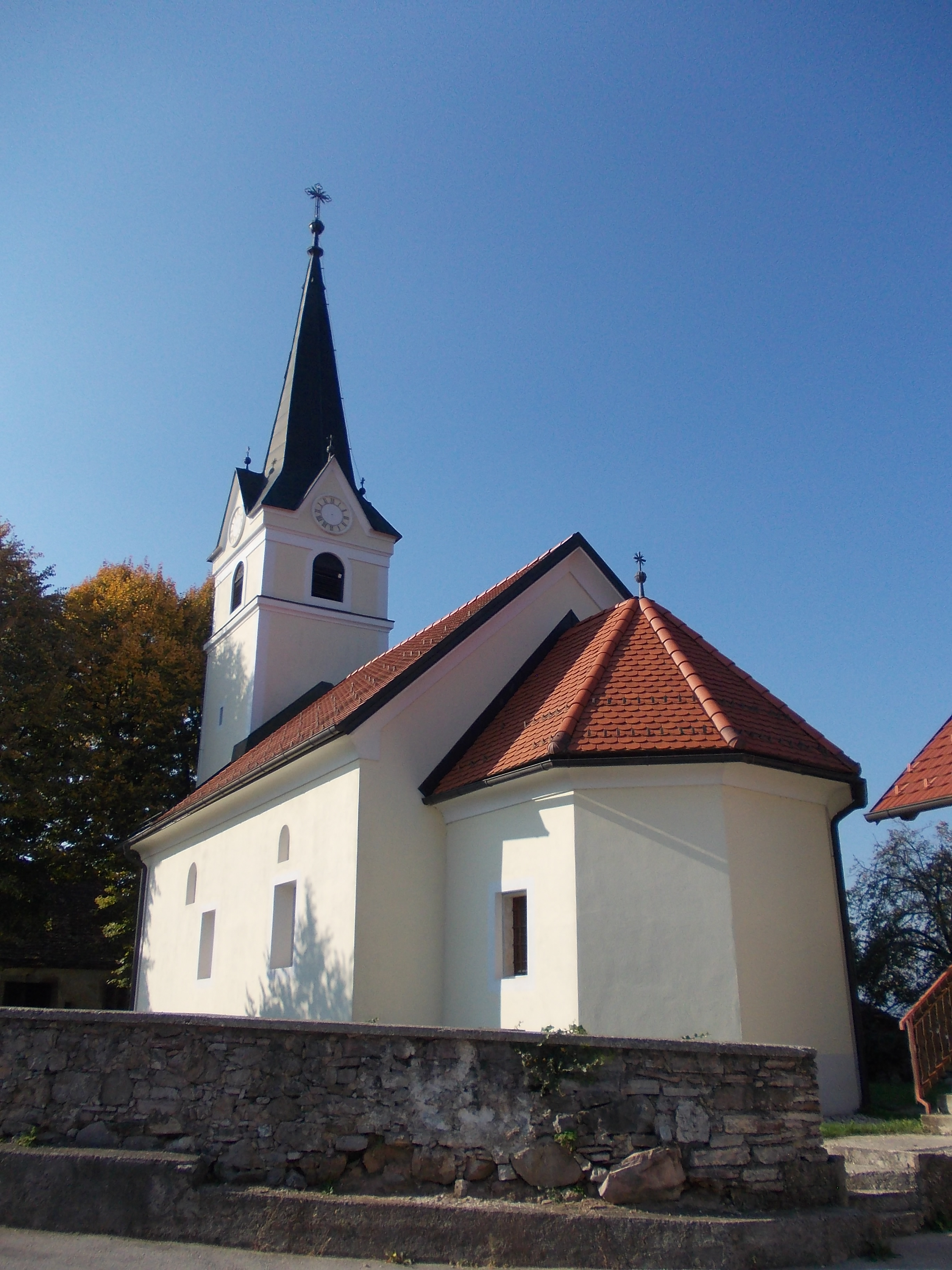
St. Lawrence's Church

The local church, built in the northern part of the village, is dedicated to Saint Lawrence and belongs to the Parish of Krško. It is a Romanesque building that was partly rebuilt in the 19th century. Some Roman material was re-used in the original construction of the church.
