= Gaura, Kapurthala =

Gaura
- Village
- Location in Punjab, India Gaura (India)
- Coordinates: 31.411681°N 75.342675°E
- Country: India
- State: Punjab
- District: Kapurthala

Government
  - Type: Panchayati raj (India)
  - Body: Gram panchayat

Population (2011)
  - Total: 475
- Sex ratio 239/236♂/♀

Languages
  - Official: Punjabi
  - Other spoken: Hindi
- Time zone: UTC+5:30 (IST)
- PIN: 144601
- Telephone code: 01822
- ISO 3166 code: IN-PB
- Vehicle registration: PB-09
- Website: kapurthala.gov.in

Gaura is a village in Kapurthala district of Punjab State, India. It is located 5 kilometres (3.1 mi) from Kapurthala, which is both district and sub-district headquarters of Gaura. The village is administrated by a Sarpanch, who is an elected representative.

== Demography ==
According to the report published by Census India in 2011, Gaura has a total number of 105 houses and population of 475 of which include 239 males and 236 females. Literacy rate of Gaura is 64.29%, lower than state average of 75.84%. The population of children under the age of 6 years is 55 which is 11.58% of total population of Gaura, and child sex ratio is approximately 897, higher than state average of 846.

== Population data ==
Particulars	Total	Male	Female
Total No. of Houses	105	-	-
Population	475	239	236
Child (0-6)	55	29	26
Schedule Caste	208	109	99
Schedule Tribe	0	0	0
Literacy	64.29 %	70.48 %	58.10 %
Total Workers	164	145	19
Main Worker	163	0	0
Marginal Worker	1	1	0

== Air travel connectivity ==
The closest airport to the village is Sri Guru Ram Dass Jee International Airport.
