= Richa Gaur =

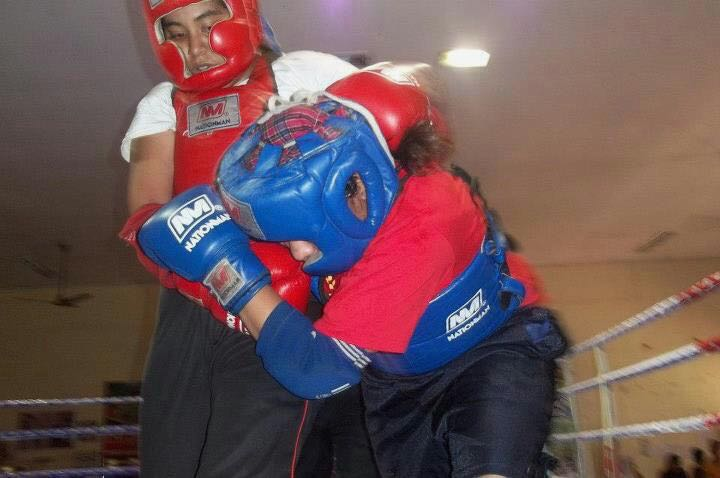
- Born: 10 December 1993 (age 31); Jaipur, India
- Education: B.Com
- Occupation(s): Sports person and coach
- Years active: 2011-present
- Organization(s): Global Institute of Self-defense and Martial arts

Richa Gaur (born 10 December 1993) is an Indian martial arts competitor and self-defense instructor who has been honored and felicitated as one of the "Top 100 Women Achievers of India" by the former President of India and Maneka Gandhi in the field of women's empowerment. She is an international gold and bronze medalist in martial arts.

She has been called the "Muay Thai Queen of India" for her gold hat trick in Muay thai championship. Gaur is an Asian Olympic Games qualifier (Muay Thai Boxing), bronze medalist in World championship, gold medalist in South Asian Championship (Taekwondo), gold medalist in Kukkiwon Korean Cup and seven-time national gold medalist of India. She is the coach and Joint Secretary of the Jaipur Taekwondo Association and is a member of Rajasthan Muay Thai Association.

Gaur marked her presence in 2017 Pro Kabaddi League season singing Jana Gana Mana (the Indian national anthem).

== Early life ==
Richa Gaur was born on 10 December 1993, in Jaipur, capital of Rajasthan state. She is the second child of Mr. Deep Singh who is a librarian in Malaviya National Institute of Technology, Jaipur. Unfortunately she was the premature baby with the weight of only 1.6 kg so her parents took care of her with extra efforts for her survival as doctors recommended. Gaur has one elder sister and one younger brother.

Her parents urged her to be an engineer but seeing her passion towards martial arts her father supported her.

== Career ==
At the age of six, Gaur joined the extracurricular activity Taekwondo, a martial arts style, arranged by school administration where she had developed an interest to learn more and more martial art's styles. She took local coaches training to sharp her martial arts skills and established herself. At the same time she participate in many inter school competitions and won medals.

In 2011, Gaur won a silver medal in Rajasthan Taekwondo Junior Championship at Ajmer which was her life's turning point as she said in an interview. After this she won many gold, silver and bronze medals in different martial arts styles like judo, karate, Muay Thai and taekwondo. at state and national level when she was in college. In 2012, she was selected in Rajasthan State team for National championship organised by Muay Thai India. in this championship she gained attention by winning a gold medal and became Rajasthan state record holder as the first national gold medalist from Rajasthan in both men's and women's categories.

In 2013 she joined India team for advanced training, organised by M.H. Abid (President of MTI), to participate in the World Muay Thai Championship, Bangkok. She showed her talent in Amateur category for first time in an International ring on 19 March 2013 and 23 March 2013 few days after her first international performance she made India proud by winning her first international bronze medal in Pre-amateur category and again listed herself in Rajasthan state record holder.

Same year she won gold in Taekwondo and Muaythai. In 2014 she won her fifth national gold in Muay Thai Nationals and made a hat trick of gold in three consecutive years for which she was called "Muay Thai Queen of India."

In October, 2015 she again represented India in the South Asian Taekwondo Championship and this time won gold.

Gaur has a martial arts institute named "Global Institute of Self-Defense and Martial Arts" that promotes the need to know self-defense techniques in girls in Indian states. She had trained 60,000 youth including Rajasthan Police, Haryana Police, Reserve Bank of India employees, State Bank of India employees, Non-governmental organization, PTI's, college & school girls.

For her efforts and achievements, she was listed in Top 100 women achievers of India on 22 January 2015 and honored by Former President of India Pranab Mukherjee and Maneka Gandhi in the field of Women's empowerment.

== Awards and recognition ==
Year	Award	Medal
2012	National Muay Thai Championship, Hyderabaad	Gold
2013	National Myay Thai Championship, Hyderabaad	Gold
2013	National Taekwondo Championship	Gold
2014	National Muay Thai Championship, Hyderabad	Gold
2014	Kukkiwon Korean Cup	Gold
2015	South Asian Taekwondo Championship	Gold
2017	National Muay Thai Cup	

- Mumbai Global Award, Mumbai - actor Rajpal Yadav and Anuj Joshi
- Vivekanand Gaurav Award - Rajasthan Yuva Sansthan
- Top 100 Women Achievers of India, 2015 - Ministry of Women & Child Development
- Women Achievement award by Diya Kumari
- Ikeda Trophy by Rajpoot Sabha
- Sung National Anthem at Pro Kabaddi 2017
