= Gauda =

Gauda may refer to:

- Gauda brahmins, one of the five Pancha-Gauda Brahmin communities of North india
- Gauda (caste), or Gopal, a caste of Odisha
- Gauḍa (city), Bengal
- Gauḍa (region), Bengal
- Gauda Kingdom, a kingdom during the 5th to 7th century in Bengal (present-day Gauda city)
- Gauda (king), ruler of Numidia during 1st century BC
- Gaudu, Nepal, a village in the Gandaki Zone
- Alternative spelling of Gowda (surname)

== See also ==
- Gaudiya Nritya, a Bengali school of Indian dance
- Gavdos, an island in the Mediterranean Sea
- Gour (disambiguation)
- Gaur (disambiguation)
- Gaura (disambiguation)
- Gouda (disambiguation)
