= Ghora =

Village in Pakistan

Ghora is a village located near Tarutteh in Azad Kashmir in Pakistan. It is one of the oldest villages in Dadyal.

Large numbers of Ghora's residents are from the United Kingdom, and have in recent years invested and spent much money into the region. As a result, the area has developed amenities such as large villas and shopping centres.
