= Mahendra Gaur =

Indian Oil Corporation Limited
- In office 5 February 1977 – 8 February 2000

Advocate Rajasthan High Court Supreme Court of India
- In office 20 June 2009 – Continues

Personal details
- Born: 26 January 1956 Nasirabad, Ajmer
- Spouse: Shashi Gaur
- Children: Mandakini Gaur; Kapil Gaur
- Education: Malaviya National Institute of Technology; Management Development Institute

Mahendra Gaur (born 26 January 1956) is an Indian lawyer.

== Early life ==
Mahendra Gaur born on 26 January 1956 at Nasirabad (Ajmer) spent his early years in Jodhpur, Jaipur, Udaipur for education. In 1967 he was selected for National Merit Scholarship and sponsored to Vidya Bhawan Public School, Udaipur for schooling. In 1971 he enrolled for engineering in Malaviya Regional Engineering College (now Malaviya National Institute of Technology) and graduated in 1976 with a degree in Mechanical Engineering.

== Career ==
Mahendra Gaur joined Indian Oil Corporation Limited in February 1977. He underwent one-year training on "Utilization of Fuels and Lubricants in I. C. Engines and Industrial Machinery at Indian Institution of Petroleum, Dehradun as sponsored candidate from Indian Oil. He worked as Lubricant Technologist at Mumbai, Bhopal, Rajkot, Ahemdabad offices of Indian Oil. In 1989, he was sponsored by Indian Oil and Department of Personnel and Training, Government of India to National Management Program conducted by Management Development Institute, Gurgaon. The National Management Program was brainchild of Rajiv Gandhi and coordinated by P. Chidambaram. The National Management Program was supported by the three Indian Institute of Management, Ahemdabad, Banguluru, and Kolkata and XLRI Jamshedpur. On successful completion of NMP, he was awarded PGDM at a convocation ceremony attended by Manmohan Singh as chief guest.

== Malpractices in Sale of 2T Oil ==
In 1993, while working for Indian Oil at Jaipur he discovered that two-wheeler owners were cheated by petrol pump dealers in the name of "single oil" and "double oil". The recommended dosage of 2T Oil in two-wheeler is 20ml/liter of Petrol, but the petrol pump dealers used to charge for 30 ml in the name of single oil but actually deliver 20 ml to the vehicle owners. Likewise in the name of "double oil" the consumer was given 40 ml, but charged for 60 ml. Mahendra Gaur fought a prolonged battle within Indian Oil, with the State Government of Rajasthan, Government of India to get relief to the two- and three-wheeler consumers.

== Legal Practice ==
In 2009, Bar Council of Rajasthan enrolled Mahendra Gaur as Advocate. He combines rare combination of Engineering and Management into Legal Profession. In 2009 when no one after 2009 Jaipur fire was ready to take up cudgels with the Government, he lodged FIR against Indian Oil and the Police Officers responsible for delay in investigating the criminal angle against Jaipur Fire. Mahendra Gaur represented widows of Indian Oil Fire in their quest for just and fair compensation and justice for their slain husbands. He is presently on a mission to introduce judicial reforms in Rajasthan High Court.

== Rajasthan High Court ==
Rajasthan High Court had a poor record of implementing Right to Information Act and using Internet. Through a sustained campaign Mahendra Gaur introduced fundamental changes in the working of Rajasthan High Court. Mahendra Gaur compelled Rajasthan High Court to frame Rules and upload it on Internet. In the matter of 2009 Jaipur fire Mahendra Gaur has been appointed counsel by the Rajasthan State Legal Services Authority to represent the widows of Indian Oil Officers and other victims who lost their husband in the Fire Tragedy.
