= Nestor Basterretxea =

Basque artist

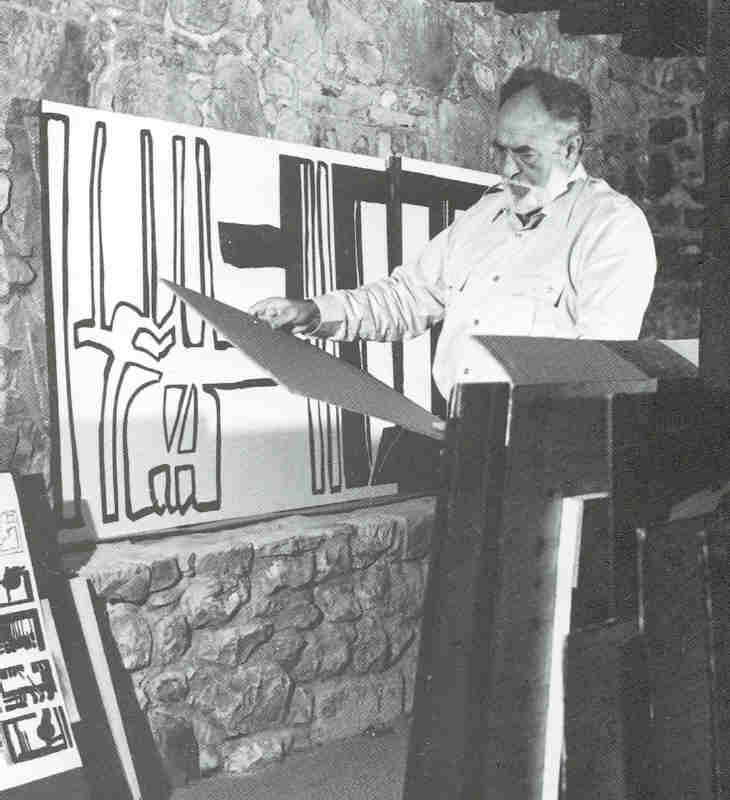
- Born: Nestor Basterretxea Arzadun; 6 May 1924; Bermeo, Basque Country
- Died: 12 July 2014 (aged 90); Hondarribia, Gipuzkoa, Basque Country
- Occupation(s): Sculptor, Painter, Film producer

Nestor Basterretxea Arzadun (6 May 1924 – 12 July 2014) was a Basque artist, born in Bermeo, Biscay, Basque Country. In the 1950s and 1960s, he spearheaded along with other artists such as Jorge Oteiza, Remigio Mendiburu, or Eduardo Chillida, an avant-garde artistic movement concerned with the crisis of Basque identity, and formally a special focus on large volumes and the concept of emptiness.

== Career ==
In 1952 Basterretxea was commissioned along with other Basque artists the reconstruction of the Franciscan Sanctuary of Arantzazu. He was assigned the works to design the paintings covering the crypt. After a year-long period and halfway to completion, the paintings were held to be controversial by Church officials and works were suspended sine die. Despite their completion in 1984, the paintings were publicly unveiled and put on show only in September 2009, after an agreement was finally reached with the veteran artist. The Arantzazu reconstruction project paved the way to the establishment of the influential artistic group Gaur ('today') in the 1960s.

In 1973, he presented in Bilbao's Museo de Bellas Artes (Bilbao Fine Arts Museum) his work Serie Cosmogonica Vasca (Basque Cosmogonic Series), which included some 19 works made in wood depicting Basque Mythology motifs. In 2008, Nestor donated this series to the Bilbao Fine Arts Museum.

In the 1980s Basterretxea became Culture Councillor for the Basque Government for two years. In 1982, he created the seven branched tree that heads the Basque Parliament. Towards the end of that decade, he created two of his best known works: La Paloma de Paz (Peace Dove), initially installed at the Zurriola seafront, Donostia (San Sebastian), later on moved to a roundabout outside the Anoeta Stadium of the same city, and back to the same location somewhat later. In 1989, the Memorial to the Basque Shepherd was installed in Reno, Nevada. When Basterretxea entered his seventh decade of life, he started to reflect the Basque conflict in his work.

Basterretxea also engaged in film making, with short films such as Operación H (1963), Pelotari (1964), as well as Alquézar, retablo de pasión (1965), as well as several other documentaries. In 1968, he came back onto the spotlight with the full feature documentary Ama Lur - Tierra Madre ('mother earth'), co-directed with Fernando Larruquert. Despite the documentary's countless difficulties with Franco's regime's censorship, it ultimately made it through to the San Sebastián International Film Festival, to public and critical acclaim.

Basterretxea died at his home in Hondarribia in the morning of 12 July 2014, at the age of 90.

== Gallery ==
Some sculptures by Nestor Basterretxea
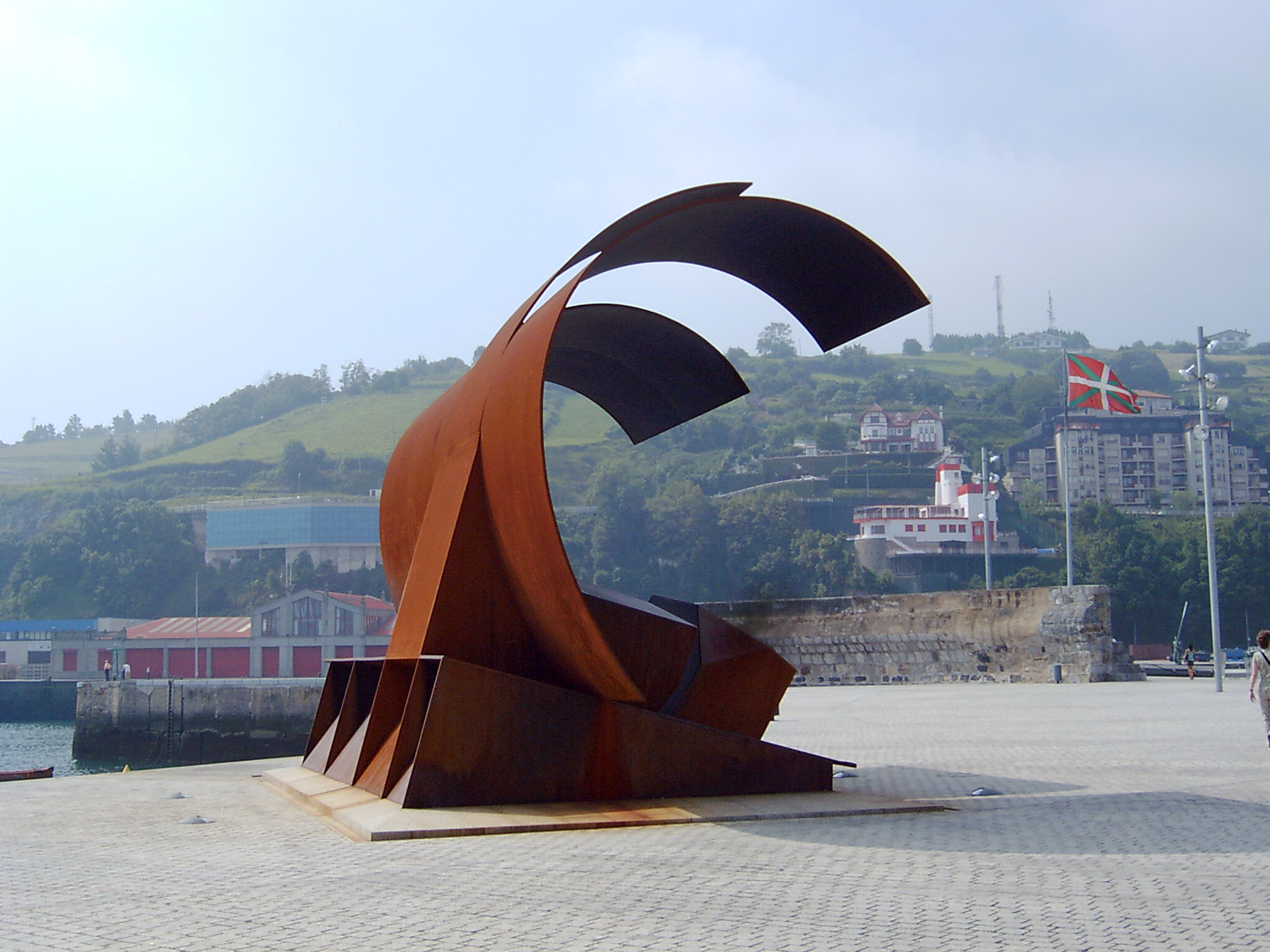
Curled sculpture depicting a wave in Bermeo

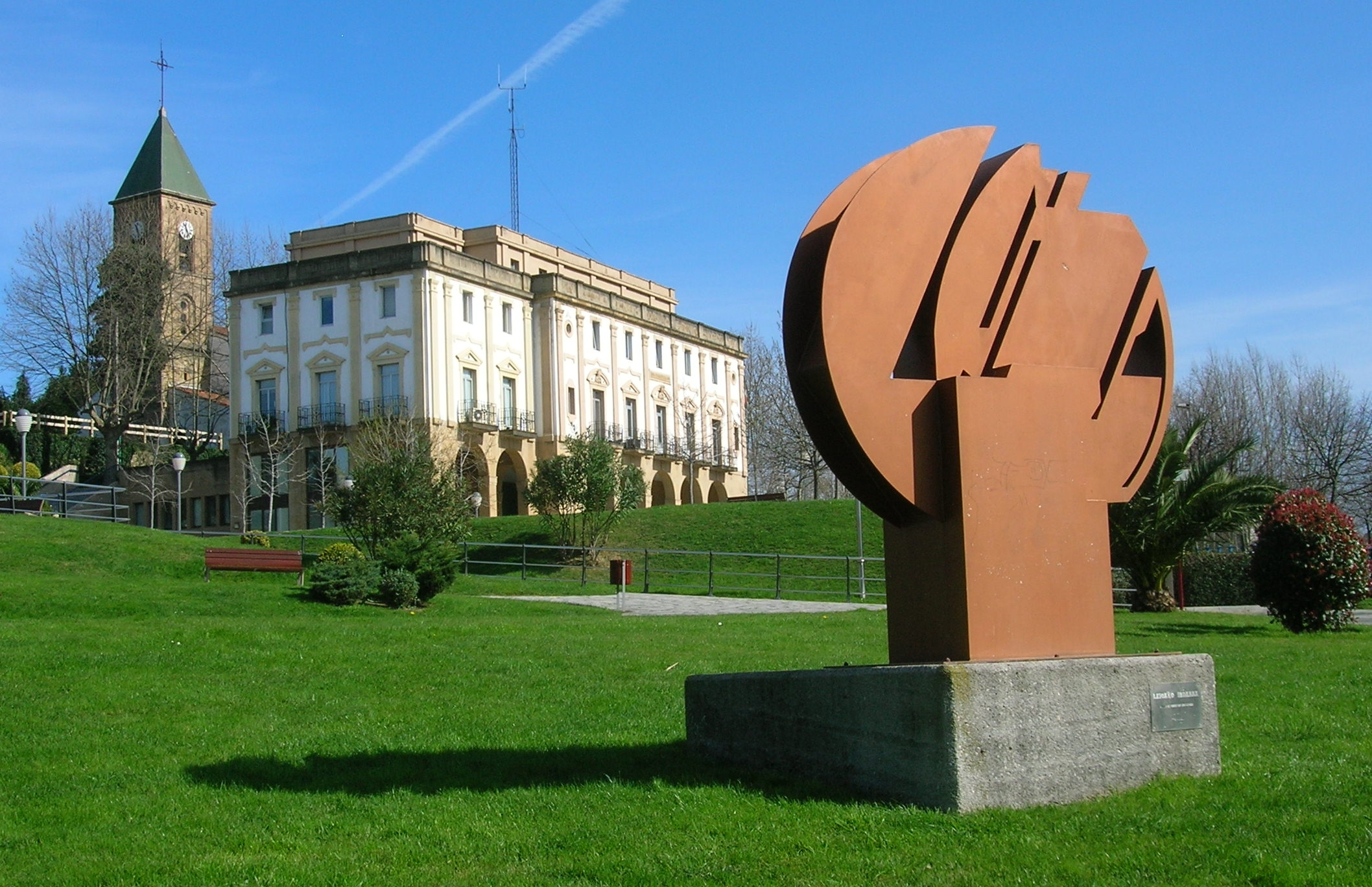
Leioako indarra next to a church (Biscay)

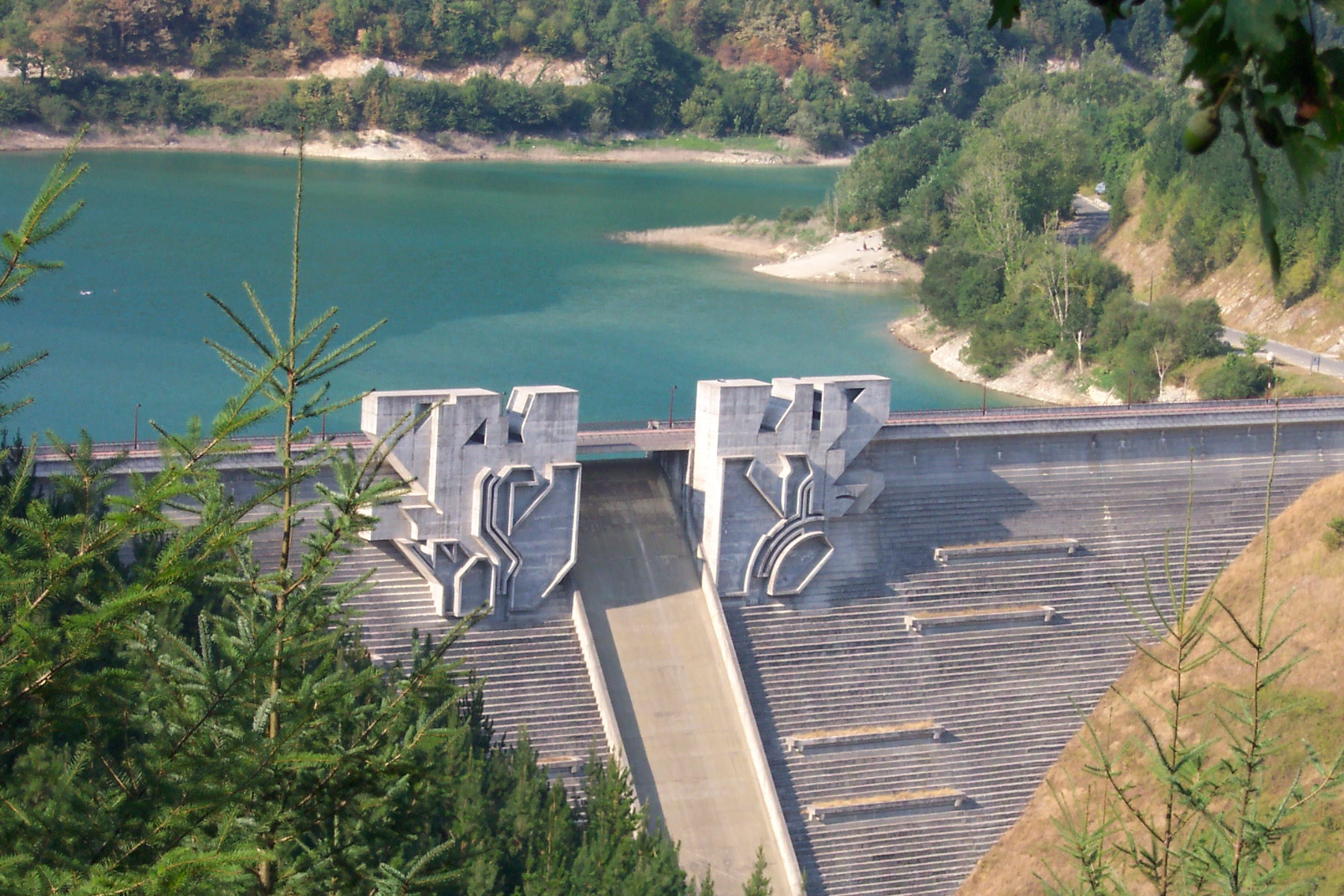
Sculpture perched on the front of the dam of Arriaran (Gipuzkoa)

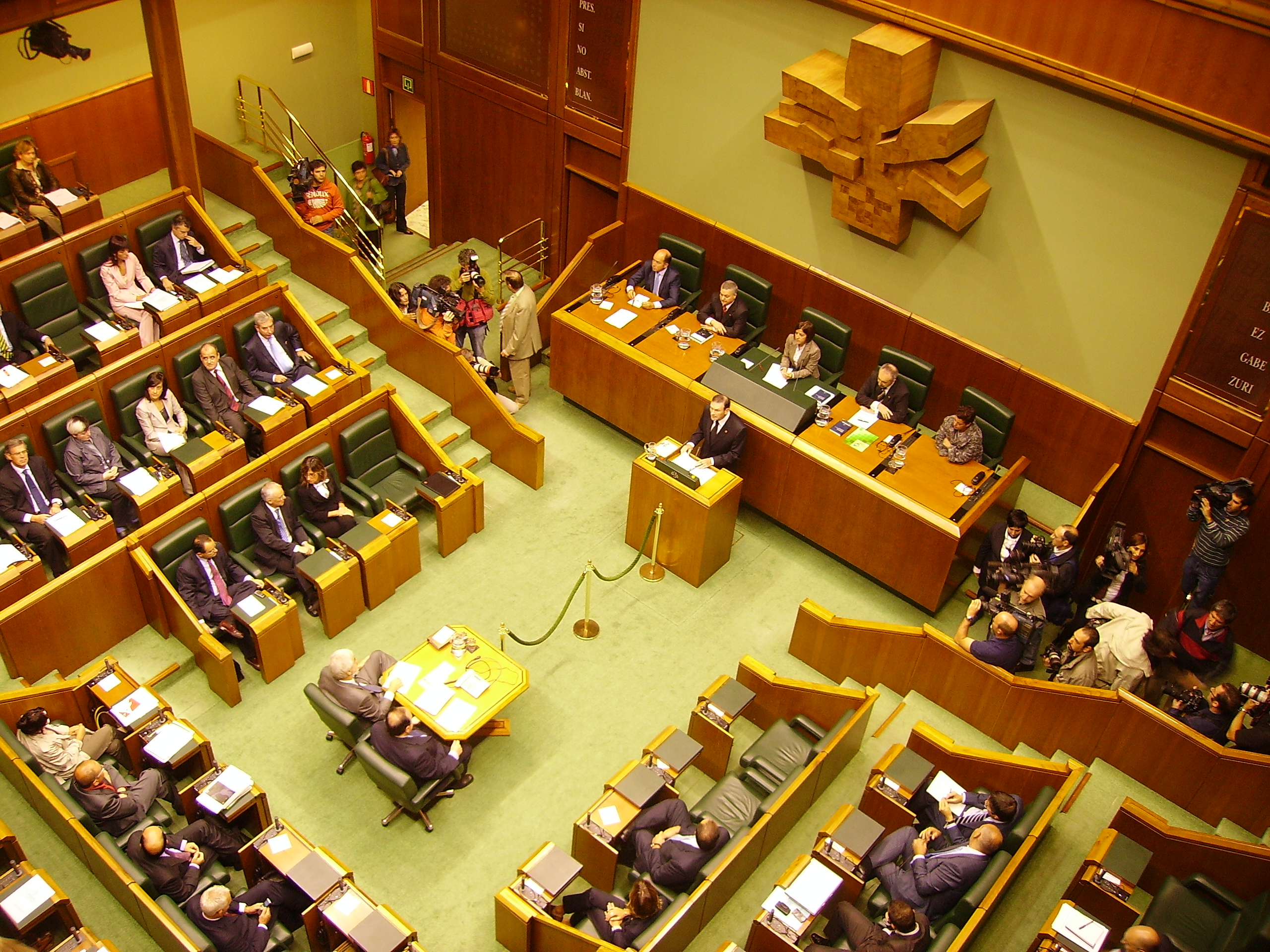
Depiction of a tree with seven branches presiding over the Basque Parliament

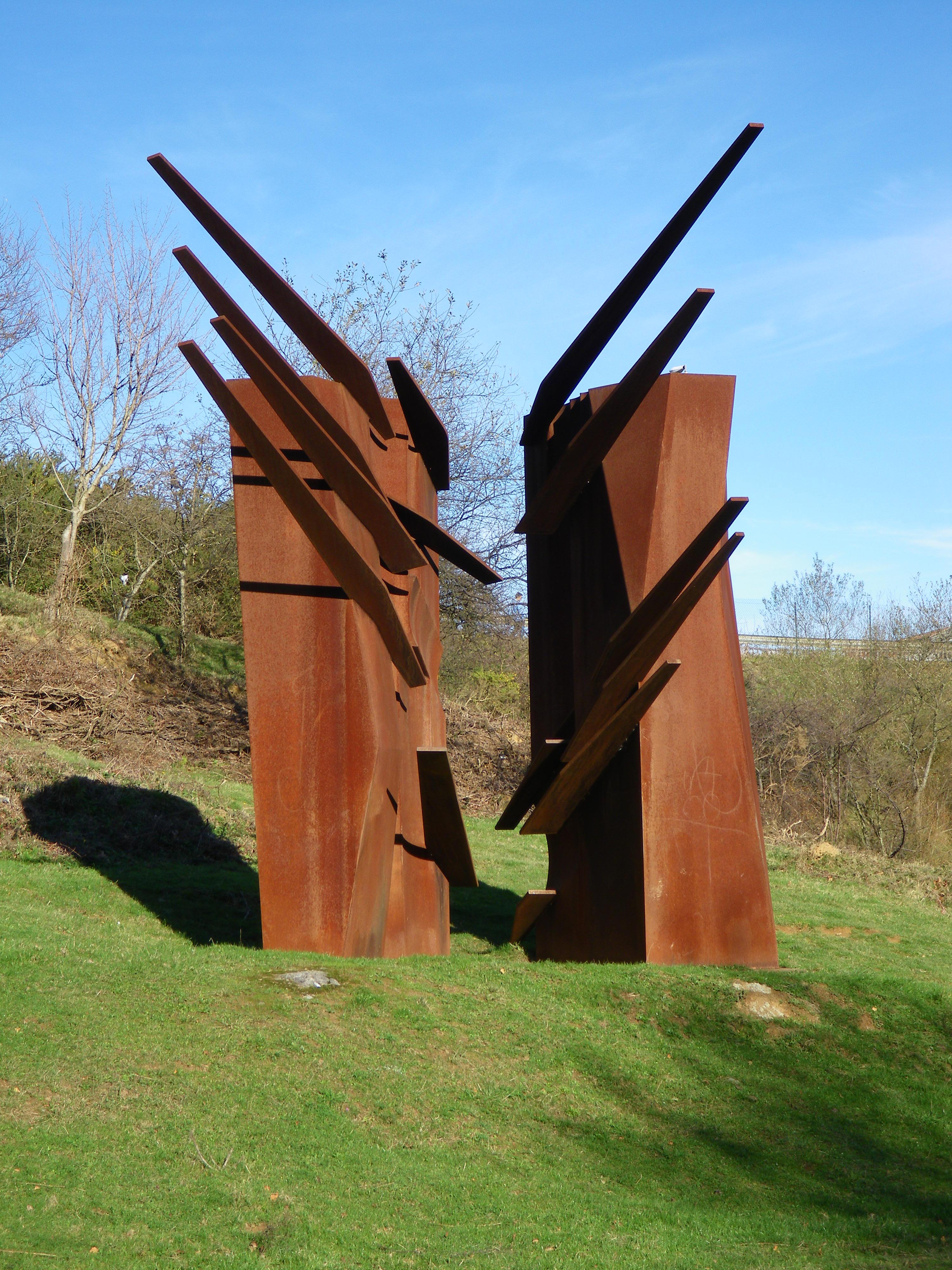
Lurraren alde of the Basque sculptors Park "Meatzaldea Goikoa" in La Arboleda-Zugaztieta.
