= Gowda (surname) =

Indian surname

Gowda (IPA: [ɡɐu̯ɖɐ], also known as Gauda, Gouda or Gonda) is a surname native to Karnataka, India. It is mainly found among the Vokkaligas in South Karnataka and the Lingayats in North Karnataka. It is also used by other communities like Kurubas, Namadhari Naiks, and Billavas.

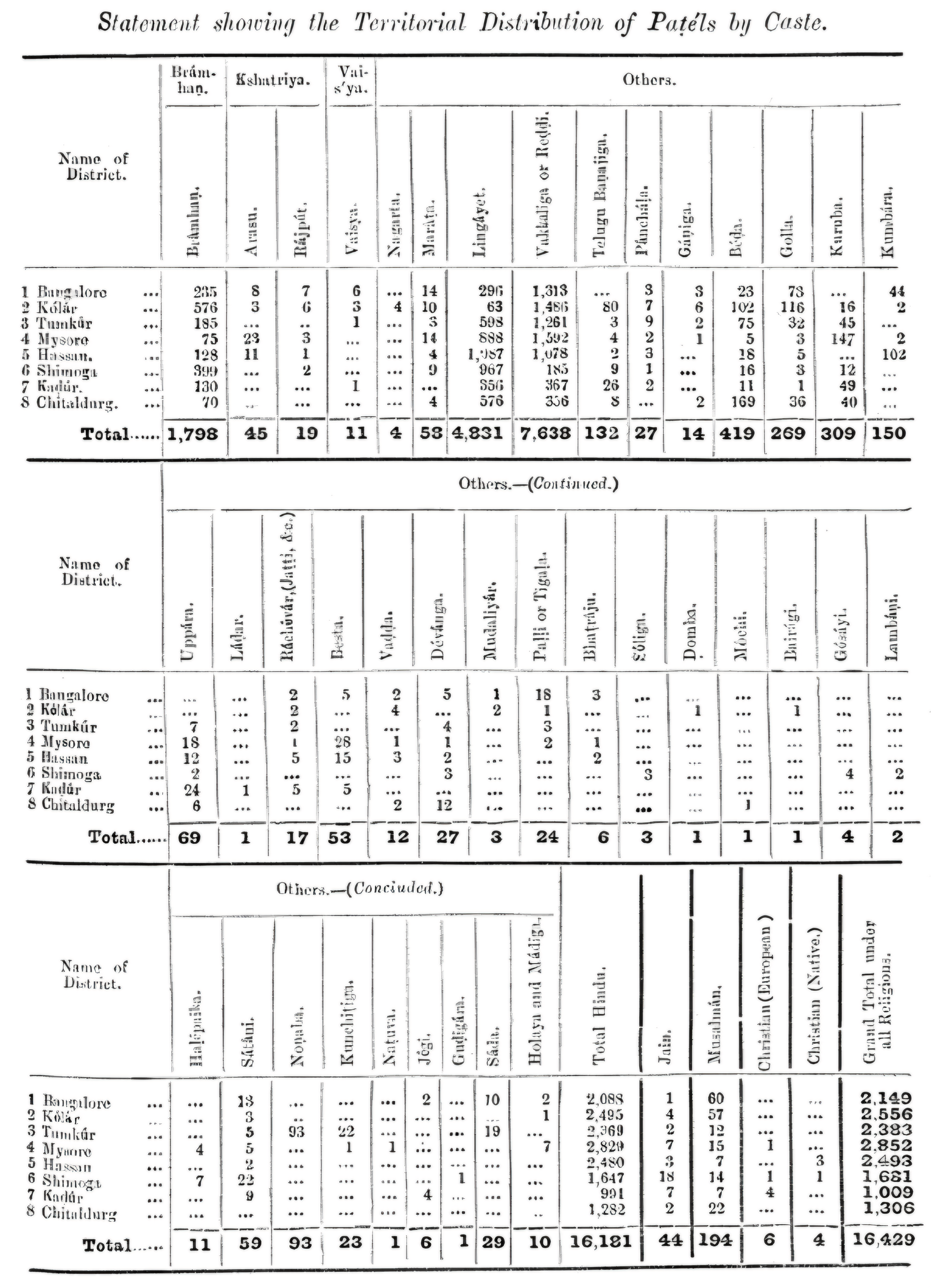
Distribution of village headmen (Gowdas / Patels) by caste in Mysore Kingdom in 1891

Gowda was originally an honorific used by the administrative head of a village. Typically, such a head owned land and held political and social sway in the village. Among Kurubas, it was used to refer to the head of the community.

== Etymology ==
According to historian Suryanath U. Kamath, the word Gowda derives from Gavunda. The German Indologist Gustav Oppert opined that the root of 'Gowda' is a Dravidian word meaning "mountain". The term Gowda and its archaic forms in Old Kannada such as Gamunda, Gavunda, Gavuda, Gonda, appear frequently in the inscriptions of Karnataka. The Epigraphia Carnatica is replete with references to land grants, donations to temples, hero-stones (Veeragallu), stone edicts and copper plates dating back to the age of the Western Ganga Dynasty (est. 350 CE) and earlier. The Gavundas were landlords that collected taxes and rendered military service to the Kings. Noboru Karashima says the Gavundas had functions corresponding to that of the Chola Vellala Nattars. While the majority of the gavundas were derived from the Vokkaligas; by the 10th century, the term gavunda also came to denote chiefship of a community or group and was adopted by the heads of other communities assimilated into the early medieval state.

== Notable people with surname Gowda ==
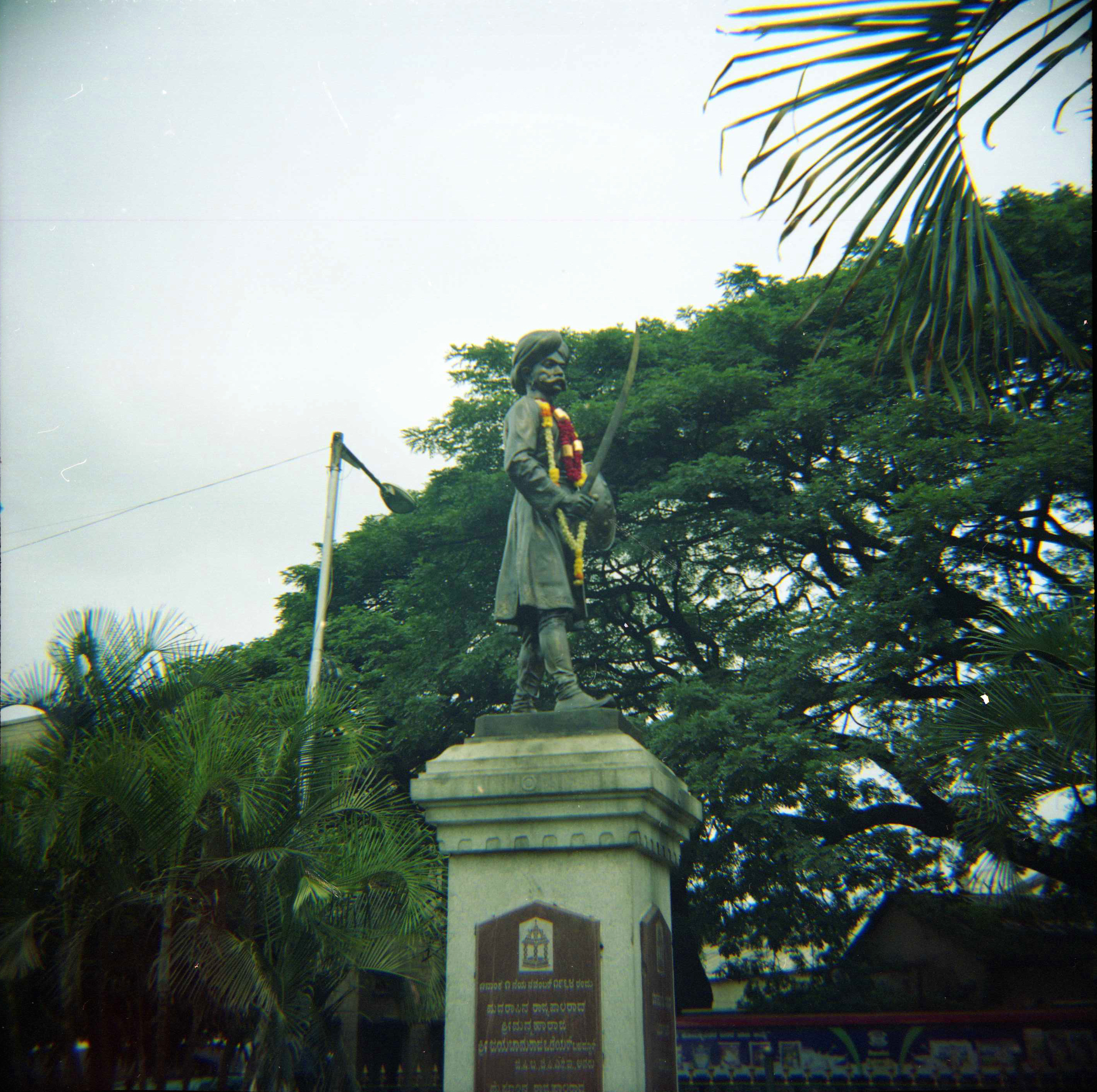
Kempegowda I, founder of the Bengaluru city

Notable people with the surname Gowda:

=== Agriculture ===
- M. H. Marigowda, Indian horticulturist

=== Film ===
- Akshara Gowda (born 1991), Indian actress from Karnataka
- Ambareesh (born 1952 as Huche Gowda Amarnath) Indian politician and actor from Karnataka
- Bhavya Gowda (born 1983), Indian model from Karnataka
- Ere Gowda, Indian Kannada film director from Karnataka
- Jaggesh (born 1963 as Eshwar Gowda), Indian Kannada actor from Karnataka
- K. C. N. Gowda (c. 1928–2012), Indian Kannada film producer and film distributor
- Pallavi Gowda (born 1993), Indian actress from Karnataka
- Ravishankar Gowda, Indian actor from Karnataka
- Sheela Gowda (born 1957), Indian artist from Karnataka
- Yash Gowda (born Naveen Kumar Gowda), Indian actor from Karnataka

=== Historical Figures and Rulers ===
- Kempe Gowda I (1510–1569), Founder of Bengaluru & feudatory ruler of the Vijayanagara Empire.

=== Law ===
- Venkate Gopala Gowda (born 1951), Indian Supreme court judge

=== Literature ===
- Javare Gowda (1915–2016), Indian Kannada author
- H. L. Nage Gowda (1915–2005), Indian Kannada folklorist and author
- Shilpi Somaya Gowda (born 1970), Canadian novelist

=== Politics ===
- H. D. Deve Gowda (born 1933), former Prime Minister of India
- Siddaramaiah (born 1947), Born as Siddaramegowda, Hon'ble Chief Minister Of Karnataka.
- H. D. Kumaraswamy (born 1959), former chief minister of Karnataka
- D. K. Shivakumar (born 1962), Deputy Chief Minister of Karnataka
- D. B. Chandre Gowda (born 1936), Indian politician from Karnataka
- D. V. Sadananda Gowda (born 1953), Indian politician from Karnataka
- K. Venkatagiri Gowda (born 1923), Indian Economist & politician from Karnataka
- Krishna Byre Gowda (born 1973), Indian politician from Karnataka
- M. J. Appaji Gowda (died 2020), Indian politician
- Maritibbe Gowda, Karnataka politician
- N. H. Gouda, (1938–1992), Indian politician from Karnataka
- Narayana Gowda, Indian politician from Karnataka
- Rajeev Gowda, Indian politician and academic from Karnataka
- Ramachandra Gowda, Indian politician from Karnataka
- Sadananda Gowda, Indian politician from Karnataka
- Shantaveri Gopala Gowda (1923–1972), Indian politician from Karnataka
- Tejashwini Gowda (born 1966), Indian politician from Karnataka
- C. N. Manjunath (born Manjunath Gowda) cardiologist turned politician. MP of Bangalore Rural Lok Sabha constituency.

=== Sports ===
- Girisha Nagarajegowda (born 1988), Indian Paralympic athlete known as Girish N. Gowda
- Vikas Gowda (born 1983), Indian athlete

=== Others ===
- K. Chidananda Gowda, Indian computer scientist
- Tulsi Gowda, Indian environmentalist

== See also ==
- Gouda (disambiguation)
- Vokkaliga
