= Jorge Oteiza =

Spanish sculptor and painter

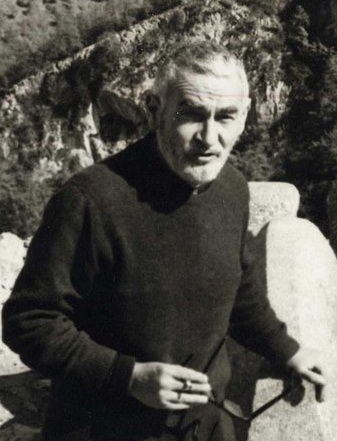
- Otieza in 1968
- Born: Jorge Oteiza Embil; 21 October 1908; Orio, Gipuzkoa, Spain
- Died: 9 April 2003 (aged 94); San Sebastián, Gipuzkoa, Spain
- Known for: Sculpture, architecture, and writing
- Movement: Equipo 57, Gaur, Land art
- Awards: Prince of Asturias Award for the Arts

Jorge Oteiza Enbil (21 October 1908 – 9 April 2003), was a Spanish sculptor, painter, designer and writer from the Basque Country, renowned for being one of the main theorists on Basque modern art. Oteiza was born in Orio (Gipuzkoa, Basque Autonomous Community, Spain). He moved to South America in 1935, just before the Spanish Civil War, and stayed there for 14 years. In 1963 he published Quosque tandem!, an essay about the aesthetics inherent to Basque soul, based on prehistoric art found in Basque regions and Basque people's anthropological roots. Three years on, he contributed to found the artistic group Gaur.

He died in San Sebastián, Gipuzkoa, in 2003. Following his will, a month after his death a museum dedicated to his career was opened in Altzuza, Navarre, in the place where he had lived since 1975. The Oteiza Museum is a monographic exhibition space housing the personal collection of Jorge Oteiza, which includes 1,690 sculptures, 2,000 experimental pieces from the artist's Chalk Laboratory, and an extensive collection of drawings and collages.

== Main prizes and awards ==
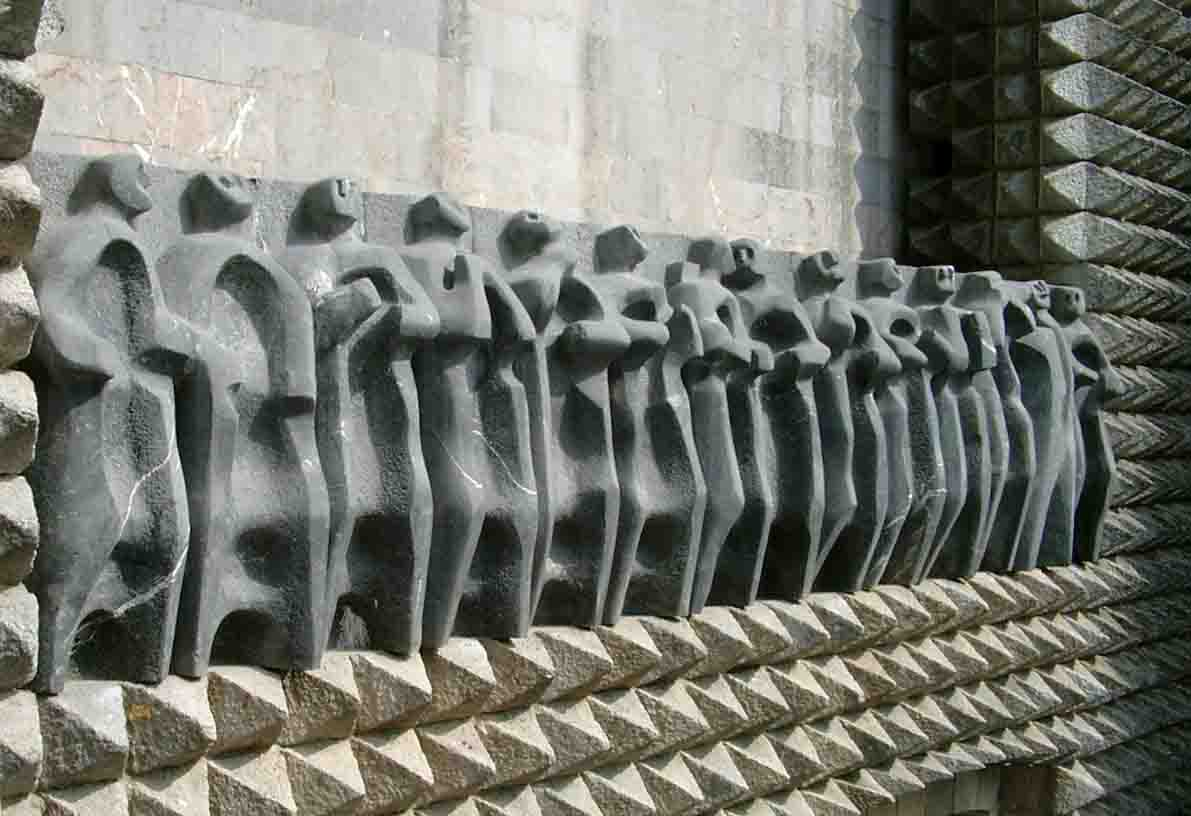
Oteiza Apostoluak (The apostles), sculptures on the Monastery of Arantzazu, hollowed out stone, 1950

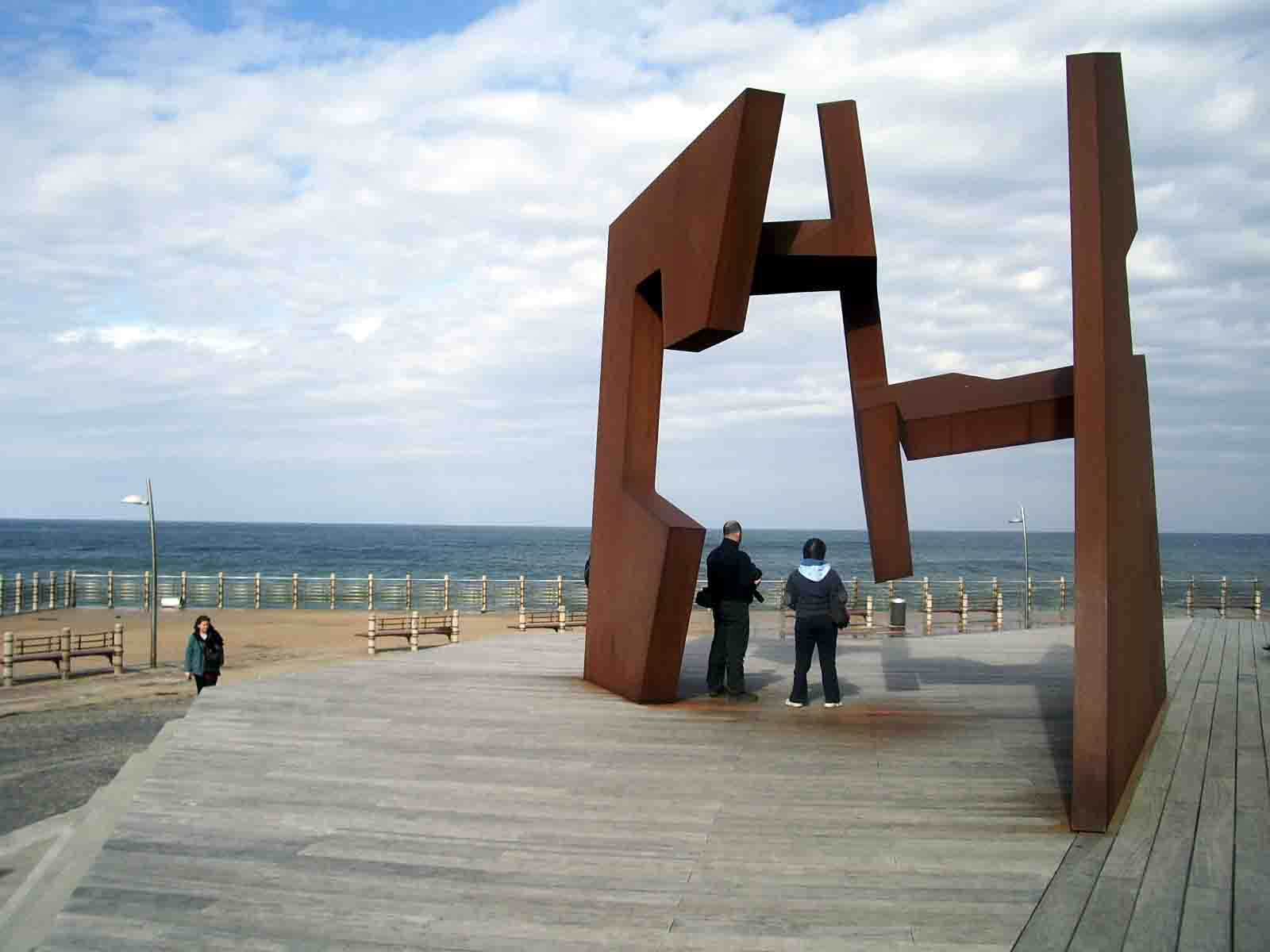
"Construcción vacía", ("Void Construction") San Sebastián, Basque country, Spain.

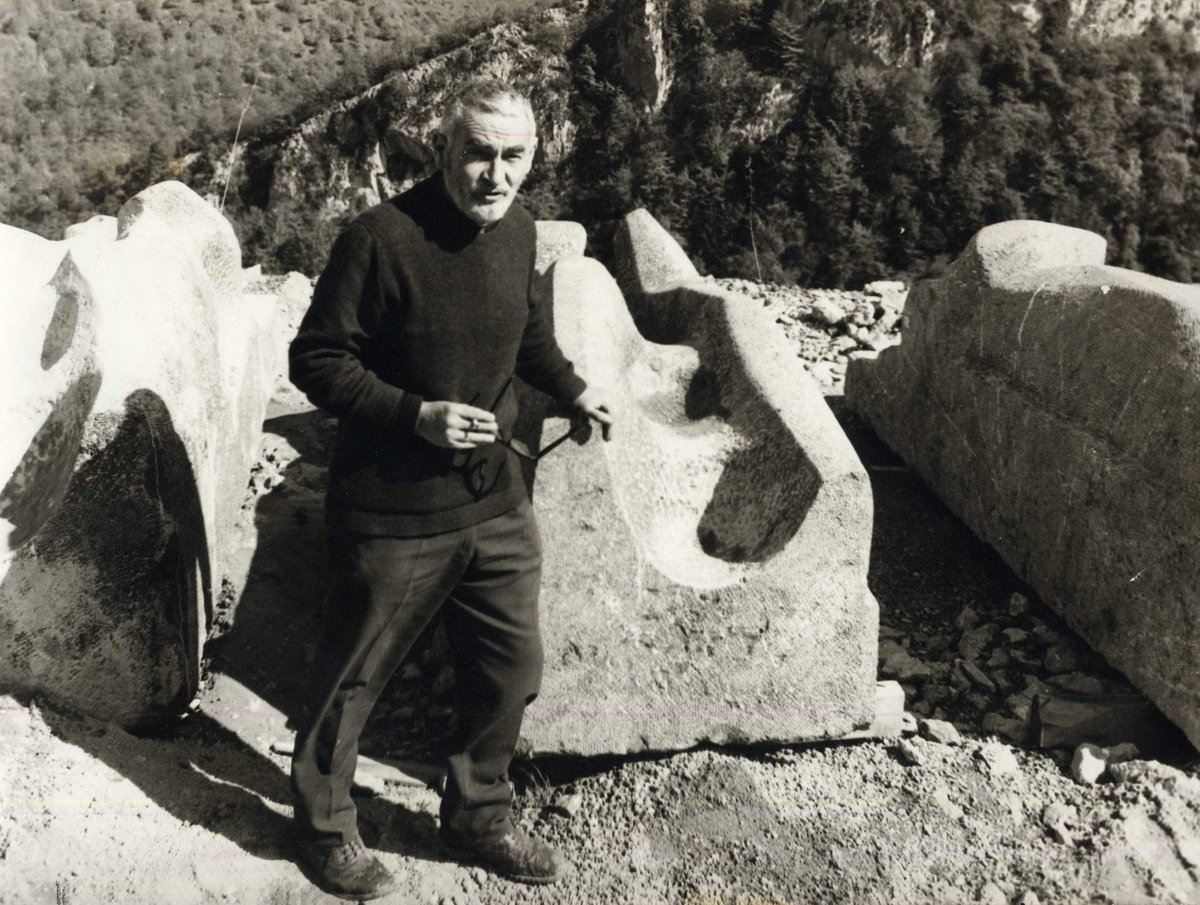
Oteiza posing with the apostles during their creation

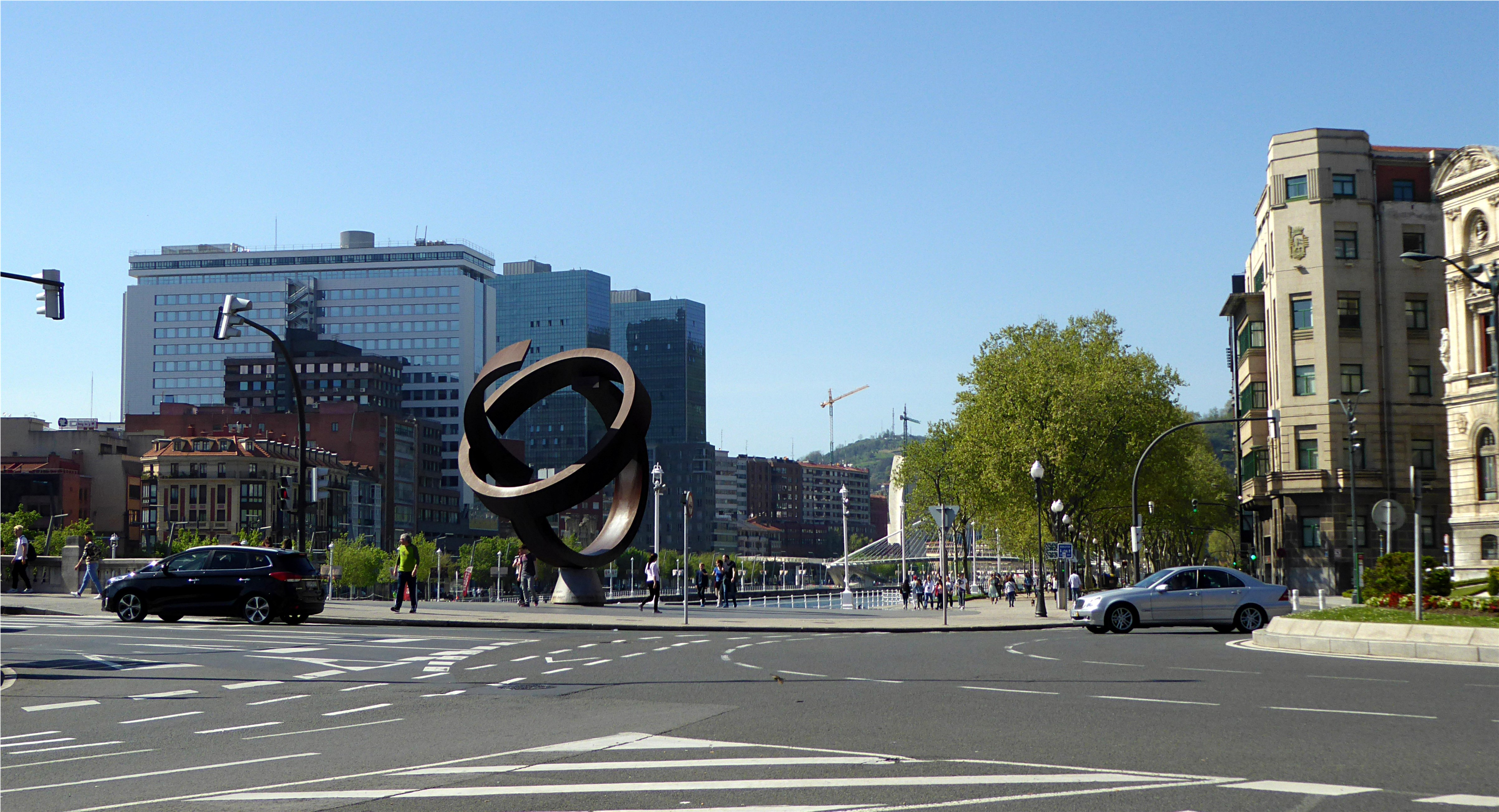
Variante ovoide de la desocupación de la esfera, in front of the Bilbao City Hall

Jorge Oteiza was granted several prizes and awards throughout his life:

- 1953 — Only Spanish sculptor selected for the international competition for the Monument to the Unknown Political Prisoner. The project is exhibited in the Tate Gallery (London).
- 1954 — Spanish National Award of Architecture, for a project to do a chapel on the Road to Santiago. It was a joint project, together with architects F. J. Sáenz de Oiza and Luis Romaní, and it was not carried out.
- 1957 — Grand Prix for his sculpture at the IV São Paulo Art Biennial (Brazil).
- 1970 — First Prize in the competition for the urban planning of the Plaza de Colón in Madrid. It was a joint project, together with Angel Orbe, Mario Gaviria and Luis Arana, and it was not carried out.
- 1985 — Gold Medal for Fine Arts, awarded by the Spanish Ministry of Culture.
- 1986 — Selected for the exhibition Qu’est-ce que la sculpture moderne? 1900-1970, held in the Museum of Modern Art at the Georges Pompidou Center in Paris.
- 1988 — Prince of Asturias Prize for the Arts.
- 1991 — Gold Medal of Navarre, awarded by the Government of Navarre.
- 1995 — Manuel Lekuona prize by Eusko Ikaskuntza (Society of Basque Studies).
- 1996 — Pevsner Prize (Paris), in recognition of his life's work.
- 1996 — Honorary member of the Vascon-Navarrese Architect's Association.
- 1998 — Doctor honoris causa by the University of the Basque Country.
- 1998 — Madrid Fine Arts Circle Medal.
- 1998 — Gipuzkoa Gold medal.

== Personal life ==
His brother Antonio Oteiza was a fellow sculptor.
