= Gory =

Góry (meaning "mountains" in Slavic languages) may refer to the following:

== Places ==
=== Poland ===
==== Greater Poland Voivodeship ====
- Góry, Konin County
- Góry, Słupca County

==== Łódź Voivodeship ====
- Góry, Poddębice County
- Góry, Wieruszów County

==== Lublin Voivodeship ====
- Góry, Krasnystaw County
- Góry, Puławy County
- Góry, Gmina Urzędów
- Góry, Gmina Zakrzówek

==== Masovian Voivodeship ====
- Góry, Białobrzegi County
- Góry, Mińsk County
- Góry, Siedlce County
- Góry, Ostrołęka County

==== Warmian-Masurian Voivodeship ====
- Góry, Braniewo County
- Góry, Węgorzewo County

==== Other voivodeships ====
- Góry, Kuyavian-Pomeranian Voivodeship, north-central Poland
- Góry, Lower Silesian Voivodeship, south-west Poland
- Góry, Podlaskie Voivodeship, north-east Poland
- Góry, Świętokrzyskie Voivodeship, south-central Poland
- Góry, West Pomeranian Voivodeship, north-west Poland

=== Other places ===
- Gory, Mali, Kayes Region, western Mali

== People ==
- Gory Guerrero (1921–1990), an American professional wrestler
- Hippolyte Louis Gory (1800-1852), a French entomologist

== See also ==
- Gore (disambiguation)
- Gorey (disambiguation)
- Gori (disambiguation)
- Gory Gory Hallelujah, a 2003 American film directed by Sue Corcoran
- Jouri, an Arabic female name
