= Netta (village) =

Group of villages in Poland

Netta [ˈnɛtta] (Lithuanian: Mėta) is a group of villages in Gmina Augustów in north-eastern Poland, close to the Netta river. It is divided into:

- Netta Pierwsza (Netta I)
- Netta Druga (Netta II)
- Netta-Folwark
