= Augustów =

- Town
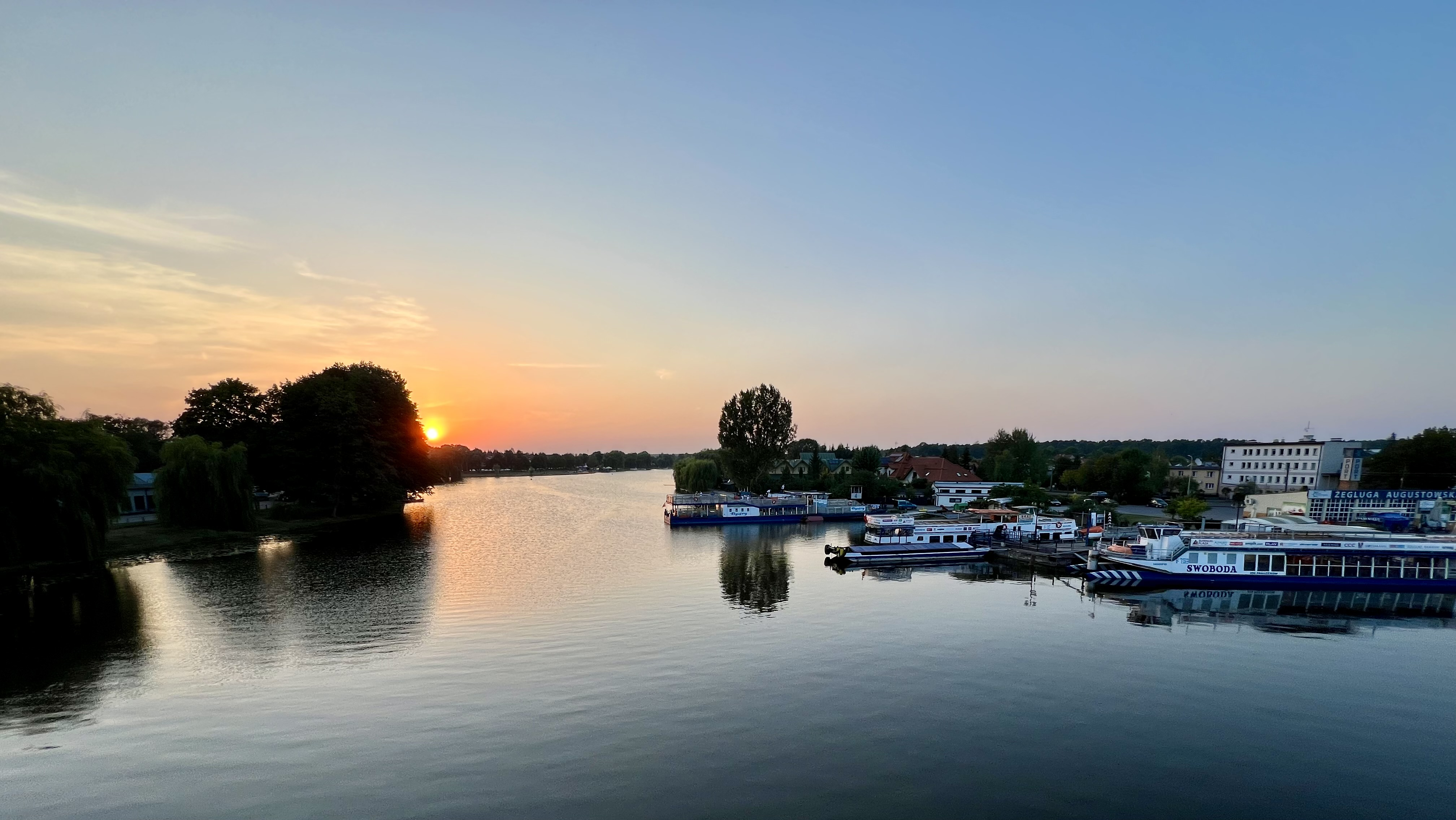
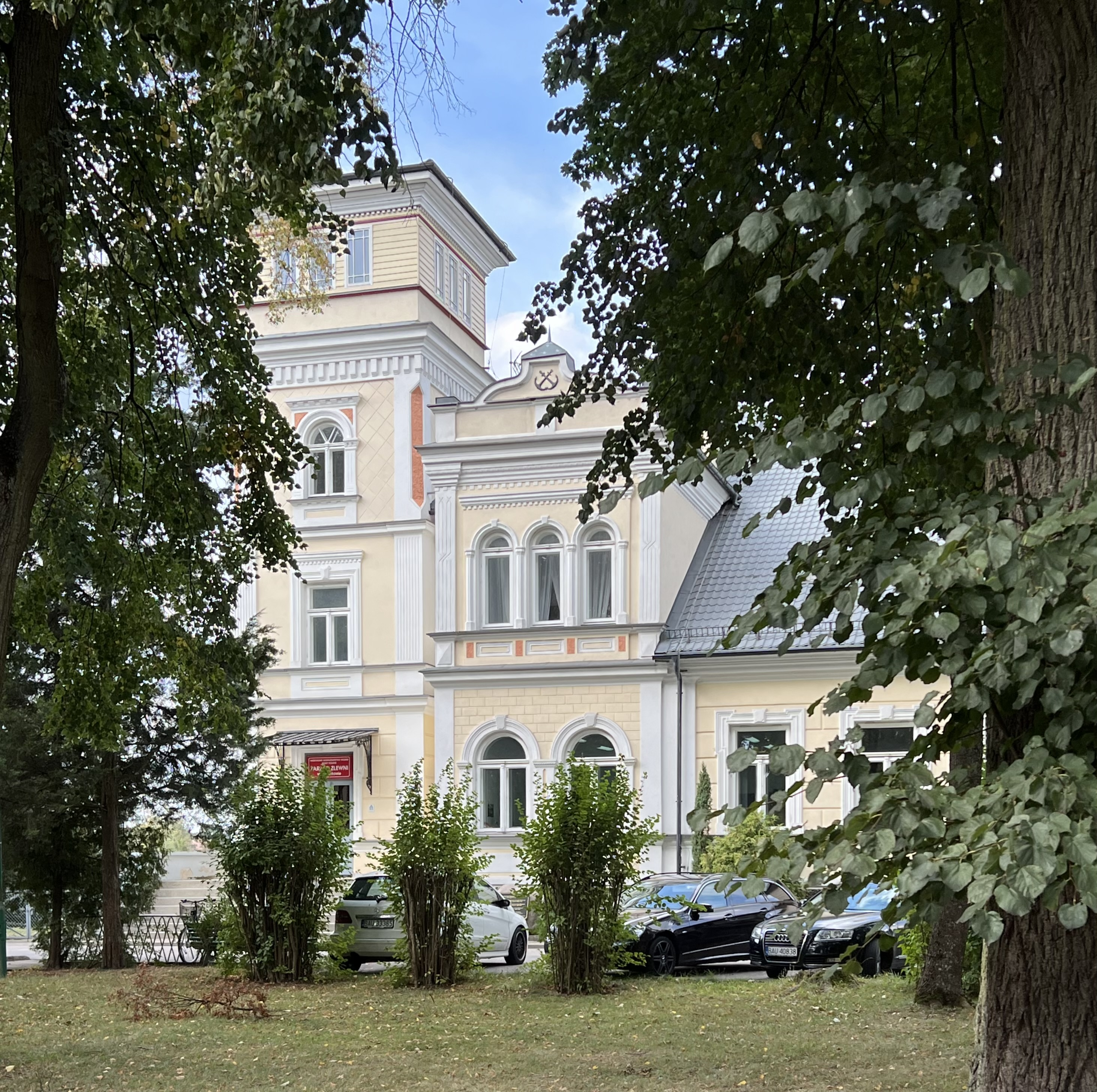
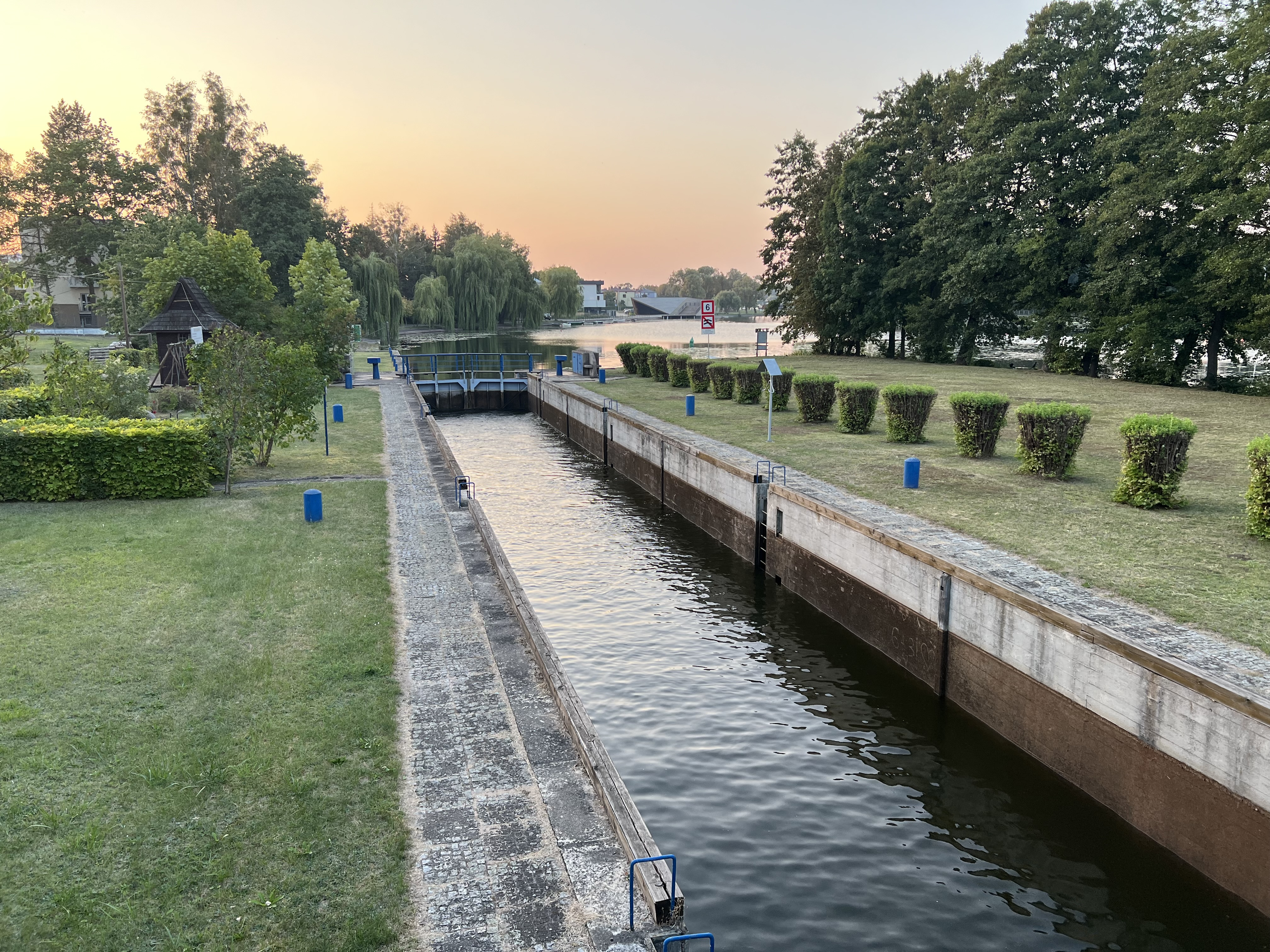
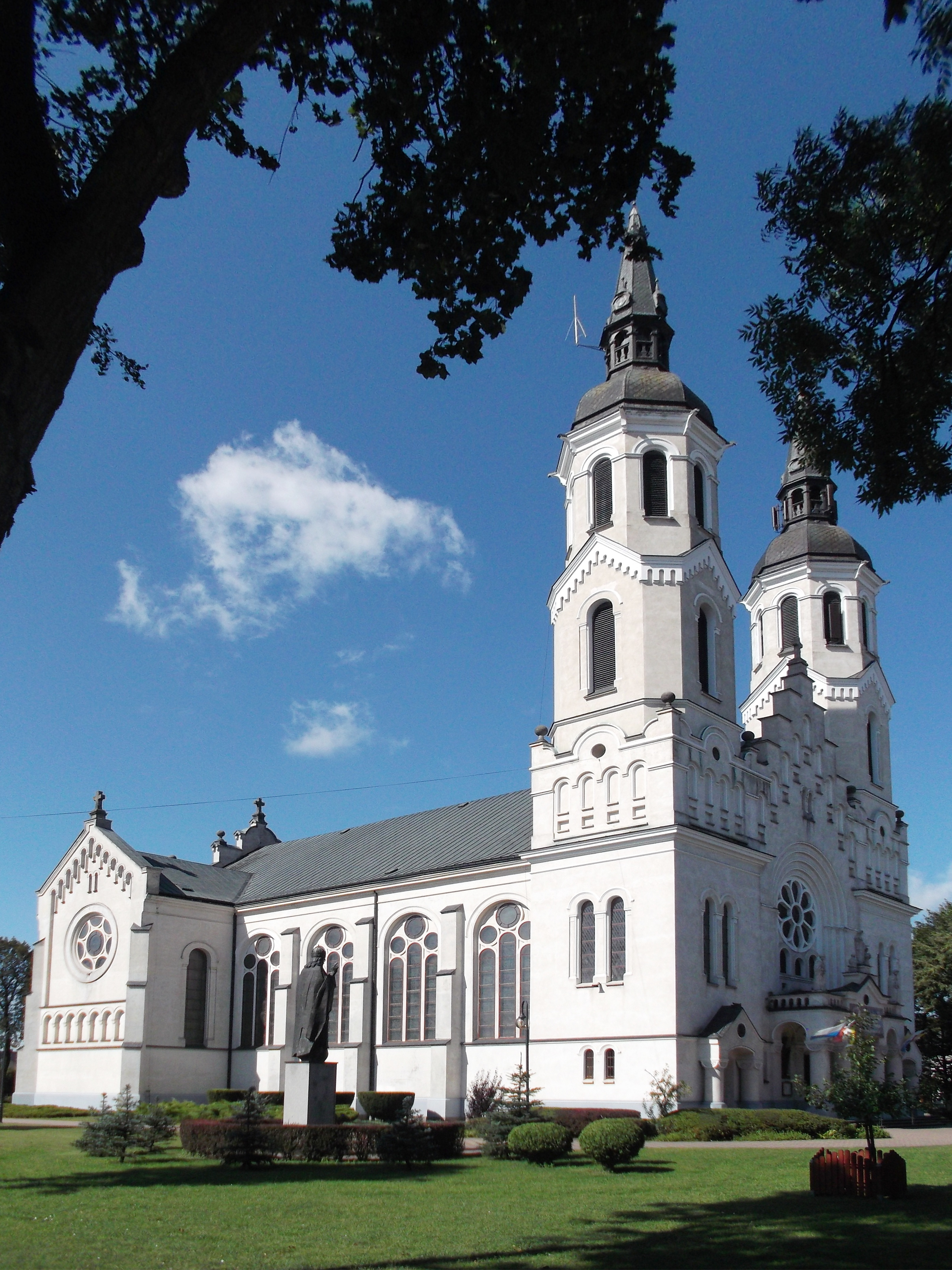
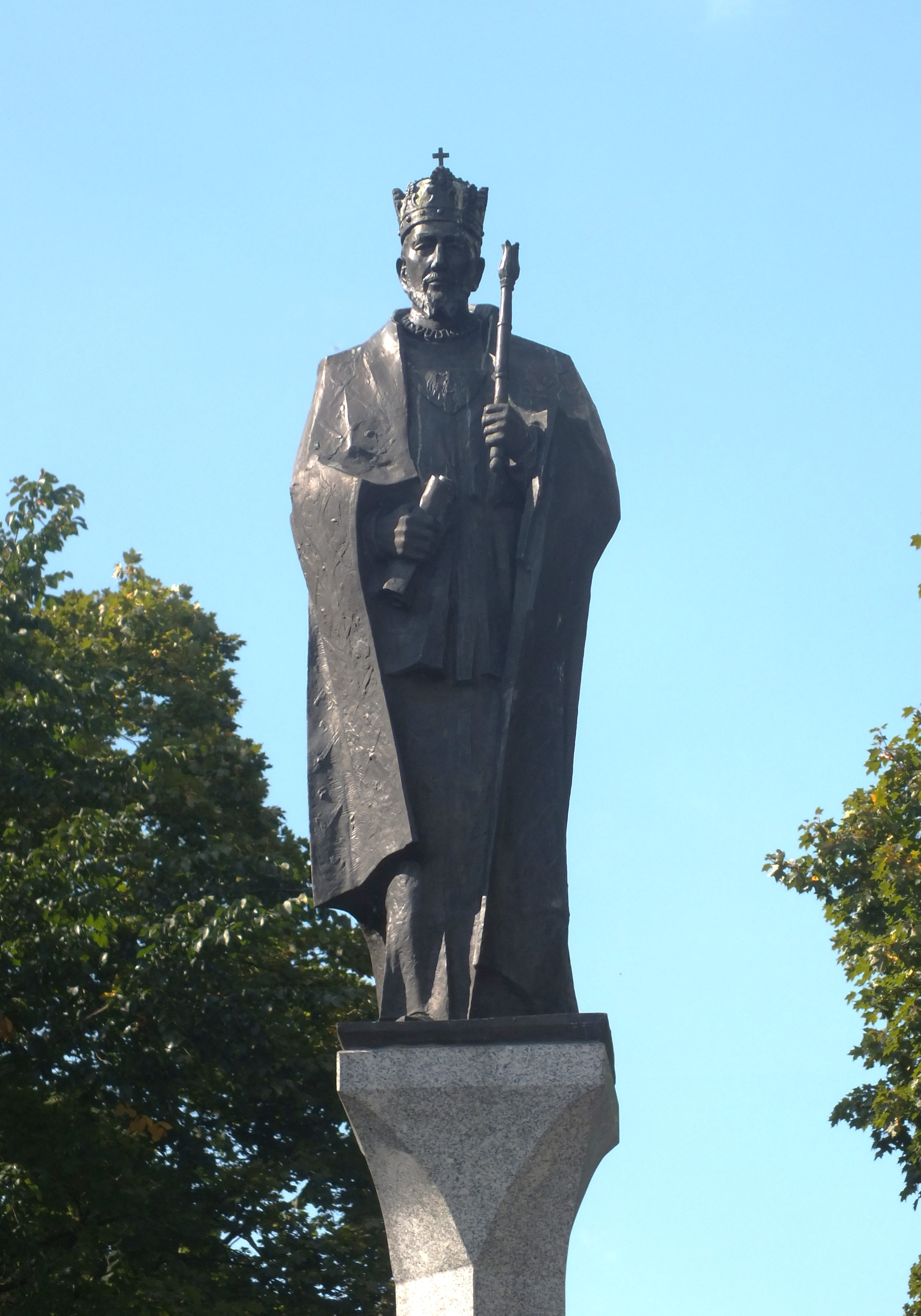
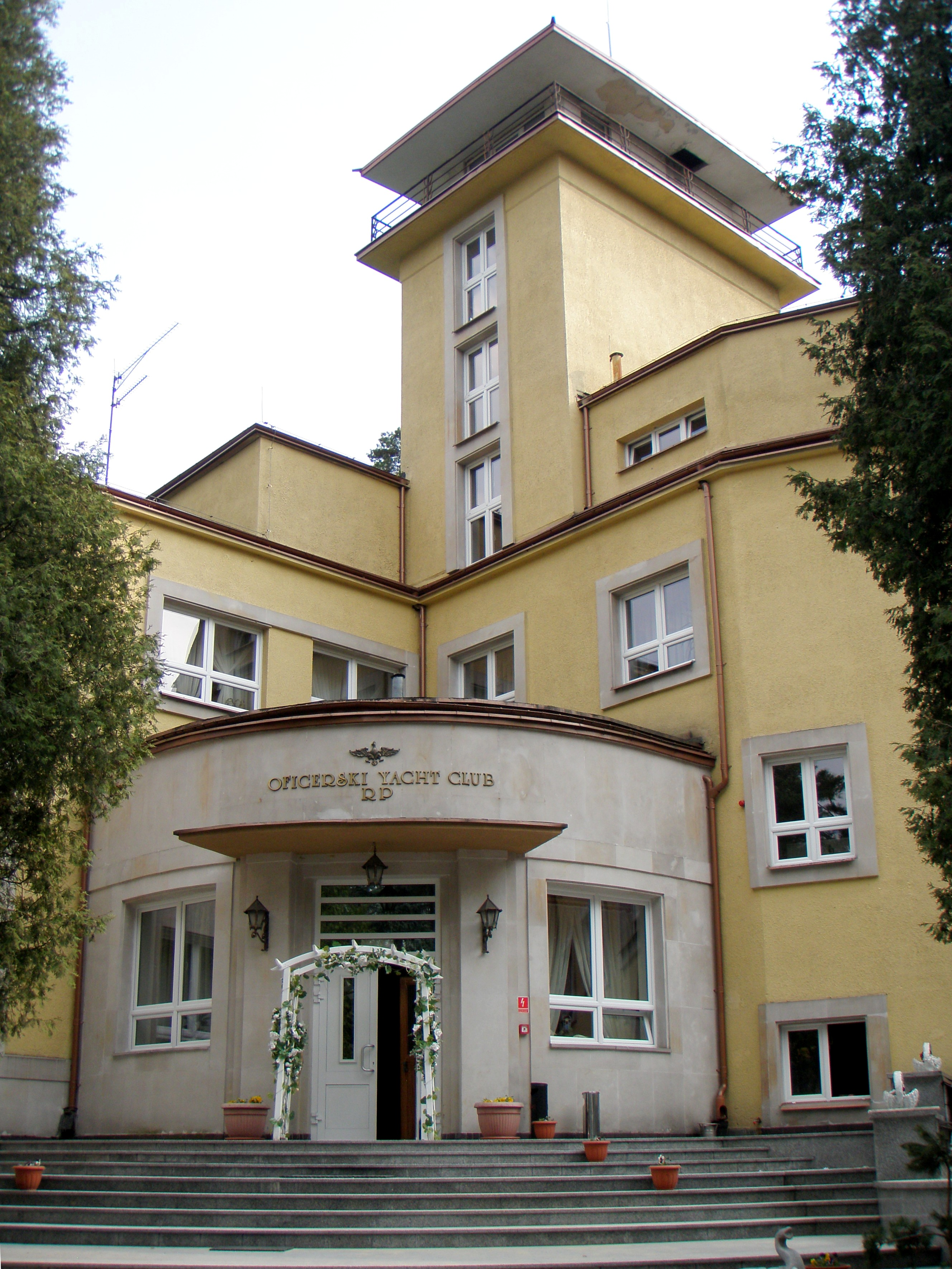
- Netta River Water Authority Augustów Canal Sacred Heart Basilica Sigismund II Monument Officer Yacht Club

- Coat of arms

- Location within Poland Location within Podlaskie Voivodeship
- Coordinates: 53°50′37″N 22°58′46″E
- Country: Poland
- Voivodeship: Podlaskie
- County: Augustów County
- Gmina: Augustów (urban gmina)
- First mentioned: 1496
- Established: 1546
- Town rights: 1557
- Named after: Sigismund II Augustus

Government
  - Mayor: Mirosław Karolczuk

Area
  - Total: 80.90 km^{2} (31.24 sq mi)

Population (30 June 2022)
  - Total: 29,305
  - Density: 362/km^{2} (940/sq mi)
- Time zone: UTC+1 (CET)
  - Summer (DST): UTC+2 (CEST)
- Postal codes: 16-300 to 16-303
- Area code: +48 87
- Number plates: BAU
- Website: http://urzad.augustow.pl/

Augustów (Note: Polish: [au̯ˈɡustuf] (formerly known in English as Augustovo or Augustowo; Lithuanian: Augustavas; Yiddish: אױגוסטאװע, romanized: Ogustove) is a town in north-eastern Poland. It lies on the Netta River and the Augustów Canal. It is the seat of Augustów County and of Gmina Augustów in the Podlaskie Voivodeship. Augustów has an area of 80.90 square kilometres (31.24 square miles), and as of June 2022 it has a population of 29,305.

Situated on the Netta River and six lakes Augustów is a popular summer resort town and an officially recognized spa town in Poland. Founded in the 16th century and named after King Sigismund II Augustus, Augustów is a former royal town and garrison town of Poland, and contains a preserved historic urban layout with a large market square. Its landmarks include the Augustów Canal, an important engineering monument, listed as a Historic Monument of Poland, the Sanctuary of Our Lady of Studzieniczna, a popular regional Christian pilgrimage destination, and several museums.

== History ==
=== Early modern period ===
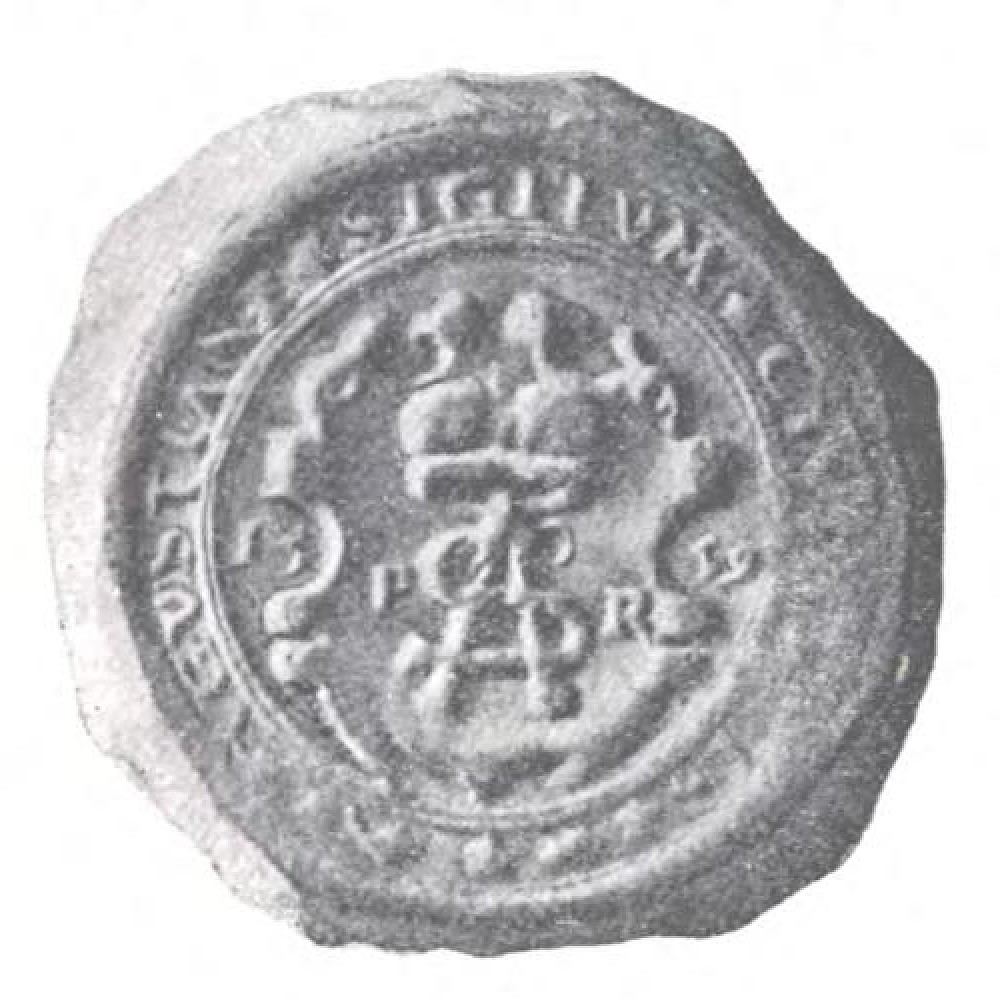
16th-century seal of Augustów

A settlement in the area was first mentioned in 1496. Augustów was established around 1540 by Bona Sforza and granted Magdeburg rights in 1557 by Sigismund II Augustus, after whom it was also named. It was laid out in a very regular manner, with a spacious market-place. In 1564, Sigismund II Augustus granted Augustów the adjacent settlements of Biernatki, Żarnowo and Turów, which became new suburbs.

Until 1569 Augustów belonged to the Grand Duchy of Lithuania within the Polish–Lithuanian union. In 1569, along with Podlachia, it was returned to the Kingdom of Poland by the Privilege of restoration of Podlasie land to the Polish Crown, while its cemetery was left in the Grand Duchy, both within the Polish–Lithuanian Commonwealth as a result of the Union of Lublin. Augustów was a royal town, located in the Podlaskie Voivodeship in the Lesser Poland Province. Fishing, brewing, tavern keeping and trade were the main occupations of the inhabitants. Tatar invaders destroyed Augustów in 1656, and the second half of the 17th century saw the town afflicted by plague. The Crown's 4th National Cavalry Brigade was stationed in Augustów in 1790.

=== Late modern period ===
In 1795 Prussia annexed Augustów in the Third Partition of Poland. In 1807, it became part of the Polish Duchy of Warsaw, followed by incorporation into the Russian-controlled Kingdom of Poland in 1815.

Augustów was designated the capital of the newly established Augustów Voivodeship, although, due to a lack of sufficient office space, the capital was established in Łomża, and then moved to Suwałki. A few years later, as part of plans to make Augustów the provincial capital, a project was drawn up for a major expansion of the town, with a new urban layout adjacent to the old town, the centre of which was to be the Nowy Rynek (New Market Square) with administrative buildings. The final design was drawn up in 1830 by Henryk Marconi, one of the leading Polish architects of the early 19th century. The plan to move the provincial capital to Augustów was abandoned following the outbreak and fall of the November Uprising.

It was made a county seat in 1842. The local populace took part in the large Polish January Uprising of 1863–1864 against Russia. With a population around 9,400 (c. 1875), it carried a large trade in cattle and horses, and manufactured linen and huckaback. Its canal connects the Vistula and Neman rivers and the railway reached the town in 1899, when its population was around 12,800.

During World War I, the Russian Army successfully counterattacked the German Army in the Battle of Augustów, in the lead-up to the better-known Battle of the Vistula River.

In the aftermath of World War I, it was a site of fighting during the Battle of Augustów in 1920. Augustów was once again briefly ruled by Lithuania on August 8–28, 1920, for the first time since the 16th century. It was eventually restored to Poland, and formed part of the Białystok Voivodeship.

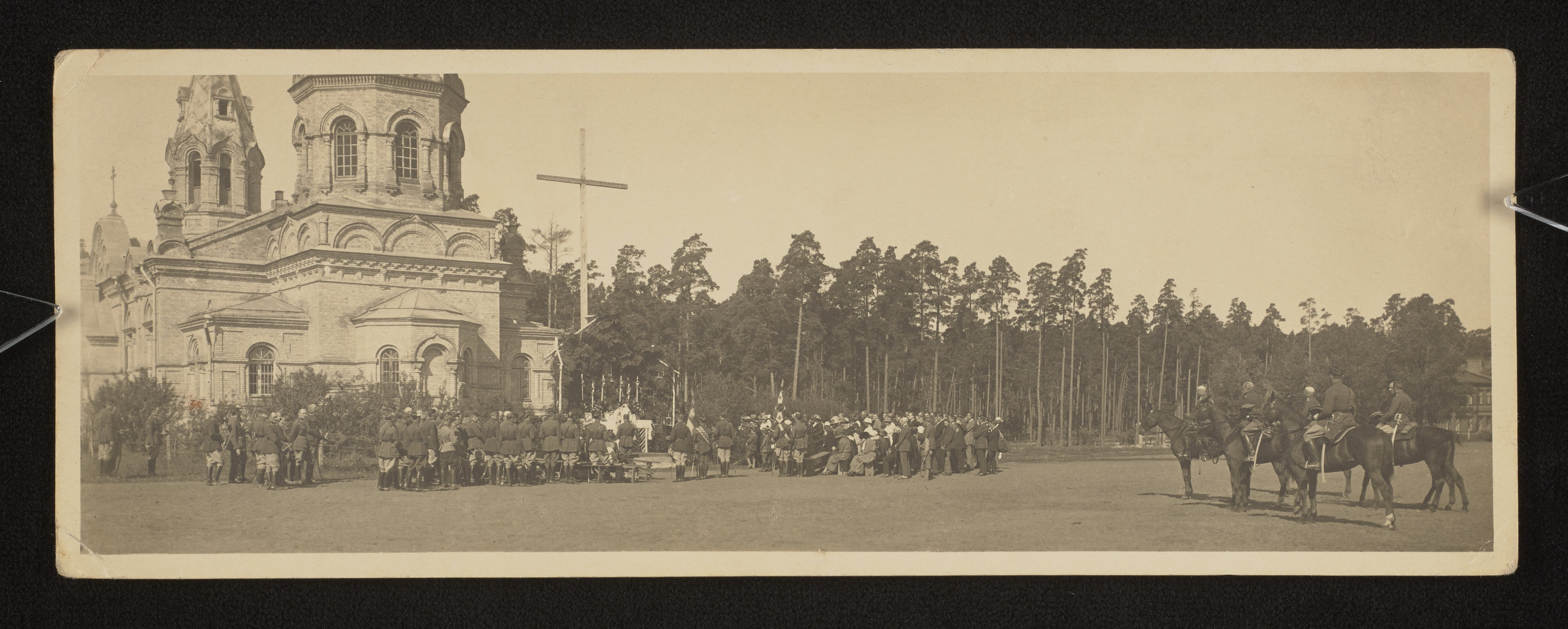
1st Krechowce Uhlan Regiment in 1922

In 1921, the Polish 1st Krechowce Uhlan Regiment, which previously fought in the First World War and the Polish–Soviet War, was relocated from Hrubieszów to Augustów. In 1921, Marshal Józef Piłsudski conducted an inspection at the garrison in Augustów. The 1st Krechowce Uhlan Regiment was considered elite and enjoyed outstanding renown in Poland. In 1925, the 10th anniversary of the regiment was celebrated in Augustów with the participation of the then Minister of Military Affairs, Władysław Sikorski, who later became Prime Minister of Poland in exile during World War II. Augustów was visited by Presidents of Poland Stanisław Wojciechowski (in 1923) and Ignacy Mościcki (in 1929 and 1932).

=== World War II ===
Following the joint German-Soviet invasion of Poland, which started World War II in September 1939, Augustów was occupied by the Soviet Union until 1941. Many inhabitants were sent to exile in Kazakhstan, from where some were able to return after 6 years. Around a dozen Poles who were either born or lived and worked in Augustów were murdered by the Russians in the Katyn massacre in 1940.

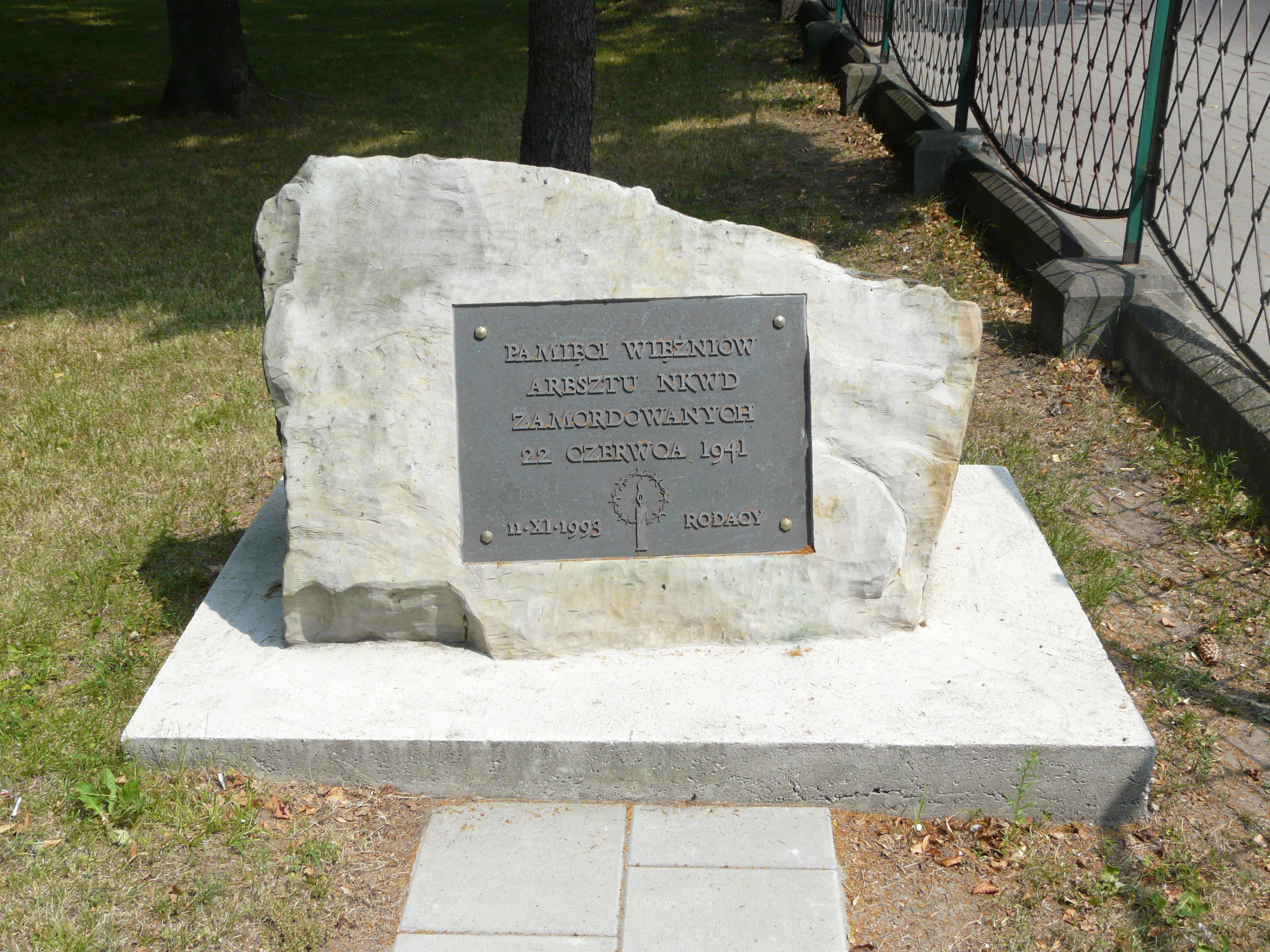
Memorial to victims of the 1941 NKVD prisoner massacre

On June 22, 1941, just before the Germans captured the town, the Soviets murdered around 30–34 Polish prisoners in Augustów as part of the NKVD prisoner massacres. The Nazi German forces occupied Augustów until 1944, and operated a forced labour camp in the town.

World War II brought the destruction of about 70% of the town and death or departure of most of its residents, amongst them a community of several thousand Jews who were imprisoned in the ghetto situated between the canal and the river. The Germans executed practically all of them before they left.

=== Post-war period ===
In July 1945, the Soviets conducted the nearby Augustów roundup – a special operation against former Armia Krajowa anticommunist fighters. They are presumed to have been executed and buried in an unknown location in present-day Russia or Belarus. Polish Institute of National Remembrance has declared the 1945 Augustów roundup "the largest crime committed by the Soviets on Polish lands after World War II".

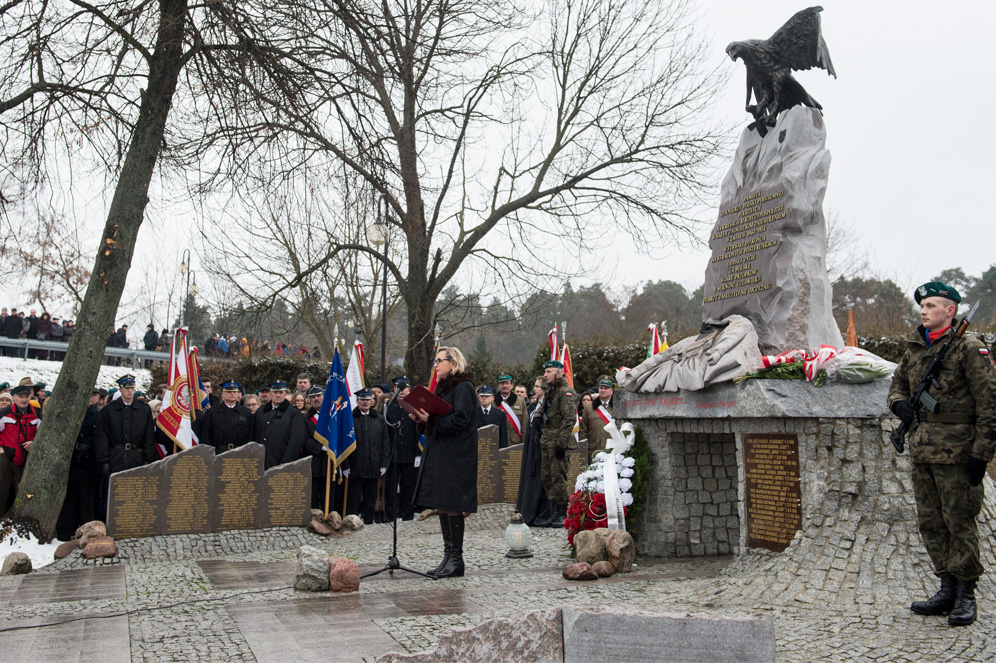
National Day of Remembrance for the "Cursed Soldiers" in Augustów in 2016

After the war, the recreational base of the city was further expanded. In 1946, the city had 7.2 thousand inhabitants. In 1954, several rural settlements were excluded from the city area, but in 1973, the city expanded to include several villages, forests and six lakes. In the years 1975–1998, the city was located in the Suwałki Voivodeship.

In 1999, the city became part of newly created Podlaskie Voivodeship, and the seat of the Augustów district and the Augustów urban gmina.

== Demographics ==
2002 – 29,705 inhabitants, by nationality:

- Poles – 96.5% (28,668);
- Russians – 0.2% (64);
- Roma people – 0.1% (41);
- Other – 3.1% (932).

1921 – 8,762 inhabitants, by nationality:

- Poles – 76.6% (6,715);
- Jews – 22.4% (1,962);
- Russians – 0.6% (51);
- Belarusians – 0.1% (8);
- Germans – 0.1% (6);
- Other – 0.2% (20).

1897 – 12,743 inhabitants, by language:

- Polish – 46.2% (5,882);
- Jewish – 28.5% (3,630);
- Russian – 18.7% (2,381);
- Belarusian – 2.8% (357);
- Mari – 1.2% (156);
- German – 1.0% (131);
- Tatar – 0.9% (117);
- Lithuanian – 0.2% (20);
- Other – 0.5% (69).

== Transport ==
=== Rail transport ===
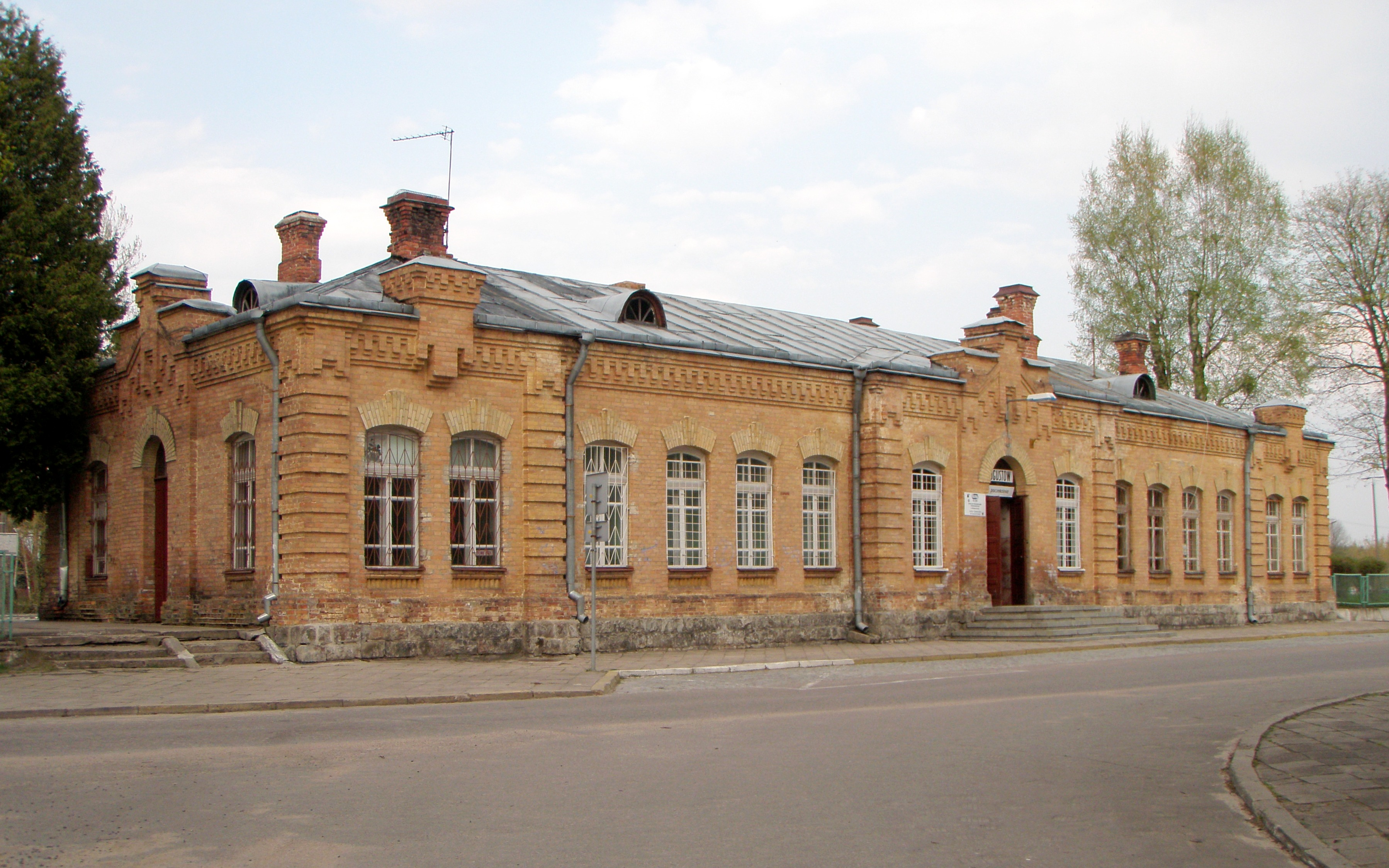
Railway station

Railway line 40 (Sokółka–Suwałki) passes through the town. Augustów has a railway station.

=== Road transport ===
National roads 8 (Kudowa-Zdrój–Budzisko), 16 (Dolna Grupa–Ogrodniki and 61 (Warsaw–Augustów), as well as voivodeship roads 664 (Augustów–Lipszczany) and 672 (Augustów–Suwałki) pass through the town.

Augustów ring road controversy

The construction of the Augustów bypass called Via Baltica, through the wetlands of the Rospuda Valley, attracted great controversy in 2007. The work was halted after the European Commission applied for an immediate injunction.

== Tourism ==
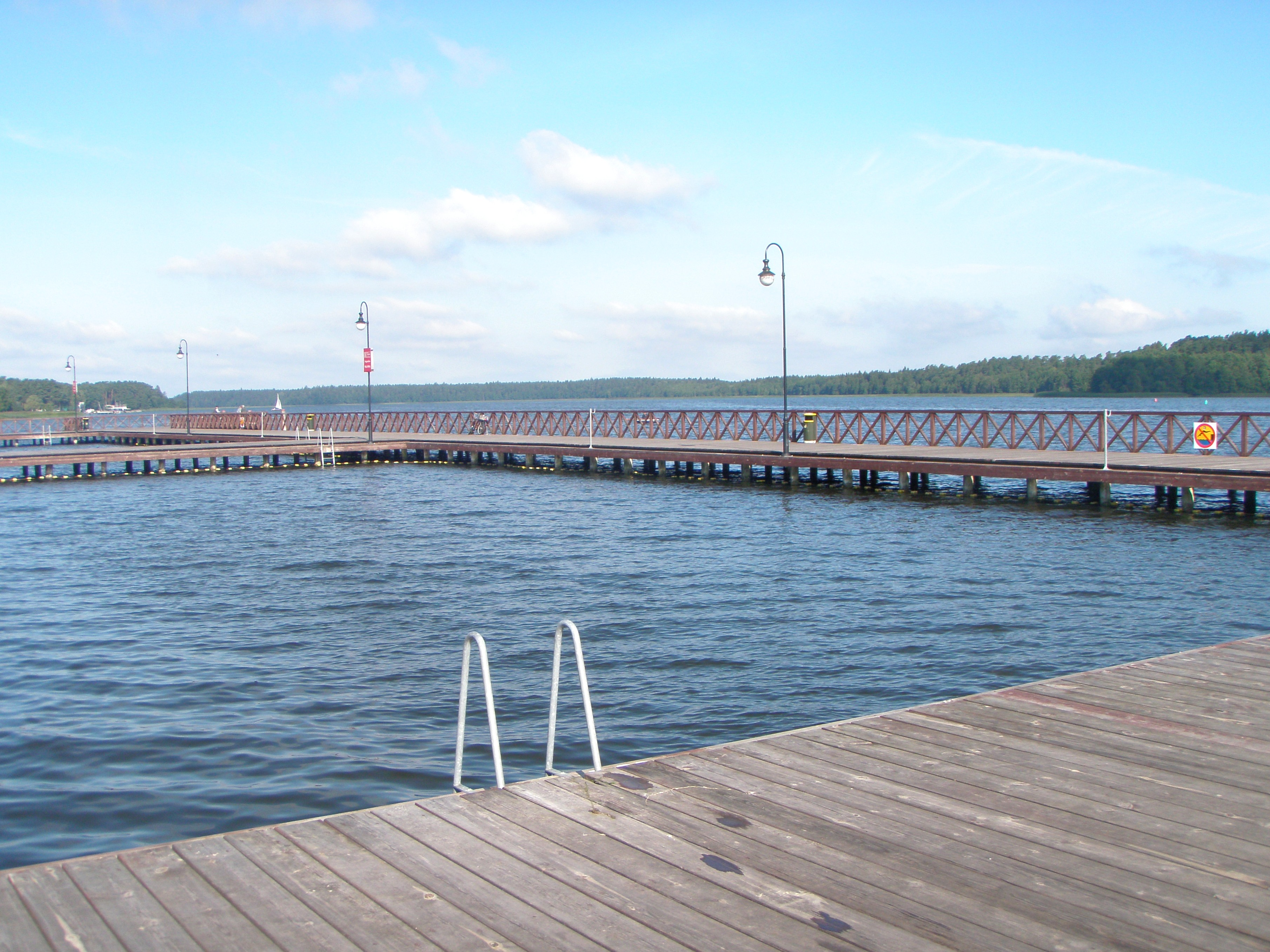
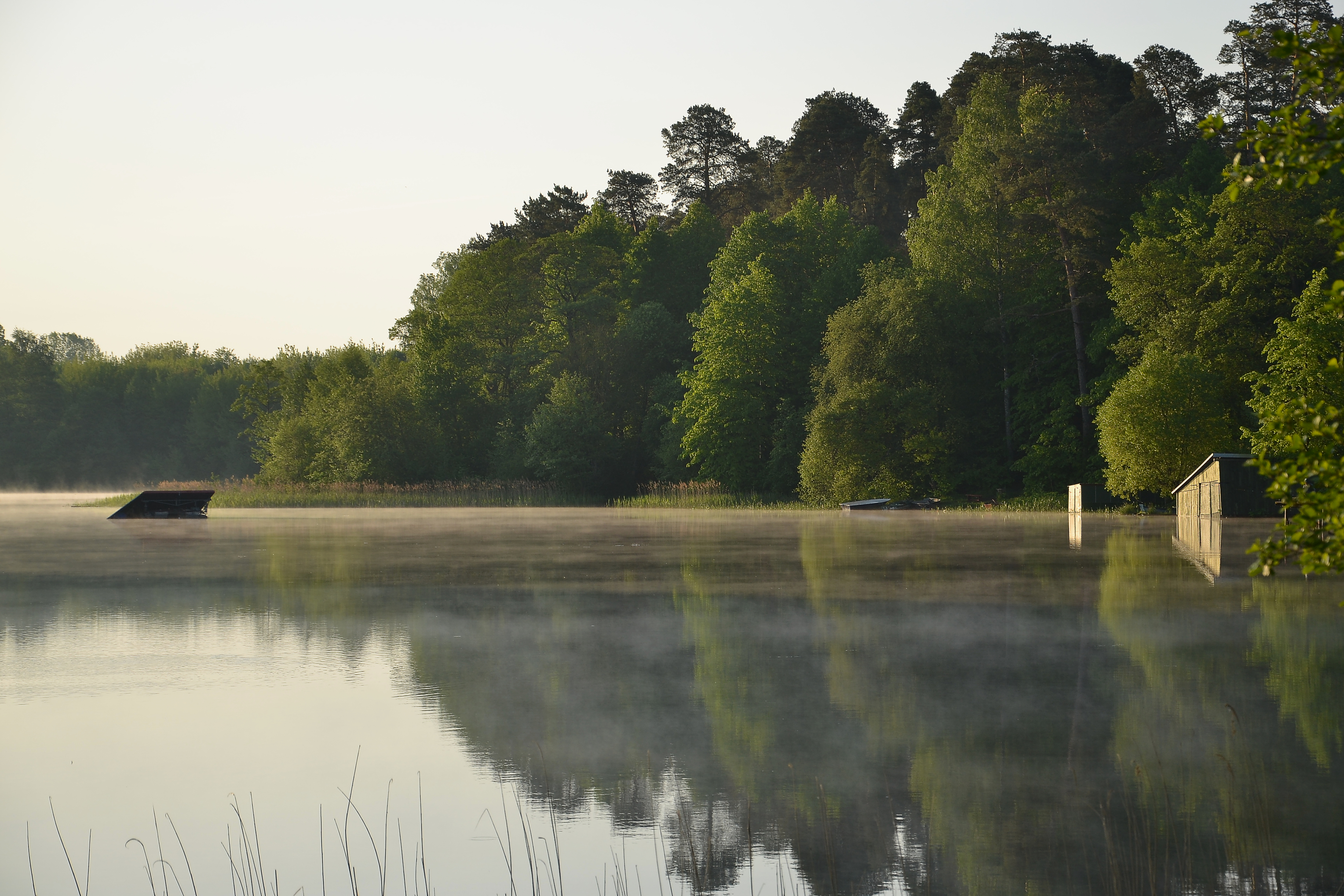
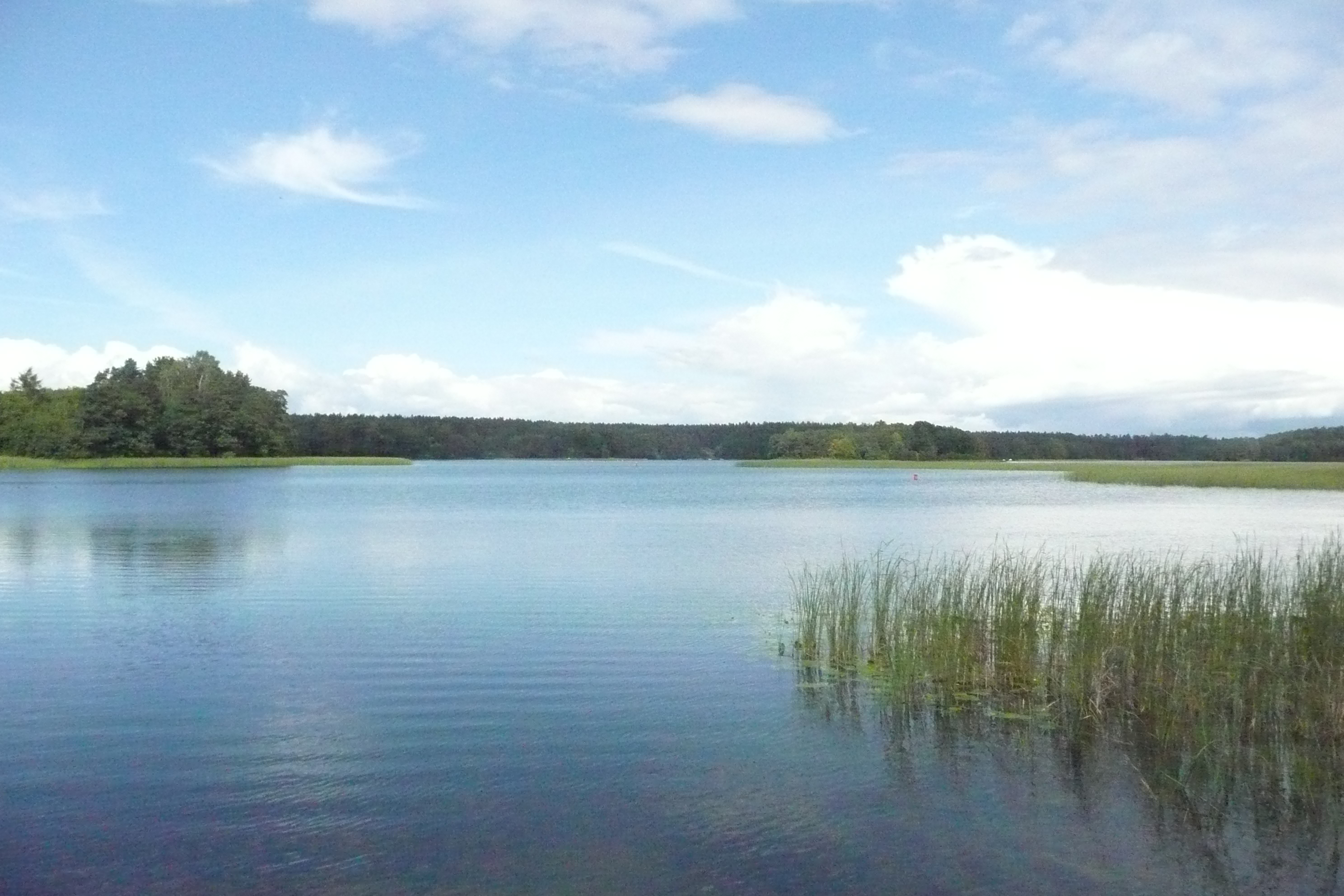
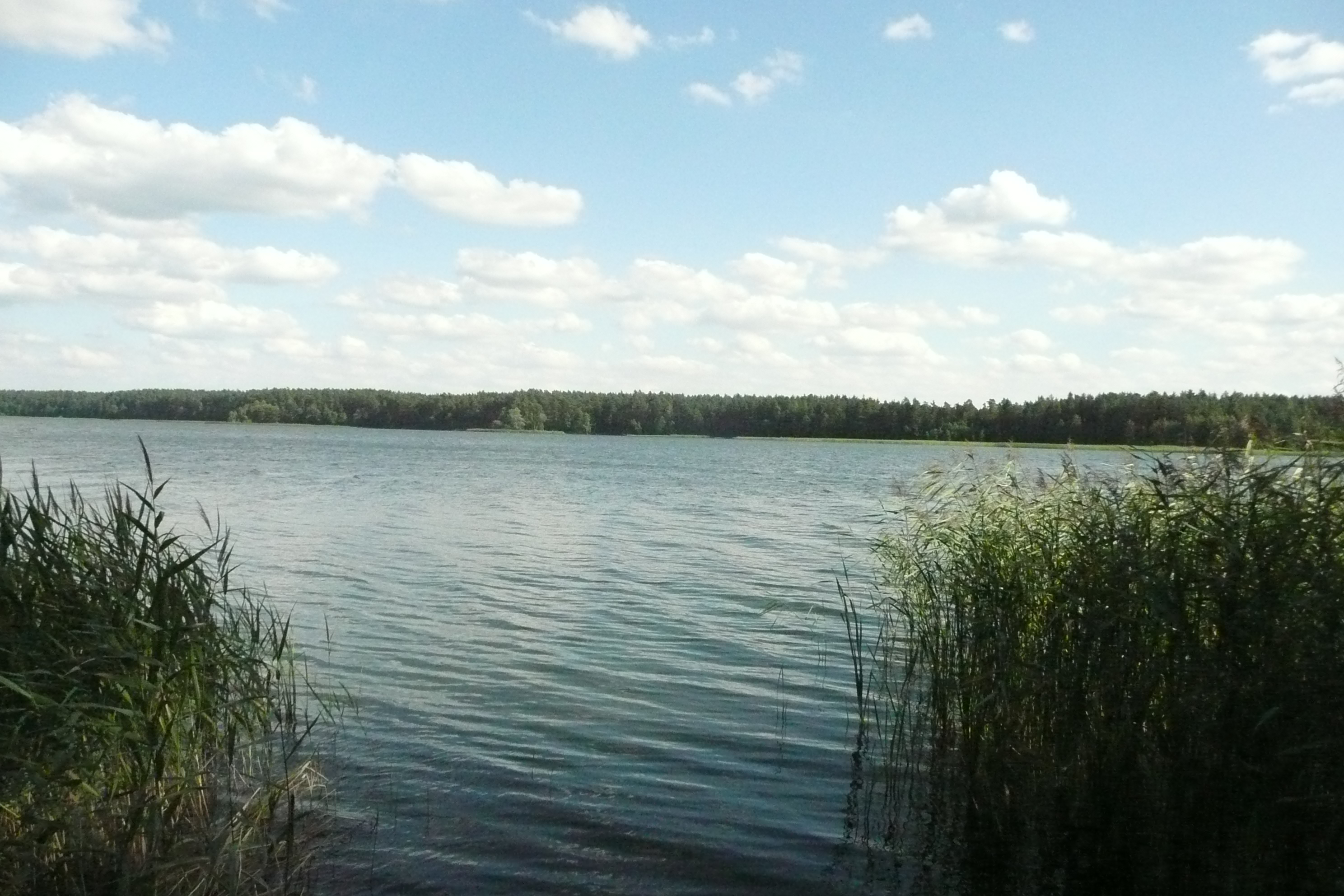
Largest lakes of Augustów: Necko, Białe Augustowskie, Studzieniczne, Sajno

The town, although small, has many attractions for the visitors. Oficerski Yacht Club Hotel, built in the 1930s, is an army yacht club that has been restored and converted into a resort. It is located on the edge of one of many lakes in the region. Pope John Paul II has a memorial chair from the first and last time he visited the town right outside the club. Boat tours are also popular and the old town square still has its original cobblestone streets.

Every year hundreds of bikers come to Augustowskie Motonoce bikers festival. Bands that over years participated in celebration include Bright Ophidia, AGE, ZZ Top Czech Revival Band, AC/DC Show Ukraina, Kraków Street Band, etc.

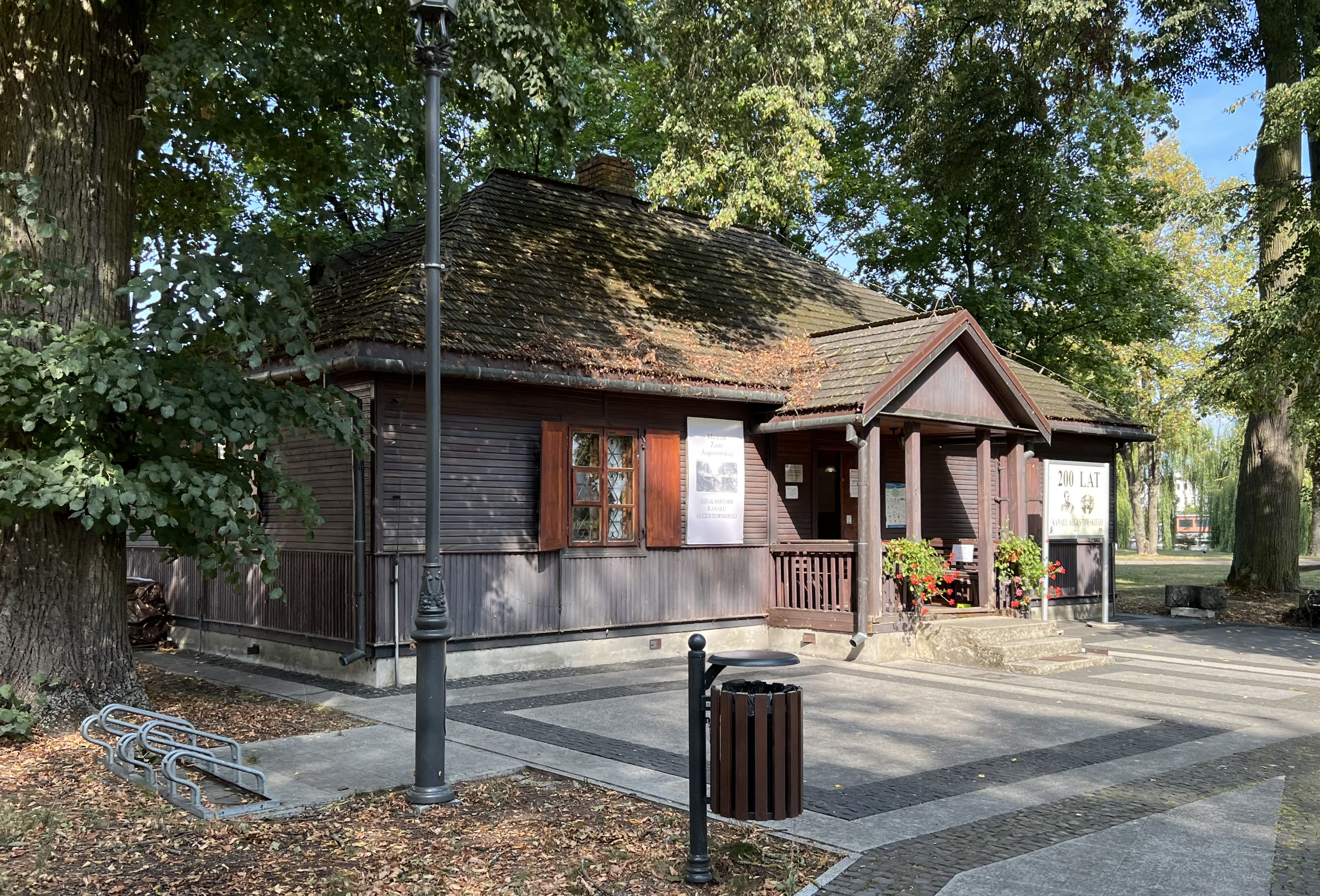
Augustów Canal History Department

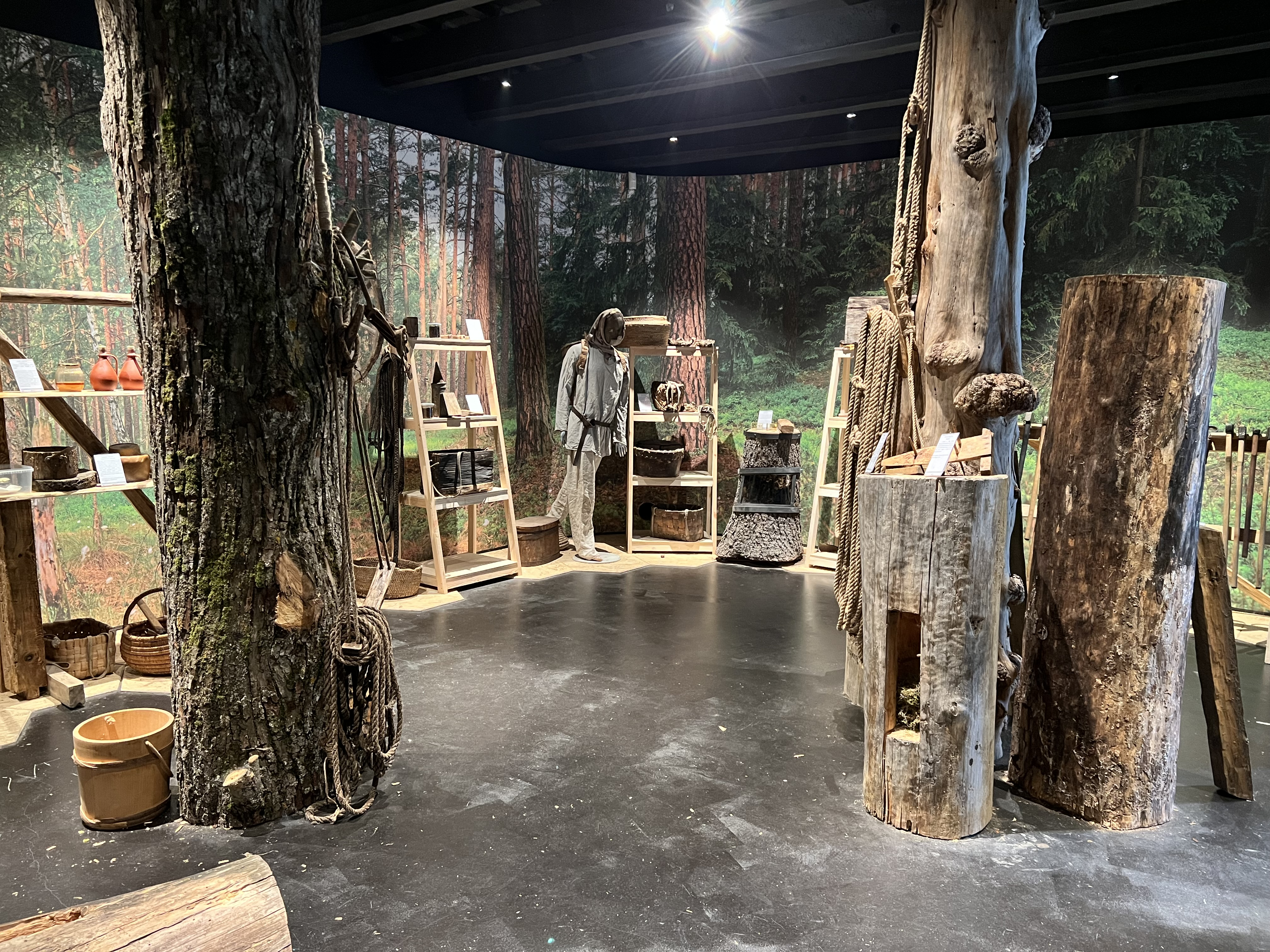
Museum of Beekeeping Culture

Augustów has several museums:

- Museum of Augustów Land (Muzeum Ziemi Augustowskiej) with the Ethnographic Department and the Augustów Canal History Department, which contains historical, military, ethnographic, numismatic and other collections.
- Museum of the 1st Krechowce Uhlan Regiment (Muzeum 1 Pułku Ułanów Krechowieckich), a former unit of the Polish Army, which was stationed in Augustów before World War II.
- Augustów Roundup Memorial House (Dom Pamięci Obławy Augustowskiej)
- Museum of Beekeeping Culture (Muzeum Kultury Bartniczej), which contains probably the oldest known bee gum in the world, aged over 1400 years.

== Cuisine ==
Among the popular traditional dishes of north-eastern Poland, including Augustów, are kartacze and potato babka. Popular regional cakes are sękacz and mrowisko (lit. transl. "anthill"). Officially protected traditional foods from Augustów and its surroundings include the Augustów honey (miód augustowski) which comes in several variants, and augustowska jagodzianka, a local yeast roll stuffed with blueberries and topped with streusel, a popular dessert.

== Sports ==
The main sports club of the town is Sparta Augustów with football and canoeing sections.

== International relations ==
=== Twin towns – sister cities ===
Augustów is twinned with:

- Druskininkai, Lithuania (2007)
- Porto Ceresio, Italy (2003)
- Rudky, Ukraine (2011)
- Supraśl, Poland (2012)
- Tuusula, Finland (1996)

Former twin towns

- Grodno, Belarus (2008–2022)
- Slonim, Belarus (2013–2022)

On 7 March 2022, partnership with Belarusian cities was terminated due to Belarus's involvement in the 2022 Russian invasion of Ukraine.

== Notable residents ==
- Edyta Dzieniszewska (born 1986), sprint canoer
- Joanna Fiodorow (born 1989), hammer thrower
- Jan Jaworowski (1923–2013), mathematician
- Zbigniew Kundzewicz (born 1950), hydrologist and climatologist
- Emil Leon Post (1897–1954), mathematician and logician
- Andrzej Sobolewski (born 1951), physicist
- Rose Pastor Stokes (1879–1933) American socialist activist, writer, birth control advocate, and feminist.
- Adam Wysocki (born 1974), sprint canoer
- Marek Zalewski (born 1963), archbishop

== See also ==
- Augustów Canal
