= Gorey (disambiguation) =

Gorey is a market town in north County Wexford, Ireland.

Gorey may also refer to:

- Gorey (surname), list of people with the name
- Gorey, Jersey, Channel Islands, a village
  - Mont Orgueil, Jersey, also known as Gorey Castle
- Gorey, County Tyrone, Northern Ireland, a townland

== Associated with the County Wexford town ==
- Gorey Community School
- Gorey Guardian, a local newspaper
- Gorey railway station
- Gorey RFC, a rugby team
- Gorey (Parliament of Ireland constituency), to 1800
- Gorey (barony)

== See also ==
- Jouri, an Arabic female name
