= Markuszów =

- Village
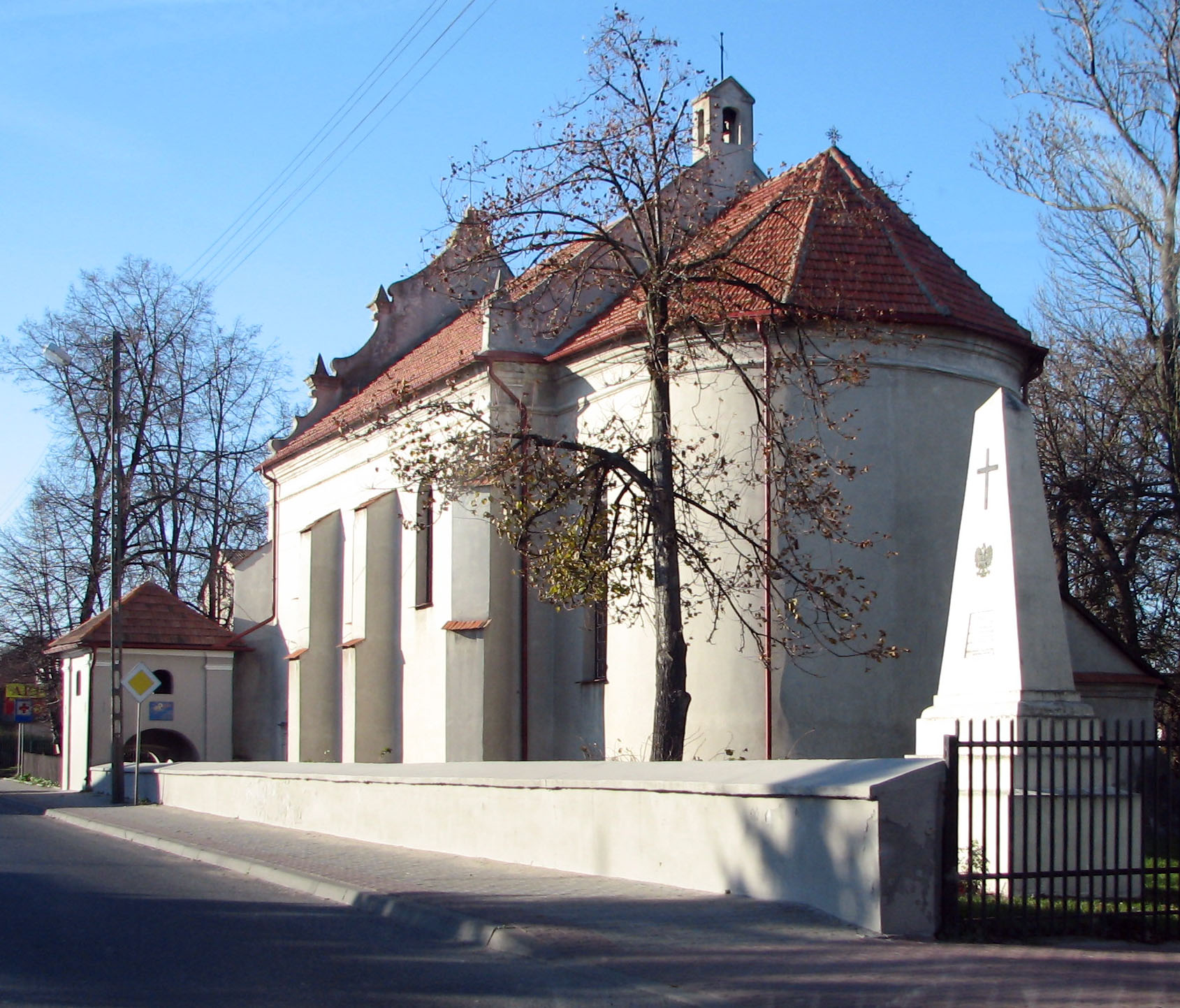
- Church of the Holy Spirit in Markuszów, erected circa 1609

- Coat of arms

- Location within Poland
- Coordinates: 51°22′28″N 22°15′30″E
- Country: Poland
- Voivodeship: Lublin
- County: Puławy
- Gmina: Markuszów
- Population (2022): 1,155
- Postal code: 24-173
- Area code: 81
- Vehicle registration: LPU

Markuszów (historically also Markuszew) [marˈkuʂuf] is a village (formerly a town) in Puławy County, Lublin Voivodeship, in eastern Poland. It is the seat of the gmina (administrative district) called Gmina Markuszów. The village is situated on the Kurówka River.

Markuszów received its town privileges around 1550, which were confirmed and expanded in 1686. The town was stripped of its municipal status in 1869 as part of Russian reprisals following the January Uprising. Historically, the settlement is located in Lesser Poland (initially in Sandomierz Land, later in Lublin Land). In the second half of the 16th century, it was part of Lublin County in Lublin Voivodeship.

The village contains 20 named streets and is the seat of the Roman Catholic parish of St. Joseph.

== Etymology ==
The name Markuszów most likely derives from the founder and first owner of the village, who may have been named Marcus (Polish: Marek). With the addition of the suffix "-ewice," the settlement name was formed.

== History ==
=== Medieval period ===
The first written mention of Markuszów dates from 1317, when Duke Władysław I Łokietek (Władysław the Elbow-high), at the request of Dzierżek (a canon of Kraków) and his brother Ostasz of Bejsce (progenitor of the Firlej family), transferred Markuszów from Polish law to Środa law. This occurred on November 30, 1317 in Kraków. In 1330, Markuszów was granted Magdeburg rights.

In 1351, Markuszów was inherited by Ostasz's son Eustachy, who served as castellan of Lublin and deputy butler of Kraków. After his death in 1359, his son Piotr inherited the estate. Piotr's great-grandson Jan Firlej was the next heir. From this time, the branch of the Firlej family owning Markuszów adopted the name Markuszewski (later Markuszowski) after the settlement.

=== Firlej family rule (16th century) ===
The Markuszowski branch of the Firlej family ruled Markuszów until the early 16th century, when after the extinction of this family line with Katarzyna Kazanowska (judge's wife of Łuków), the estate passed to the main Firlej line in 1521. The Firlej family was one of the most powerful knightly families between the Vistula and Bug rivers and played an exceptional role in the colonization of these areas.

The most significant contributor to Markuszów's development was Piotr Firlej, voivode of Lublin and Ruthenia, who initiated the transformation of Markuszów into a town around 1550. The current coat of arms of Gmina Markuszów features the Firlej family's "Lewart" (leopard) symbol on a blue background, reflecting this heritage.

=== Decline and Sobieski ownership (17th century) ===
In the second half of the 17th century, the Khmelnytsky Uprising, the Swedish Deluge, and numerous Tatar raids devastated the town, which lay on a major route. With Markuszów's decline, Firlej family rule also ended. The last representative was Jan Firlej, castellan of Lublin, who died after 1667.

The next owner was King John III Sobieski himself. As a private noble town, Markuszów passed from the Firlej family to the Sobieskis for an extended period, before changing hands among subsequent owners. On February 25, 1686, in his family seat of Żółkiew, John III Sobieski confirmed Markuszów's town rights and granted new privileges, including the right to hold six three-day fairs annually (on the feasts of St. Matthias, St. Joseph, St. Stanislaus, St. James, St. Hedwig, and St. Thomas), as well as the right to distill and sell vodka for six years. Weekly markets were moved from Tuesdays to Sundays. Townspeople gained the right to annually elect four candidates for wójt (mayor), from whom the lord would choose.

=== 18th century ===
After King John's death, the Markuszów estates belonged to his son Jakub. The next owner was Jakub's daughter Maria Karolina. After her death on May 8, 1740, the Sobieski estates passed to Michał Kazimierz Radziwiłł "Rybeńko." The estates subsequently passed through several hands, including Stefan Humiecki, whose daughter Izabella (married to Jan Małachowski) received them as dowry. Their son Jacek Małachowski sold Markuszów on November 17, 1765 to Kajetan Hryniewiecki, castellan of Lublin.

Kajetan Hryniewiecki, of the Przeginia coat of arms, granted further privileges in 1787. His ordinances organized municipal finances, sanitary conditions, fire regulations, and schools. As the last voivode of Lublin before the Partitions of Poland (1782-1795), he was a significant figure in the region. Under his rule, Markuszów experienced intensive expansion and modernization; its fairs, along with cattle fairs in Łęczna, came to dominate Lublin regional trade at the expense of Lublin itself.

During the War in Defense of the Constitution, the Battle of Markuszów (1792) took place nearby between Polish forces and Russian invaders.

=== 19th century ===
On June 8, 1799, Rafał Amor Count Tarnowski purchased the Markuszów estates from Ignacy Hryniewiecki for 650 Polish złoty. His son Władysław Count Tarnowski inherited them in 1803. On June 23, 1832, Władysław sold Markuszów and surrounding estates to Grzegorz Zbyszewski. The estates then included the town of Markuszów, manor farms in Olempin and Olszowiec, a granary in Kazimierz, and the villages of Góry, Zabłocie, Kłoda, Bobowiska, Łąkoć, Barłogi, Choszczów, Łany, and Kaleń.

In 1853, Wiktoryn Zbyszewski inherited the estate worth 153,000 rubles. He later went bankrupt, and on June 26, 1871, Wincenty Dobrzelewski purchased the estate at auction. The Markuszów estates were later acquired by Zofia Wernicka, who in 1912 sold them to Bohdan Broniewski, owner of the Garbów estates. After parcellation in 1938, the Broniewski family retained a 40-hectare plot including ponds, remnants of the park, and a classicist brick kitchen building (originally from the palace) used as a residence. The Markuszów palace itself had been demolished for bricks in the late 19th century. The Broniewski family kept the park and other properties until the land reform after World War II, when they lost these as well.

=== National uprisings ===
Markuszów played a role in all Polish national uprisings. In June 1794, insurgent forces under General Józef Zajączek gathered near Markuszów during the Kościuszko Uprising. On March 3, 1831, during the November Uprising, General Józef Dwernicki defeated a strong Russian corps commanded by Colonel Tuchachevsky at the Battle of Kurów near Markuszów.

During the January Uprising, many skirmishes took place in the Markuszów area. A significant battle between insurgents and Russian forces occurred in Góry on December 19, 1863. The mayor of Markuszów, Antoni Zdanowicz, was one of the insurgent military commanders for Lublin Voivodeship. These events resulted in the town being stripped of its municipal rights, as happened to many other Polish localities. Markuszów also suffered during World War I military operations.

=== Mariavite parish ===
In 1906, a Mariavite parish dedicated to the Blessed Sacrament was established on the border of Łany and Markuszów, founded by Father Piotr Maria Ładysław Goliński, formerly a vicar of the St. Joseph the Spouse parish in Markuszów. Between 1907 and 1909, the Mariavites built their own church and established a separate denominational cemetery.

=== World War II and the Holocaust ===
In 1939, German air raids severely damaged Markuszów. The Church of the Holy Spirit was partially destroyed, the central part of the town inhabited by the Jewish population was completely burned down, and many other buildings were damaged or destroyed.

==== Jewish community ====
The first mention of Jews in Markuszów appears in 1630. In 1661, there were 9 Jews; by 1756, the number had grown to 356; and in 1827, there were 343 Jews, comprising 42.5% of the total population. The local Jewish community received permission to build a synagogue in 1681. The Jews of Markuszów also had two cemeteries—an old one and a new one.

Before the Holocaust, the Jewish population numbered approximately 2,000, constituting slightly more than half of the settlement's inhabitants. In the 1921 census, Markuszów had 1,001 Jewish residents, representing 54.2% of the population. In April 1942, about 500 Jews, mainly the elderly and ill, were deported to the Sobibor extermination camp. The deported were replaced by a large group of displaced Jewish refugees from Slovakia. A group of Jewish partisans from Markuszów operated in the forests for some time, but most were captured and executed. On May 9, 1942, the remaining Jews from the ghetto were deported to the gas chambers at Sobibór, while some were killed on the spot. The Jewish community ceased to exist. The Germans also devastated the local Jewish cemeteries and destroyed the synagogue.

The resistance movement, particularly the Bataliony Chłopskie (BCh) and Armia Krajowa (AK), was very active during the war.

=== Administrative changes ===
From 1954 to 1972, the village belonged to and was the seat of the gromada of Markuszów. From 1975 to 1998, the locality was situated in the former Lublin Voivodeship.

The village was the seat of Gmina Markuszów, which existed until 1973 and was reactivated in 1984 (albeit with a smaller area).

== Notable landmarks ==
=== Religious buildings ===
- Church of St. Joseph the Spouse – the parish church
- Church of the Holy Spirit (Polish: Kościół Świętego Ducha) – a former hospital church, erected circa 1608 by Italian architect Piotr Durie
- Church of the Blessed Sacrament – a Mariavite church located on the border of Łany and Markuszów
- Church of St. Margaret – no longer extant since the mid-15th century
- Markuszów Synagogue – destroyed by Germans during World War II

=== Cemeteries ===
- Roman Catholic cemetery in Markuszów
- Mariavite cemetery in Markuszów
- Old Jewish cemetery in Markuszów
- New Jewish cemetery in Markuszów

== Tourism ==
Markuszów is located on the Lublin Renaissance Trail.

== Education ==
A kindergarten (pre-school), primary school, and gymnasium (middle school) are located in Markuszów and serve students within the gmina. The primary school and gymnasium are housed in the same building. The primary school is named after Jan Pocek, a folk poet from the neighboring village of Zabłocie, and serves approximately 150 students. Around 70 students attend the gymnasium.

Students must commute to, or move to, a larger city like Lublin or Puławy to continue studies in a liceum or technikum.

== Transport ==
National roads DK17 (Warsaw–Hrebenne), DK12 (Łęknica–Dorohusk), and E372 pass jointly through Markuszów. The S17 and S12 expressways, completed in the 2010s, now bypass the village to the north, diverting most Lublin-Warsaw traffic away from the village center.

== See also ==
- Gmina Markuszów
- Firlej family
- John III Sobieski
- Lublin Renaissance Trail
