= Robert Rhodes =

Robert Rhodes may refer to:

- Robert Heaton Rhodes (1815–1884), New Zealand politician
- Sir Robert Heaton Rhodes (1861–1956), his son, New Zealand politician and lawyer
- Robert L. Rhodes, provost at Abilene Christian University

== See also ==
- Robert Ben Rhoades (born 1945), serial killer
- Robert Rodes, Confederate general
- Robert Rhodes, English actor
