= Kevin Gorey =

American epidemiologist and social worker

Kevin M. Gorey
- Born: El Paso, Texas
- Education: State University of New York at Buffalo
- Known for: Social epidemiology Health disparities
- Awards: Fellow of the American College of Epidemiology; Canadian Institutes of Health Research Career Investigator Award; Ontario Premier's Research Excellence Award; School Psychology Quarterly Article of the year award
- Scientific career
- Fields: Epidemiology; Social work
- Workplaces: University of Windsor
- Thesis: The association of socioeconomic inequality with cancer incidence: An explanation for racial group cancer differentials (1994)
- Doctoral advisor: John E. Vena

Kevin Michael Gorey is an American epidemiologist and social worker. He is a professor in the School of Social Work at the University of Windsor in Ontario, Canada. He is known for his Canada–USA comparative research on cancer treatment access and survival. He has also published research showing that well endowed preschool interventions can increase children's IQ scores by an average of nearly 15 points.

== Honors and awards ==
In 2002, Gorey received the article of the year award from School Psychology Quarterly. He was named a fellow of the American College of Epidemiology in 2006.
