= Mazurki, Podlaskie Voivodeship =

Mazurki
- Village
- Location within Poland
- Coordinates: 53°52′58″N 22°52′55″E
- Country: Poland
- Voivodeship: Podlaskie
- County: Augustów
- Gmina: Augustów

Mazurki [maˈzurkʲi] is a village in the administrative district of Gmina Augustów, within Augustów County, Podlaskie Voivodeship, in north-eastern Poland.
