= Jori =

Jori may refer to:

== People ==
- Jori Hulkkonen, Finnish DJ
- Jori Mørkve, Norwegian biathlete
- Jori Lehterä, Finnish ice hockey
- Jori Harju, Finnish two-star admiral
- Jori Smith, Canadian modernist painter
- Jori Finkel, contemporary art writer
- Jöri Kindschi, Swiss cross-county skier
- Alberto Jori, Italian Neo-Aristolean philosopher
- Jori Aro, Finnish curler
- Joriwinnyson Santos dos Anjos Rodrigues, Brazilian footballer
- Jori Chisholm, American bagpipe player

== Locations ==
- Jori Kalan, town in India
- Jori, Gurugram, town in India
- Jori Pintay, Peruvian mountain
- Jori Pucara, Peruvian mountain

== Other ==
- Jori family, old Swiss noble family
- Jori (instrument), percussion instrument from Punjab
- TV Kochi (JORI-DTV), a television station in Kochi, Kochi Prefecture, Japan
- Jory (disambiguation)
