= Jabłońskie, Podlaskie Voivodeship =

Jabłońskie
- Village
- Location within Poland
- Coordinates: 53°56′N 22°51′E
- Country: Poland
- Voivodeship: Podlaskie
- County: Augustów
- Gmina: Augustów

Jabłońskie [jaˈbwɔɲskʲɛ] is a village in the administrative district of Gmina Augustów, within Augustów County, Podlaskie Voivodeship, in north-eastern Poland.
