= Gmina Markuszów =

Gmina Markuszów Markuszów Commune
- Gmina
- Coat of arms
- Interactive map of Gmina Markuszów
- Coordinates (Markuszów): 51°22′N 22°16′E
- Country: Poland
- Voivodeship: Lublin
- County: Puławy
- Seat: Markuszów

Area
  - Total: 40.39 km^{2} (15.59 sq mi)

Population (2015)
  - Total: 3,005
  - Density: 74.4/km^{2} (193/sq mi)
- Website: http://www.markuszow.pl/

Gmina Markuszów is a rural gmina (administrative district) in Puławy County, Lublin Voivodeship, in eastern Poland. Its seat is the village of Markuszów, which lies approximately 22 kilometres (14 mi) east of Puławy and 25 km (16 mi) north-west of the regional capital Lublin.

The gmina covers an area of 40.39 square kilometres (15.6 sq mi), and as of 2011 its total population is 3,070. It is the smallest gmina in Puławy County in terms of area as well as population.

== Villages ==
Gmina Markuszów contains the villages and settlements of Bobowiska, Góry, Kaleń, Kolonia Góry, Łany, Markuszów, Olempin, Olszowiec, Wólka Kątna and Zabłocie.

== Demographics ==
Population data as of December 31, 2011:

	Residents	Percent	Density/km²
Male	1,478	49.2%	36.6
Female	1,527	50.8%	37.8
TOTAL	3,005	100%	74.4

== Neighbouring gminas ==
Gmina Markuszów is bordered by the gminas of Abramów, Garbów, Kurów and Nałęczów.
