= Twardy Róg =

- Settlement
- Location within Poland
- Coordinates: 53°45′26″N 23°0′27″E
- Country: Poland
- Voivodeship: Podlaskie
- County: Augustów
- Gmina: Augustów

Twardy Róg [ˈtfardɨ ˈruk] is a settlement in the administrative district of Gmina Augustów, within Augustów County, Podlaskie Voivodeship, in north-eastern Poland.
