= Wólka Kątna =

- Village
- Location within Poland
- Coordinates: 51°26′N 22°17′E
- Country: Poland
- Voivodeship: Lublin
- County: Puławy
- Gmina: Markuszów
- Population: 153
- Website: http://www.wolkakatna.pl

Wólka Kątna [ˈvulka ˈkɔntna] is a village in the administrative district of Gmina Markuszów, within Puławy County, Lublin Voivodeship, in eastern Poland.
