= Jeziorki, Augustów County =

Jeziorki
- Village
- Location within Poland
- Coordinates: 53°50′13″N 22°49′23″E
- Country: Poland
- Voivodeship: Podlaskie
- County: Augustów
- Gmina: Augustów
- Population: 320

Jeziorki [jɛˈʑɔrkʲi] is a village in the administrative district of Gmina Augustów, within Augustów County, Podlaskie Voivodeship, in north-eastern Poland.
