= Rutki Nowe =

- Village
- Location within Poland
- Coordinates: 53°50′55″N 22°47′9″E
- Country: Poland
- Voivodeship: Podlaskie
- County: Augustów
- Gmina: Augustów

Rutki Nowe [ˈrutkʲi ˈnɔvɛ] is a village in the administrative district of Gmina Augustów, within Augustów County, Podlaskie Voivodeship, in north-eastern Poland.
