= Stare Rudki =

- Village
- Location within Poland
- Coordinates: 53°51′40″N 22°48′4″E
- Country: Poland
- Voivodeship: Podlaskie
- County: Augustów
- Gmina: Augustów

Stare Rudki [ˈstarɛ ˈrutkʲi] is a village in the administrative district of Gmina Augustów, within Augustów County, Podlaskie Voivodeship, in north-eastern Poland.
