= Gorey (surname) =

Gorey is a surname. Its meaning is not clear, but it is argued that the word is related to the Irish given name Guaire and the Norse given name Gofraidh. Notable people with the surname include:

- Alicia Gorey, Australian journalist and news presenter
- Denis Gorey (1874–1940), Irish politician
- Edward Gorey (1925–2000), American writer and artist
- Kevin Gorey, American epidemiologist and social worker
- Natassia Gorey-Furber, Australian actress

== See also ==
- Görey, list of people with a similar surname of Turkish origin
