= Komaszówka, Gmina Augustów =

Komaszówka
- Village
- Location within Poland
- Coordinates: 53°45′16″N 23°1′39″E
- Country: Poland
- Voivodeship: Podlaskie
- County: Augustów
- Gmina: Augustów

Komaszówka [kɔmaˈʂufka] is a village in the administrative district of Gmina Augustów, within Augustów County, Podlaskie Voivodeship, in north-eastern Poland.
