= Chomątowo =

Village in Gmina Augustów, Poland

- Village
- Location within Poland
- Coordinates: 53°54′26.9″N 22°46′57.6″E
- Country: Poland
- Voivodeship: Podlaskie
- County: Augustów
- Gmina: Augustów
- Population: 68

Chomątowo [xɔmɔnˈtɔvɔ] is a village in the administrative district of Gmina Augustów, within Augustów County, Podlaskie Voivodeship, in north-eastern Poland.
