= Jory =

Jory may refer to:

== Persons ==
- Jory (surname)
- Jory Nash, folk music-oriented Canadian singer-songwriter and musician
- Jory Prum (born 1975), American audio engineer
- Jory Vinikour (born 1963), American harpsichordist
- Jory (singer) or Jory Boy, a Puerto Rican reggaeton singer
- Alluringskull, a TikToker by the name of Jory

== Others ==
- Jory (soil), a type of soil
- Jory (film), a 1973 Western starring Robby Benson

== See also ==
- Jori (disambiguation)
- Jouri, an Arabic female name
