= Robert L. Rhodes =

Robert Lynn Rhodes
- Education: Oklahoma Christian University, University of Northern Colorado
- Occupation: Provost
- Employer: Abilene Christian University
- Predecessor: Jeanine Varner

Robert L. Rhodes is the senior vice president of academic affairs at Abilene Christian University.

== Life ==
Robert Rhodes grew up in Wichita Falls, Texas, the son of a Church of Christ preacher. He started his education at York College in Nebraska. He completed his undergraduate work at Oklahoma Christian University. He completed his Ph.D. in 1994 at University of Northern Colorado. He worked as a school psychologist before starting his 17-year career at New Mexico State University in 1996. While there, he served as the head of the department of Special Education and Communication Disorders and associate dean in the College of Education at New Mexico State University. In 2009, he was named an American Council on Education fellow and spent a year at Pepperdine University working on accreditation and strategy. Robert also served as the president of New Mexico Association of School Psychologist and a state delegate to the National Association of School Psychologists. He also served as an associate editor of School Psychology Quarterly.

== Education ==
- B.S. Oklahoma Christian University (1990)
- Ph.D. University of Northern Colorado (1994)

== Publications ==
- Assessing Culturally and Linguistically Diverse Students: A Practical Guide, New York City, New York: Guilford Press, 2005. ISBN 978-1-59385-141-5.
