= Gmina Augustów =

Gmina Augustów Augustów Commune
- Gmina
- Coat of arms

- Gmina Augustów within the Augustów County
- Coordinates (Augustów): 53°51′N 22°58′E
- Country: Poland
- Voivodeship: Podlaskie
- County: Augustów
- Seat: Augustów

Area
  - Total: 266.52 km^{2} (102.90 sq mi)

Population (2019-06-30)
  - Total: 6,764
  - Density: 25.38/km^{2} (65.73/sq mi)
- Website: http://www.gmina-augustow.home.pl/

Gmina Augustów is a rural gmina (administrative district) in Augustów County, Podlaskie Voivodeship, in north-eastern Poland. Its seat is the town of Augustów, although the town is not part of the territory of the gmina.

The gmina covers an area of 266.52 square kilometres (102.9 sq mi), and as of 2019 its population is 6,764.

== Villages ==
Gmina Augustów contains the villages and settlements of Białobrzegi, Biernatki, Bór, Chomątowo, Czarnucha, Czerkiesy, Gabowe Grądy, Gliniski, Góry, Grabowo, Grabowo-Kolonie, Jabłońskie, Janówka, Jeziorki, Kolnica, Komaszówka, Mazurki, Mikołajówek, Naddawki, Netta (in fact three villages: Netta I, Netta II and Netta-Folwark), Obuchowizna, Osowy Grąd, Ponizie, Posielanie, Promiski, Pruska Mała, Pruska Wielka, Rutki Nowe, Rzepiski, Stare Rudki, Stuczanka, Świderek, Topiłówka, Turówka, Twardy Róg, Uścianki, Żarnowo (Żarnowo I, Żarnowo II, Żarnowo III) and Zielone.

== Neighbouring gminas ==
Gmina Augustów is bordered by the gminas of Bargłów Kościelny, Kalinowo, Nowinka, Płaska, Raczki and Sztabin.
