= Gliniski =

- Village
- Location within Poland
- Coordinates: 53°47′N 22°57′E
- Country: Poland
- Voivodeship: Podlaskie
- County: Augustów
- Gmina: Augustów
- Time zone: UTC+1 (CET)
  - Summer (DST): UTC+2 (CEST)

Gliniski [ɡlʲiˈɲiskʲi] is a village in the administrative district of Gmina Augustów, within Augustów County, Podlaskie Voivodeship, in north-eastern Poland.

== History ==
Three Polish citizens were murdered by Nazi Germany in the village during World War II.
