= Kaleń, Lublin Voivodeship =

Kaleń
- Village
- Location within Poland
- Coordinates: 51°22′10″N 22°13′37″E
- Country: Poland
- Voivodeship: Lublin
- County: Puławy
- Gmina: Markuszów

Population
  - Total: 200
- Time zone: UTC+1 (CET)
  - Summer (DST): UTC+2 (CEST)

Kaleń [ˈkalɛɲ] is a village in the administrative district of Gmina Markuszów, within Puławy County, Lublin Voivodeship, in eastern Poland.

== History ==
Five Polish citizens were murdered by Nazi Germany in the village during World War II.
