= Old Jewish Cemetery in Markuszów =

Former Jewish cemetery in Poland

Details
- Established: 17th century
- Closed: 19th century
- Location: Markuszów, Lublin Voivodeship, Poland
- Type: Jewish cemetery
- Size: 0.1 hectares (0.25 acres)

The Old Jewish Cemetery in Markuszów is a former Jewish cemetery located east of the market square in Markuszów, Lublin Voivodeship, Poland. It occupies an area of 0.1 hectares (0.25 acres).

Due to devastation during World War II and the post-war period, no gravestones have survived. The cemetery was established in the 17th century and remained in use until the 19th century, when the New Jewish Cemetery in Markuszów was opened.

== See also ==
- History of the Jews in Poland
