= Grabowo-Kolonie =

- Village
- Location within Poland
- Coordinates: 53°53′31″N 22°47′10″E
- Country: Poland
- Voivodeship: Podlaskie
- County: Augustów
- Gmina: Augustów

Grabowo-Kolonie [ɡraˈbɔvɔ kɔˈlɔɲɛ] is a village in the administrative district of Gmina Augustów, within Augustów County, Podlaskie Voivodeship, in north-eastern Poland.
