= Gabowe Grądy =

- Village
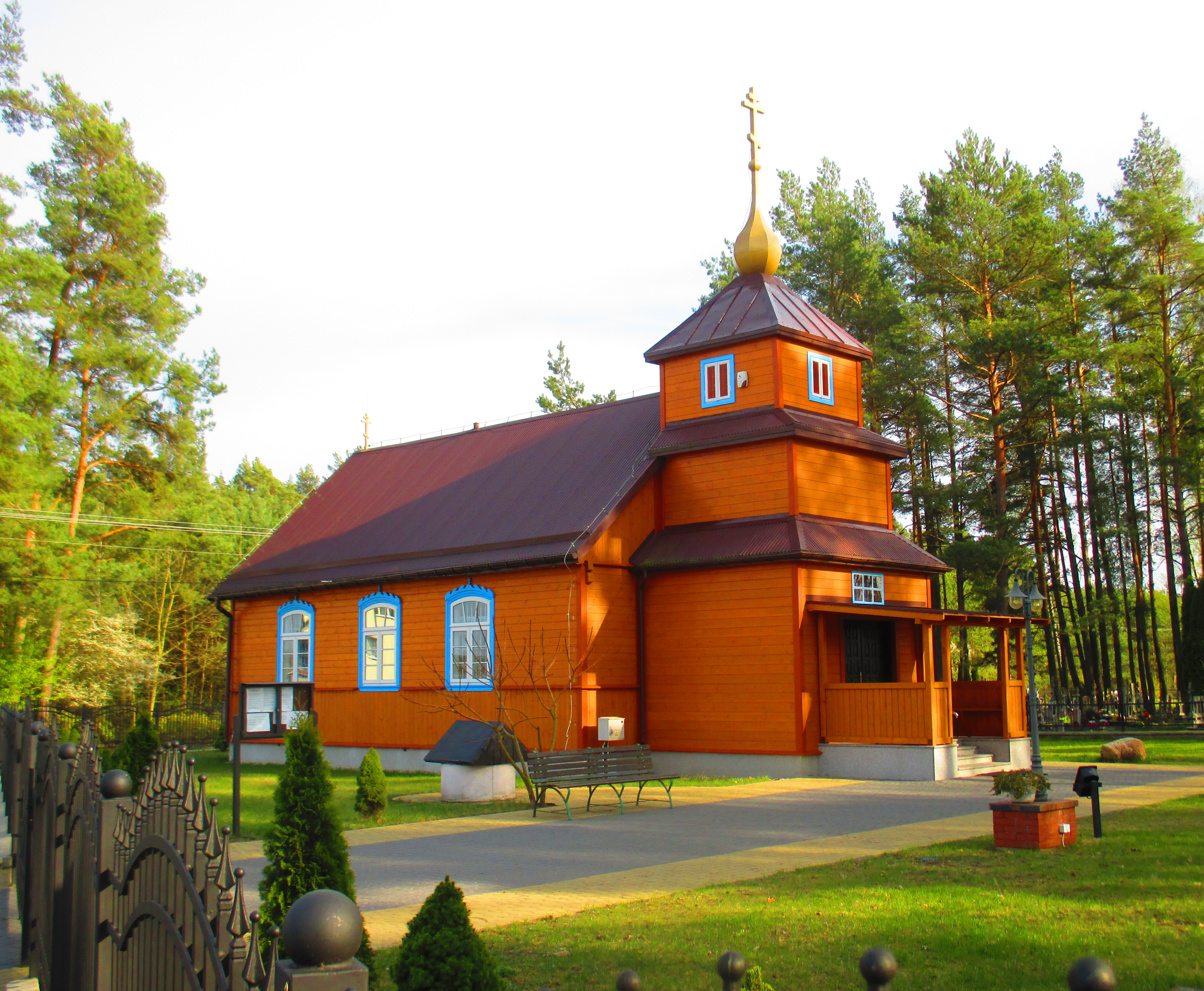
- Church in Gabowe Grądy

- Location within Poland
- Coordinates: 53°45′06″N 22°57′50.5″E
- Country: Poland
- Voivodeship: Podlaskie
- County: Augustów
- Gmina: Augustów

Gabowe Grądy [ɡaˈbɔvɛ ˈɡrɔndɨ] is a village in the administrative district of Gmina Augustów, within Augustów County, Podlaskie Voivodeship, in north-eastern Poland.
