= Pruska Wielka =

- Village
- Location within Poland
- Coordinates: 53°54′N 22°51′E
- Country: Poland
- Voivodeship: Podlaskie
- County: Augustów
- Gmina: Augustów
- Postal code: 16-300
- Vehicle registration: BAU

Pruska Wielka [ˈpruska ˈvʲɛlka] is a village in the administrative district of Gmina Augustów, within Augustów County, Podlaskie Voivodeship, in north-eastern Poland.

Four Polish citizens were murdered by Nazi Germany in the village during World War II.
