= Turówka, Podlaskie Voivodeship =

Turówka
- Village
- Location within Poland
- Coordinates: 53°51′18″N 22°50′21″E
- Country: Poland
- Voivodeship: Podlaskie
- County: Augustów
- Gmina: Augustów

Turówka [tuˈrufka] is a village in the administrative district of Gmina Augustów, within Augustów County, Podlaskie Voivodeship, in north-eastern Poland.
