= Olszowiec, Puławy County =

Olszowiec
- Village
- Location within Poland
- Coordinates: 51°21′32″N 22°13′29″E
- Country: Poland
- Voivodeship: Lublin
- County: Puławy
- Gmina: Markuszów
- Population: 89

Olszowiec [ɔlˈʂɔvjɛt͡s] is a village in the administrative district of Gmina Markuszów, within Puławy County, Lublin Voivodeship, in eastern Poland. As of the latest available data, Olszowiec has a population of 5 residents
