= Posielanie =

- Village
- Location within Poland
- Coordinates: 53°54′16″N 22°49′39″E
- Country: Poland
- Voivodeship: Podlaskie
- County: Augustów
- Gmina: Augustów
- Elevation: 120–130 m (390–430 ft)
- Population: ~50−60

Posielanie [pɔɕɛˈlaɲɛ] is a village in the administrative district of Gmina Augustów, within Augustów County, Podlaskie Voivodeship, in north-eastern Poland.
