= Czarnucha =

- Village
- Location within Poland
- Coordinates: 53°49′N 23°3′E
- Country: Poland
- Voivodeship: Podlaskie
- County: Augustów
- Gmina: Augustów

Czarnucha [t͡ʂarˈnuxa] is a village in the administrative district of Gmina Augustów, within Augustów County, Podlaskie Voivodeship, in north-eastern Poland.
