= Görey =

Görey is a Turkish surname which was developed during the Turkish language reform which took place in the early period of the Republic of Turkey. It means "scene, landscape and view".

Notable people with the surname include:

- İhap Hulusi Görey (1898–1986), Turkish graphic artist
- Yavuz Görey (1912–1995), Turkish sculptor

== See also ==
- Gorey (surname), list of people with a similar surname of Irish origin
