= Naddawki =

- Village
- Location within Poland
- Coordinates: 53°48′13″N 22°54′17″E
- Country: Poland
- Voivodeship: Podlaskie
- County: Augustów
- Gmina: Augustów

Naddawki [naˈdːafkʲi] is a village in the administrative district of Gmina Augustów, within Augustów County, Podlaskie Voivodeship, in north-eastern Poland.
