= Grabowo, Augustów County =

Grabowo
- Village
- Location within Poland
- Coordinates: 53°54′N 22°49′E
- Country: Poland
- Voivodeship: Podlaskie
- County: Augustów
- Gmina: Augustów

Grabowo [ɡraˈbɔvɔ], (Lithuanian: Grabava), is a village in the administrative district of Gmina Augustów, within Augustów County, Podlaskie Voivodeship, in north-eastern Poland.
