= Świderek =

- Village
- Location within Poland
- Coordinates: 53°45′50″N 22°56′21″E
- Country: Poland
- Voivodeship: Podlaskie
- County: Augustów
- Gmina: Augustów

Świderek (Polish pronunciation: [ɕfiˈdɛrɛk]) is a village in the administrative district of Gmina Augustów, within Augustów County, Podlaskie Voivodeship, in north-eastern Poland.
