= Zielone, Podlaskie Voivodeship =

Zielone
- Settlement
- Location within Poland
- Coordinates: 53°46′25″N 23°4′21″E
- Country: Poland
- Voivodeship: Podlaskie
- County: Augustów
- Gmina: Augustów

Zielone [ʑɛˈlɔnɛ] is a settlement in the administrative district of Gmina Augustów, within Augustów County, Podlaskie Voivodeship, in north-eastern Poland.
