= Uścianki, Augustów County =

Uścianki
- Village
- Location within Poland
- Coordinates: 53°49′N 22°53′E
- Country: Poland
- Voivodeship: Podlaskie
- County: Augustów
- Gmina: Augustów

Uścianki [uɕˈt͡ɕaŋkʲi] is a village in the administrative district of Gmina Augustów, within Augustów County, Podlaskie Voivodeship, in northeastern Poland.
