= Bobowiska =

- Village
- Location within Poland
- Coordinates: 51°25′N 22°16′E
- Country: Poland
- Voivodeship: Lublin
- County: Puławy
- Gmina: Markuszów
- Population (2009): 170

Bobowiska [bɔbɔˈviska] is a village in the administrative district of Gmina Markuszów, within Puławy County, Lublin Voivodeship, in eastern Poland.
