= Łany, Puławy County =

Łany
- Village
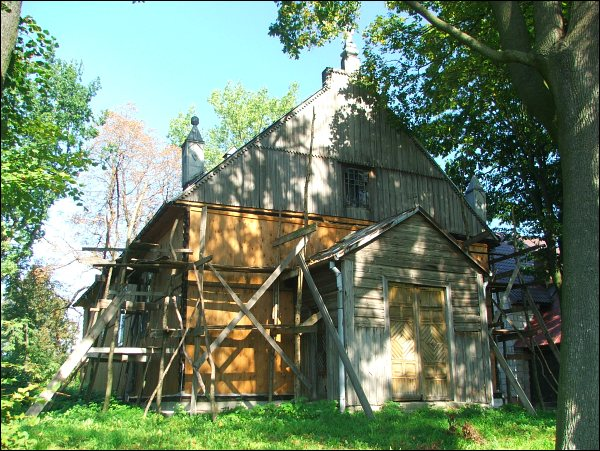
- Old Mariavite Church in Łany.

- Location within Poland
- Coordinates: 51°22′19″N 22°14′31″E
- Country: Poland
- Voivodeship: Lublin
- County: Puławy
- Gmina: Markuszów
- Population: 341

Łany [ˈwanɨ] is a village in the administrative district of Gmina Markuszów, within Puławy County, Lublin Voivodeship, in eastern Poland.
