= Olempin =

- Village
- Location within Poland
- Coordinates: 51°24′N 22°15′E
- Country: Poland
- Voivodeship: Lublin
- County: Puławy
- Gmina: Markuszów
- Population (2009): 127

Olempin [ɔˈlɛmpin] is a village in the administrative district of Gmina Markuszów, within Puławy County, Lublin Voivodeship, in eastern Poland.
