= Czerkiesy, Podlaskie Voivodeship =

Czerkiesy
- Village
- Location within Poland
- Coordinates: 53°50′9″N 22°47′9″E
- Country: Poland
- Voivodeship: Podlaskie
- County: Augustów
- Gmina: Augustów
- Population: 320

Czerkiesy [t͡ʂɛrˈkʲɛsɨ] is a village in the administrative district of Gmina Augustów, within Augustów County, Podlaskie Voivodeship, in north-eastern Poland.
