= Mikołajówek, Podlaskie Voivodeship =

Village in Gmina Augustów, Poland

Mikołajówek
- Village
- Location within Poland
- Coordinates: 53°55′54.2″N 22°50′07.5″E
- Country: Poland
- Voivodeship: Podlaskie
- County: Augustów
- Gmina: Augustów

Mikołajówek [mʲikɔwaˈjuvɛk] is a village in the administrative district of Gmina Augustów, within Augustów County, Podlaskie Voivodeship, in north-eastern Poland.
