= Kolonia Góry =

- Village
- Location within Poland
- Coordinates: 51°20′39″N 22°15′30″E
- Country: Poland
- Voivodeship: Lublin
- County: Puławy
- Gmina: Markuszów
- Population: 86

Kolonia Góry [kɔˈlɔɲa ˈɡurɨ] is a village in the administrative district of Gmina Markuszów, within Puławy County, Lublin Voivodeship, in eastern Poland.
