= Gorey, County Tyrone =

Gorey
- Townland
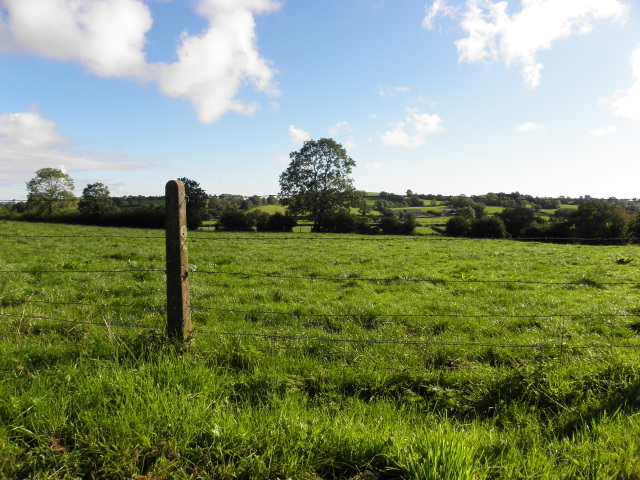
- Fields in Gorey townland

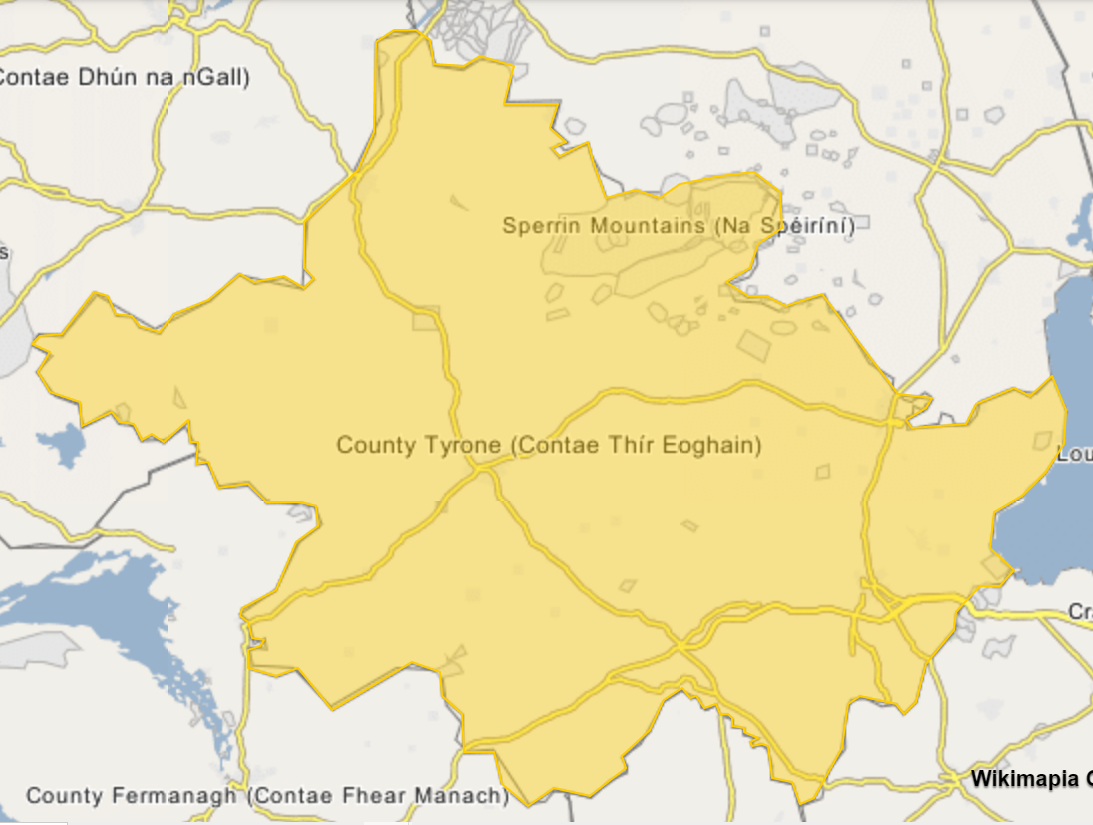
- Location within Northern Ireland
- Civil parish: Donaghmore
- County: County Tyrone
- Country: Northern Ireland
- Sovereign state: United Kingdom
- Post town: DUNGANNON
- Postcode district: BT70
- Dialling code: 028
- Police: Northern Ireland
- Fire: Northern Ireland
- Ambulance: Northern Ireland
- UK Parliament: Fermanagh and South Tyrone
- NI Assembly: Fermanagh and South Tyrone

Gorey is a small townland in the civil parish of Donaghmore in County Tyrone, Northern Ireland. It is situated midway between Dungannon and Ballygawley, close to the village of Cabragh. Gorey townland is approximately 279 acres (0.44 sq mi) in area.

== Demographics ==
In the 1926 Northern Ireland census, 44 people were living in Gorey, a slight increase from 43 as of the 1911 census. In 1926, 28 males (63.6%) and 16 females (36.4%) were recorded.

The 1937 census recorded 43 inhabitants. By the 1951 census, 24 people lived in Gorey, of which 13 (54.2%) were male and 11 (45.8%) were female.
