= Zabłocie, Puławy County =

Zabłocie
- Village
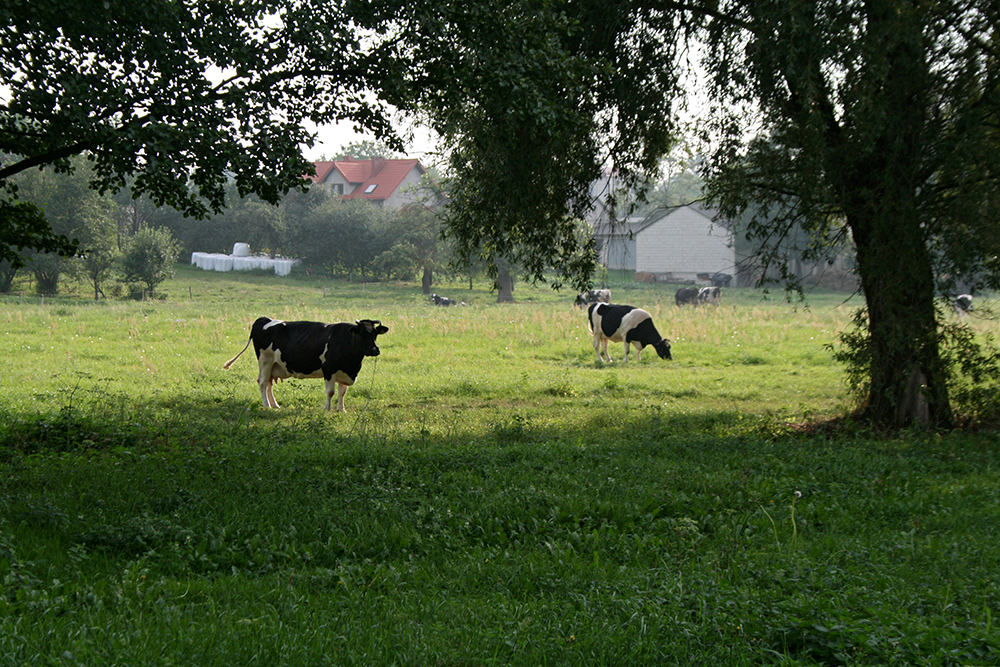
- Cows grazing on a pasture; a common sight in Zabłocie.

- Location within Poland
- Coordinates: 51°22′N 22°15′E
- Country: Poland
- Voivodeship: Lublin
- County: Puławy
- Gmina: Markuszów
- Population (2009): 318

Zabłocie [zaˈbwɔt͡ɕɛ] is a village in the administrative district of Gmina Markuszów, within Puławy County, Lublin Voivodeship, in eastern Poland.

In 2009, the village had a population of 318.
