= Netta Pierwsza =

- Village
- Location within Poland
- Coordinates: 53°46′58″N 22°53′37″E
- Country: Poland
- Voivodeship: Podlaskie
- County: Augustów
- Gmina: Augustów

Netta Pierwsza [ˈnɛtːa ˈpʲɛrfʂa] (Lithuanian: Mėta I) is a village in the administrative district of Gmina Augustów, within Augustów County, Podlaskie Voivodeship, in north-eastern Poland.
