= Jori, Gurugram =

Jori
- Village
- Location in Haryana, India Jori (India)
- Country: India
- State: Haryana
- Region: North India
- District: Gurgaon

Languages
  - Official: Hindi
- Time zone: UTC+5:30 (IST)
- PIN: 122101
- ISO 3166 code: IN-HR
- Vehicle registration: HR-26,72
- Website: haryana.gov.in

Jori is a village in the municipality of Farrukhnagar in the Gurgaon district of Haryana state in northern India. According to the 2011 Census, the population is 3,063 persons in 620 households.
