= Netta-Folwark =

- Village
- Location within Poland
- Coordinates: 53°45′44″N 22°53′18″E
- Country: Poland
- Voivodeship: Podlaskie
- County: Augustów
- Gmina: Augustów

Netta-Folwark [ˈnɛtːa ˈfɔlvark] is a village in the administrative district of Gmina Augustów, within Augustów County, Podlaskie Voivodeship, in north-eastern Poland.
