= Góry, Puławy County =

Góry
- Village
- Location within Poland
- Coordinates: 51°21′34″N 22°16′3″E
- Country: Poland
- Voivodeship: Lublin
- County: Puławy
- Gmina: Markuszów
- Population (2009): 335

Góry [ˈɡurɨ] is a village in the administrative district of Gmina Markuszów, within Puławy County, Lublin Voivodeship, in eastern Poland.

In 2009, the village had an officially reported population of 335.
