= Netta Druga =

- Village
- Location within Poland
- Coordinates: 53°48′17″N 22°53′41″E
- Country: Poland
- Voivodeship: Podlaskie
- County: Augustów
- Gmina: Augustów

Netta Druga [ˈnɛtːa ˈdruɡa] (Lithuanian: Mėta II) is a village in the administrative district of Gmina Augustów, within Augustów County, Podlaskie Voivodeship, in north-eastern Poland.
