= Żarnowo Drugie =

- Village
- Location within Poland
- Coordinates: 53°50′03″N 22°53′21″E
- Country: Poland
- Voivodeship: Podlaskie
- County: Augustów
- Gmina: Augustów

Żarnowo Drugie [ʐarˈnɔvɔ ˈdruɡʲɛ] is a village in the administrative district of Gmina Augustów, within Augustów County, Podlaskie Voivodeship, in north-eastern Poland.
