= Jouri =

Arabic feminine given name

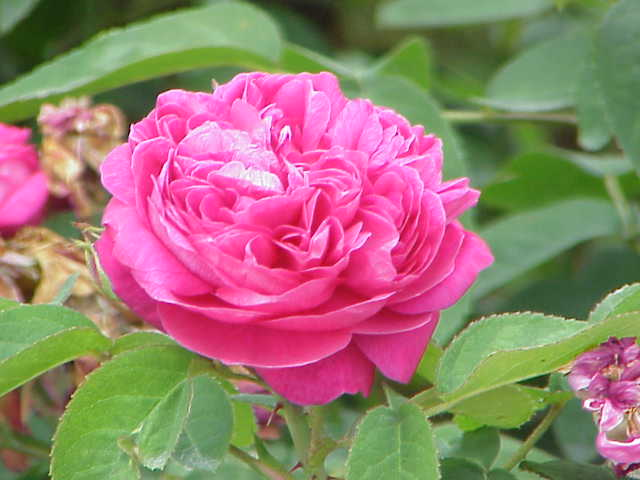
- A damask rose.
- Pronunciation: JO-ree
- Gender: female

Origin
- Origin: Arabic
- Meaning: "Damask rose"

Other names
- Related names: جوري, Gauri, Goree, Gȯry, Joory, Jori, Jorie, Jory, Jourie, Jourry, Joury, Juri, Jūrī, Jury

Jouri is an Arabic feminine given name said to mean damask rose. It is written in Arabic as جوري. It has been translated into other languages with multiple other spellings, including Gauri, Goree, Gȯry, Jawri, Jooree, Joory, Jori, Jorie, Jory, Jouree, Jourie, Joury, Jourry, Juri or Jury.

It is a popular name for girls in Arabic-speaking countries, including Israel, where it was among the ten most popular names given to girls born to Muslim parents in 2020. It was also the most popular name for girls born in Jordan in 2020 and among the top 10 names for girls in Tunisia in 2022.
