= Góry, Podlaskie Voivodeship =

Góry
- Village
- Location within Poland
- Coordinates: 53°47′59″N 23°1′39″E
- Country: Poland
- Voivodeship: Podlaskie
- County: Augustów
- Gmina: Augustów

Góry [ˈɡurɨ] is a village in the administrative district of Gmina Augustów, within Augustów County, Podlaskie Voivodeship, in north-eastern Poland.
