= School Psychology (journal) =

- Discipline: School Psychology
- Language: English
- Edited by: Robin Codding (incoming); Richard C. Gilman (outgoing)

Publication details
- History: 1986-present
- Publisher: American Psychological Association (United States)
- Frequency: Bimonthly
- Impact factor: 3.286 (2020)

Standard abbreviations
- ISO 4: Sch. Psychol.

Indexing
- ISSN: 1045-3830 (print); 1939-1560 (web)

Links
- Online access

School Psychology, formerly known as School Psychology Quarterly, is a peer-reviewed academic journal published by the American Psychological Association on behalf of APA Division 16. The journal was established in 1986 and covers topics such as the "psychology of education and services for children in school settings." The current editor-in-chief is Richard C. Gilman of Cincinnati Children's Hospital Medical Center.

== Abstracting and indexing ==
The journal is abstracted and indexed by MEDLINE/PubMed and the Social Sciences Citation Index. According to the Journal Citation Reports, the journal has a 2020 impact factor of 3.286.
