= Gauri =

Gauri may refer to:

== Religion ==
- Gauri, an epithet of the Hindu goddess Parvati
- Gauri, one of the wives of the sea-god Varuna
- Mahagauri, a manifestation of Hindu goddess Durga
- Lajja Gauri, a goddess associated with abundance and fertility, also euphemistically described as Lajja

== Films ==
- Bhaktha Gowri, a 1941 Indian film
- Gauri (1943 film), an Indian Bollywood film
- Gauri (1968 film), an Indian film
- Gauri Ganesha, a 1991 Kannada comedy-drama film directed by Phani Ramachandra
- Gauri (2006 film), a Marathi film
- Gauri: The Unborn, a 2007 Bollywood film

== Places ==
=== India ===
- Gauri, Siwan, a village in Siwan district, Bihar
- Gauri Bazar, a town and a nagar panchayat in Deoria district, Uttar Pradesh
- Gauri Kund, a Hindu pilgrimage site and base camp for trek to Kedarnath Temple, in Uttaranchal
- Gauri Parbat (Ghori Parbat), a mountain peak, in Uttarakhand
- Gauri Pundah (Gauri Punda), a village in Fatuha development block of district Patna, Bihar
- Jangal Gauri, a village in Gorakhpur, Uttar Pradesh

=== Nepal ===
- Gauri, Bheri, a village in Dailekh District, Bheri Zone
- Gauri, Lumbini, a village in Kapilvastu District, Lumbini Zone

=== Other places ===
- Găuri River, a tributary of the Lotru River in Romania
- Gauri Sankar, a mountain in the Himalayas

== Other uses ==
- Gauri (given name), a Hindu given name (including a list of persons with the name)
- Gauri (raga), raga in Indian classical music
- Gauri (epic), a Nepali epic poem by Madhav Prasad Ghimire

== See also ==
- Gouri (disambiguation)
- Gowri (disambiguation)
- Gori (disambiguation)
- Gaur (disambiguation)
- Gawri language
- Gavri, a drama tradition from Rajasthan, India
