= Ghauri =

Ghauri, Ghori, Ghouri, or Ghuri may refer to:

== People with the surname ==
=== Ghauri ===
- Babar Khan Ghauri, politician from Karachi, Sindh, Pakistan
- Dilawar Khan Ghauri, governor of the Malwa province of central India during the decline of the Delhi Sultanate
- Mohammed Sultan Khan Ghauri, biologist specialist of Homoptera
- Nadeem Ghauri (born 1962), Pakistani cricketer
- Yasmeen Ghauri (born 1971), Pakistani-Canadian supermodel

=== Ghori ===
- Ashraf Ghori (born 1973), Dubai-based Indian comic book artist, filmmaker and entrepreneur
- Ghiyath al-Din Muhammad (1140–1203), Ghurid ruler
- Muhammad of Ghor (1162–1206), most prominent ruler of the Ghurid dynasty

=== Ghouri ===
- Aziz al-Hasan Ghouri (1884–1944), Indian poet
- Zulfiqar Ghouri, Pakistani politician

=== Ghuri ===
- Jamshid Qarin Ghuri, military governor the city of Sari in Iran under Timur
- Al-Ashraf Qansuh al-Ghuri (1441/1446–1516), Mamluk ruler of Egypt
- Emil Ghuri (1907–1984), Palestinian politician

== Other uses ==
- Ghauri (missile), a medium-range ballistic missile of Pakistan
- Ghori pathans, Pashtun tribe
- Ghori, Azad Kashmir or Kahori, a small town in Pakistan
- Ghoris, residents of Ghor Province, Afghanistan
- Ghori (story), a 1948 story by Indian writer Premendra Mitra
- Gori River, in Uttarakhand, India

== See also ==
- Gori (disambiguation)
- Ghurid dynasty, the former rulers in parts of Afghanistan, Pakistan and India
- Ghoria disambiguation
- List of governors of Ghor, Afghanistan
- Ghor University
