= Gouri =

Gouri may refer to:

== People ==
- Gouri Chindarkar (born 1996), involved in the Self Organised Learning Environment
- Gouri Choudhury (born 1964), Bangladeshi singer and music teacher
- Gouri Dharmapal, Indian poet
- Gouri Sankar Bandyopadhyay (born 1962), Indian researcher
- Gouri Sankar Dutta, Indian Politician
- Haim Gouri (1923–2018), Israeli poet, novelist, journalist, and documentary filmmaker
- Juloori Gouri Shankar, Indian writer

== Places ==
- Gouri, Burkina Faso

== See also ==
- Gauri (disambiguation)
- Gori (disambiguation)
- Gaur (disambiguation)
