= Gori =

Gori may refer to:

== Places ==
- Gori, Burkina Faso
- Gori, Chad
- Gori, Georgia
  - Gori District, Georgia
- Gori shola, India
- Gori River, India
- Lake Gori, Iran
- Gori, Benin

== History ==
- Goguryeo, also called Gori
- Goryeo, also called Gori
- Takri Kingdom, also called Gori

== People ==
- Gori (surname)
- Gori (comedian) (born 1972), stage name of the Japanese comedian Toshiyuki Teruya
- Gori, bass guitarist in the Japanese rock band Back-On
- Gori, a short form for Gorilla, used as a nickname in Japan, in both well-meaning and derogatory ways depending on context
- Gori (actress), Pakistani former actress.
- Gori (footballer) (born 2002), Spanish footballer

== Music and entertainment ==
- Gori (album), a 2002 album by A Band of Boys
- Gori: Cuddly Carnage, a 2024 video game by Angry Demon Studio

== See also ==
- Gauri (disambiguation)
- Gouri (disambiguation)
- Gory (disambiguation)
- Gora (disambiguation)
- Ghori (disambiguation)
- Jouri, an Arabic female name
