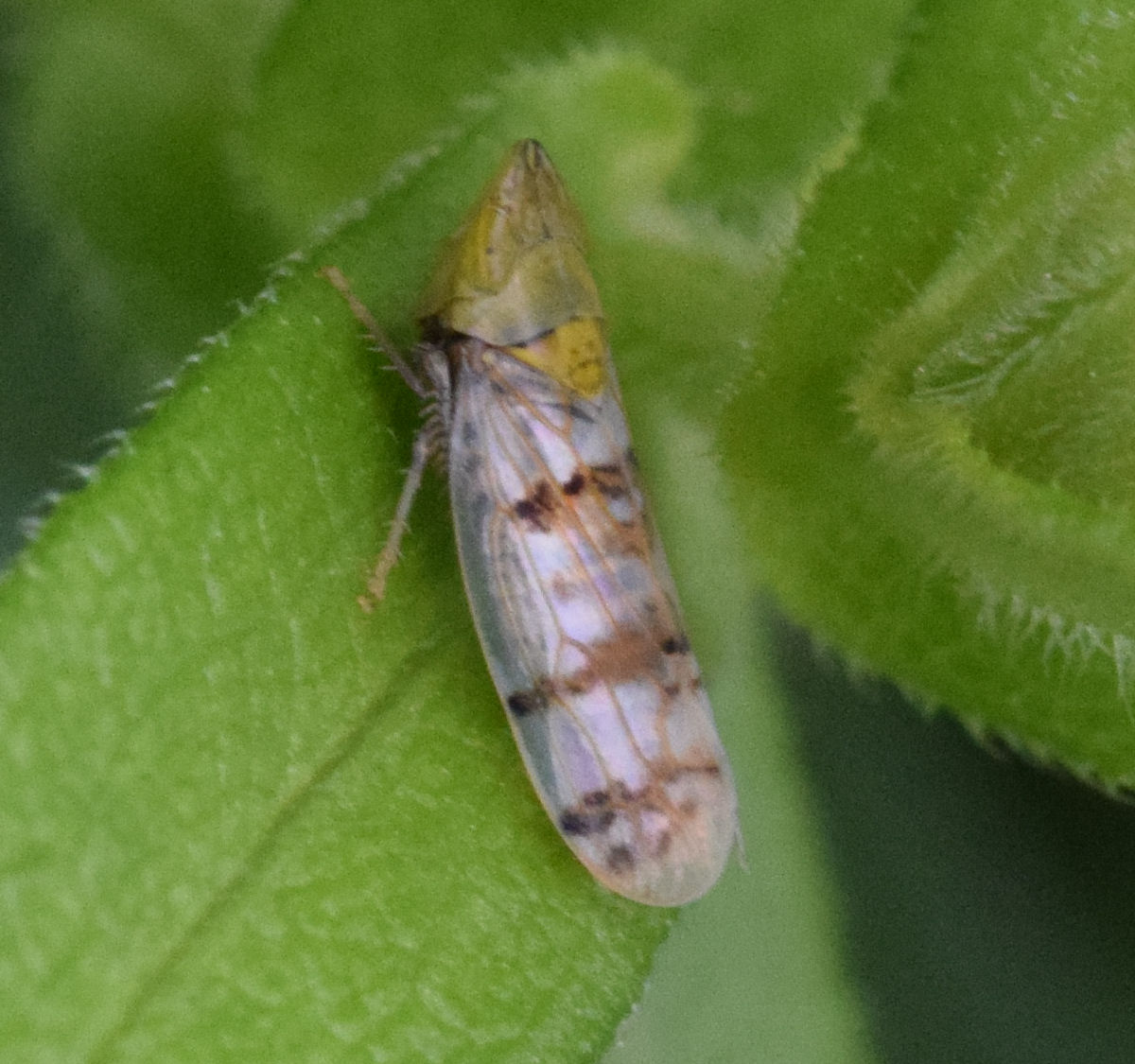
- Specimen from Cambridge, England

Scientific classification
- Kingdom: Animalia
- Phylum: Arthropoda
- Class: Insecta
- Order: Hemiptera
- Suborder: Auchenorrhyncha
- Family: Cicadellidae
- Subfamily: Deltocephalinae
- Tribe: Scaphytopiini
- Genus: Japananus
- Species: J. hyalinus

Binomial name
- Japananus hyalinus (Osborn, 1900)

Synonyms
- Platymetopius hyalinus Osborn, 1900; Platymetopius cinctus Matsumura, 1914; Japananus meridionalis Bonfils, 1981

= Japananus hyalinus =

Species of true bug

Japananus hyalinus, the Japanese maple leafhopper, is a species of leafhopper of the subfamily Deltocephalinae and tribe Opsiini (formerly placed in tribe Scaphytopiini). Believed to be native to eastern Asia, it has been carried with the trade in cultivated maples and is now widely found in Europe, North America and Australia.

== Description ==
Female 5.5 mm long (even 6.5 mm), male 4.25 mm. Head comes to an acute point, head and prothorax greenish yellow. Forewings translucent with reddish veins (paler in male). In the resting position three narrow beaded bands of purplish brown run more or less straight across the wings, incorporating some portions of the veins.

The eggs are inserted into the nodes of young branches, making them very difficult to detect in dormant planting stock. There is normally one generation per year (two in Italy), with the eggs over wintering. The nymphs are sharply pointed at both head and tail and are frequently yellowish.

== Origin and spread ==
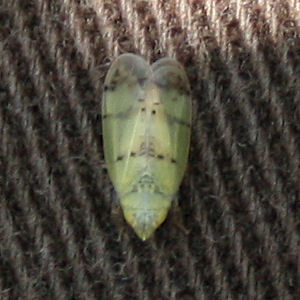
Specimen from Portage, Michigan, United States

The species was first described (as Platymetopius hyalinus) by Herbert Osborn in 1900, from specimens taken in Washington, D.C. Since it was unlikely that a native species would have remained undetected so long, he suggested it was an introduced species brought in with exotic plants. This was confirmed in 1931 when P. W. Oman identified Platymetopius hyalinus with P. cinctus, described by Shōnen Matsumura in 1914 and found in Hokkaido, Honshu and Kyushu.

In 1931 Elmer Darwin Ball designated P. hyalinus as the type (and, at the time, only) species of a newly differentiated genus Japananus. Since then a further five species have been placed in this genus. Apart from hyalinus they are all native to mainland Asia and show no tendency to major range expansions.

In North America J. hyalinus has been recorded from North Carolina in the south to Ontario in the north. The first European records, from Austria and Romania, were published in 1961, followed by reports from Germany, the former Czechoslovakia and Yugoslavia (1987), Bulgaria and Hungary (1989), France, Spain and northern Italy (1994), Slovenia (2002), Serbia and southern Russia (2003), Luxembourg (2010) and Poland (2012). It was discovered in Australia in 1997.

The status of J. hyalinus in the United Kingdom is currently uncertain. In 1999 two insects were found during inspections of imported Acer palmatum stock that originated from South Korea. In August 2014 the insect seen in the taxobox above was photographed in Cambridge, where the complete breeding cycle has been observed.

== Host plants ==
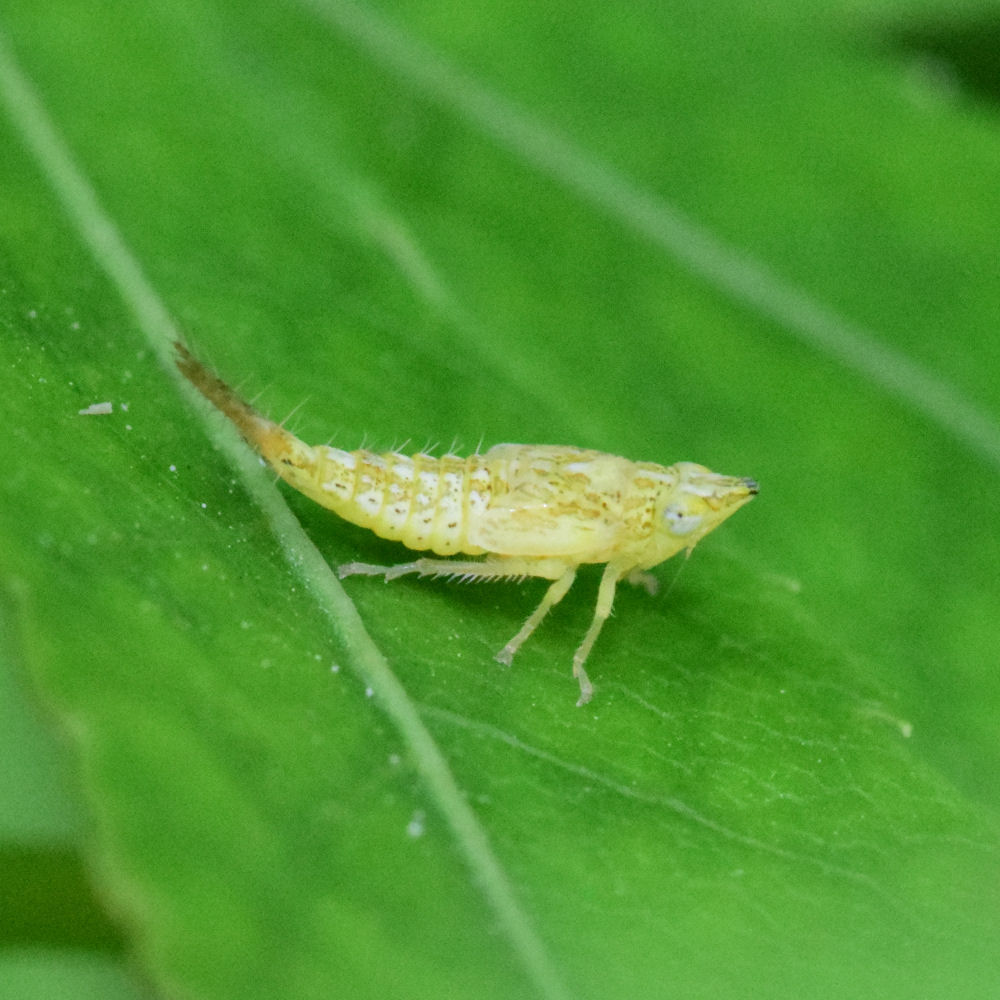
Nymph

In its Asian home range the host plants are Acer japonicum and A. palmatum. In other places it readily adapts to other maple species, which no doubt assists its spread. In Europe the main food plant is field maple (Acer campestre), and it has been recorded from box elder, Norway maple, sycamore, silver maple, Montpellier maple, Acer buergerianum, A. truncatum and red maple.

== Economic impact ==
Leafhoppers are regarded with some suspicion by plant growers, both because of the additional load they place on plant metabolism and their ability to act as vectors for virus diseases and phytoplasma diseases such as flavescence dorée (FD). As of 2014 J. hyalinus is not known to be a disease vector and its potential to cause significant damage is assessed as very small.
