= Gowri =

Gowri may refer to

- Parvati, a Hindu goddess
- Gowri (given name), an Indian female name
- Gowri (1963 film), an Indian Kannada film
- Gowri (2004 film), an Indian Telugu film
- Gowri (2024 film), Kannada-language musical film
- Gowri, Fars, a village in Iran
- Gowri, Iran (disambiguation)

== See also ==
- Gauri (disambiguation)
