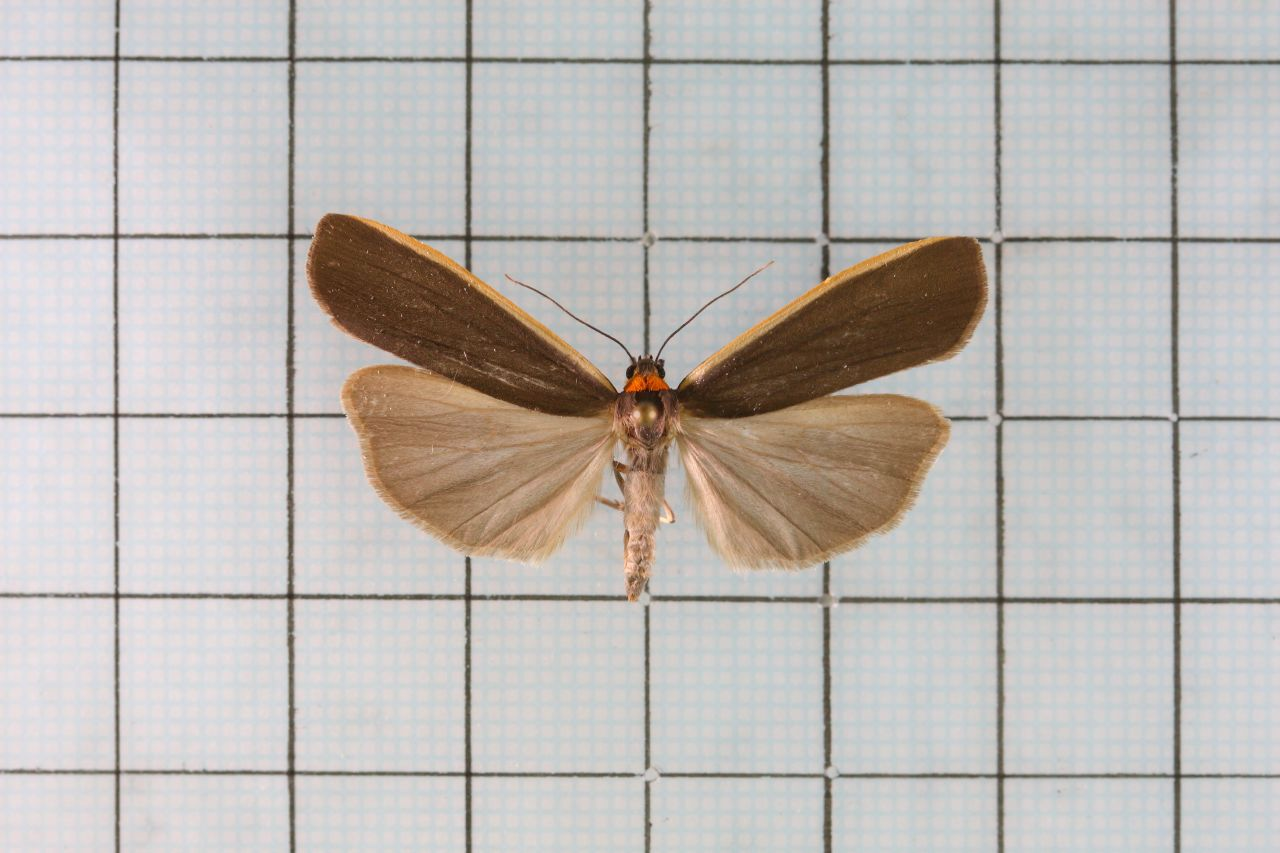

Scientific classification
- Domain: Eukaryota
- Kingdom: Animalia
- Phylum: Arthropoda
- Class: Insecta
- Order: Lepidoptera
- Superfamily: Noctuoidea
- Family: Erebidae
- Subfamily: Arctiinae
- Genus: Ghoria
- Species: G. subpurpurea

Binomial name
- Ghoria subpurpurea (Matsumura, 1927)

Synonyms
- Agylla subpurpurea Matsumura, 1927; Agylla collitoides subpurpurea; Agylla collitoides taiwana Inoue, 1982 (nec Wileman)

= Ghoria subpurpurea =

Species of moth

Ghoria subpurpurea is a moth in the family Erebidae. It is found in Taiwan.

== Taxonomy ==
Ghoria Subpurpurea was treated as a subspecies Ghoria collitoides for some time.
