= List of Scaphytopius species =

This is a list of 175 species in Scaphytopius, a genus of leafhoppers in the family Cicadellidae.

== Scaphytopius species ==
- Scaphytopius abbreviatus DeLong 1916^{c g}
- Scaphytopius abutus DeLong 1980^{c g}
- Scaphytopius acuminatus DeLong 1943^{c g}
- Scaphytopius acutus (Say, 1830)^{c g b} (sharp-nosed leafhopper)
- Scaphytopius aequinoctialis Van Duzee 1933^{c g}
- Scaphytopius aequus DeLong 1943^{c g}
- Scaphytopius alas DeLong 1943^{c g}
- Scaphytopius albascutellus Caldwell 1952^{c g}
- Scaphytopius albifrons Hepner 1946^{c g}
- Scaphytopius albocephalus DeLong 1943^{c g}
- Scaphytopius albocinctus DeLong 1943^{c g}
- Scaphytopius albolutescens Zanol 2000^{c g}
- Scaphytopius albomarginatus DeLong 1943^{c g}
- Scaphytopius altus DeLong 1944^{c g}
- Scaphytopius amazonicus Zanol 2000^{c g}
- Scaphytopius amplinotus Hepner 1946^{c g}
- Scaphytopius anadamus DeLong 1943^{c g}
- Scaphytopius analis Van Duzee 1923^{c g}
- Scaphytopius andromus Ball 1931^{c g}
- Scaphytopius angustatus (Osborn, 1905)^{c g b}
- Scaphytopius anisacanus Ball 1931^{c g}
- Scaphytopius anticus Stål 1862^{c g}
- Scaphytopius apertus DeLong 1943^{c g}
- Scaphytopius appendiculatus Zanol 2000^{c g}
- Scaphytopius arcuatus DeLong 1944^{c g}
- Scaphytopius argutus (DeLong, 1945)^{c g b}
- Scaphytopius atrafrons DeLong 1943^{c g}
- Scaphytopius atrifrons DeLong & Linnavuori 1978^{c g}
- Scaphytopius barroensis Linnavuori & DeLong 1978^{c g}
- Scaphytopius bifidellus DeLong & Linnavuori 1978^{c g}
- Scaphytopius biflavus Cwikla & Freytag 1982^{c g}
- Scaphytopius bolivianus Oman 1938^{c g}
- Scaphytopius brevis Van Duzee 1907^{c g}
- Scaphytopius brunneus Hepner 1946^{c g}
- Scaphytopius caldwelli DeLong 1943^{c g}
- Scaphytopius californiensis Hepner 1946^{c g}
- Scaphytopius calliandrus Ball 1931^{c g}
- Scaphytopius campester DeLong 1943^{c g}
- Scaphytopius canus Hepner 1946^{c g}
- Scaphytopius carasensis Linnavuori & Heller 1961^{c g}
- Scaphytopius carenatus Zanol 2000^{c g}
- Scaphytopius celtidis Ball 1931^{c g}
- Scaphytopius chiquitanus Linnavuori & DeLong 1978^{c g}
- Scaphytopius cinctus DeLong 1943^{c g}
- Scaphytopius cinereus Osborn & Ball 1897^{c g}
- Scaphytopius cinnamoneus (Osborn, 1915)^{b}
- Scaphytopius collaris Sanders & DeLong 1919^{c g}
- Scaphytopius contractus Hepner 1946^{c g}
- Scaphytopius cornutus DeLong 1944^{c g}
- Scaphytopius cruzianus Metcalf 1967^{c g}
- Scaphytopius cumbresus Linnavuori & DeLong 1978^{c g}
- Scaphytopius curtus DeLong 1944^{c g}
- Scaphytopius delongi McKamey & Hicks 2007^{c g}
- Scaphytopius deltensis Hepner 1946^{c g}
- Scaphytopius desertanus Ball, 1931^{c g b}
- Scaphytopius diabolus Van Duzee 1925^{c g}
- Scaphytopius dilatus DeLong 1944^{c g}
- Scaphytopius divisus DeLong 1944^{c g}
- Scaphytopius dodonanus Ball 1931^{c g}
- Scaphytopius dorsalis Ball 1909^{c g}
- Scaphytopius dubius Van Duzee 1910^{c g}
- Scaphytopius duocolorus DeLong 1943^{c g}
- Scaphytopius eburneus Zanol 2000^{c g}
- Scaphytopius elegans ^{b}
- Scaphytopius elongatus DeLong 1944^{c g}
- Scaphytopius expansus Linnavuori & Heller 1961^{c g}
- Scaphytopius falcatus DeLong 1943^{c g}
- Scaphytopius fasciatus DeLong 1944^{c g}
- Scaphytopius ferruginosus Zanol 2000^{c g}
- Scaphytopius flavens DeLong 1943^{c g}
- Scaphytopius flavifrons Hepner 1946^{c g}
- Scaphytopius fluxus DeLong 1943^{c g}
- Scaphytopius frontalis Van Duzee, 1890^{c g b} (yellowfaced leafhopper)
- Scaphytopius fuliginosus Osborn 1923^{c g}
- Scaphytopius fulvostriatus Linnavuori 1959^{c g}
- Scaphytopius fulvus (Osborn, 1905)^{c g b}
- Scaphytopius furcifer Linnavuori 1959^{c g}
- Scaphytopius fuscicephalus Hepner 1946^{c g}
- Scaphytopius fuscifrons Van Duzee 1894^{c g}
- Scaphytopius goodi DeLong 1943^{c g}
- Scaphytopius graneticus Ball 1931^{c g}
- Scaphytopius guterranus Ball 1931^{c g}
- Scaphytopius hambletoni DeLong 1944^{c g}
- Scaphytopius hebatus DeLong 1943^{c g}
- Scaphytopius heldoranus Ball 1931^{c g}
- Scaphytopius hilaris Linnavuori 1959^{c g}
- Scaphytopius hymenocleae Van Duzee 1923^{c g}
- Scaphytopius iadmon Linnavuori 1973^{c g}
- Scaphytopius insolitus Hepner 1946^{c g}
- Scaphytopius irroratus Van Duzee 1910^{c g}
- Scaphytopius irrorellus DeLong 1944^{c g}
- Scaphytopius isabellinus Zanol 2000^{c g}
- Scaphytopius jandacephalus Caldwell 1952^{c g}
- Scaphytopius jocosus Van Duzee 1923^{c g}
- Scaphytopius labellus DeLong 1980^{c g}
- Scaphytopius latens DeLong 1943^{c g}
- Scaphytopius latidens DeLong 1944^{c g}
- Scaphytopius latus (Baker, 1900)^{c g b}
- Scaphytopius limbatus Osborn 1926^{c g}
- Scaphytopius limbramentus DeLong 1943^{c g}
- Scaphytopius lineacephalus Caldwell 1952^{c g}
- Scaphytopius lineafrons DeLong 1943^{c g}
- Scaphytopius lineus DeLong & Linnavuori 1978^{c g}
- Scaphytopius linnavuorii McKamey&Hicks2007^{c g}
- Scaphytopius loricatus (Van Duzee, 1894)^{i c g}
- Scaphytopius lumenotus DeLong 1943^{c g}
- Scaphytopius luteus DeLong 1944^{c g}
- Scaphytopius maculosus DeLong 1944^{c g}
- Scaphytopius magdalensis Provancher, 1889^{c g b} (blueberry leafhopper)
- Scaphytopius majestus (Ball, 1909)^{b}
- Scaphytopius marginelineatus Stål 1859^{c g}
- Scaphytopius marginellus DeLong 1944^{c g}
- Scaphytopius marginifrons DeLong 1943^{c g}
- Scaphytopius meridianus Hepner 1946^{c g}
- Scaphytopius modicus Hepner 1946^{c g}
- Scaphytopius monticolus DeLong 1944^{c g}
- Scaphytopius nanus Van Duzee 1907^{c g}
- Scaphytopius nasutus Van Duzee 1907^{c g}
- Scaphytopius neloricatus Caldwell 1952^{c g}
- Scaphytopius nigricollis Ball, 1916^{c g b}
- Scaphytopius nigrifrons DeLong, 1923^{c g b}
- Scaphytopius nigrinotus Caldwell 1952^{c g}
- Scaphytopius nigriviridis Ball 1909^{c g}
- Scaphytopius nitridus DeLong 1943^{c g}
- Scaphytopius obajuba Zanol 2000^{c g}
- Scaphytopius obatubira Zanol 2000^{c g}
- Scaphytopius oinomaos Linnavuori 1973^{c g}
- Scaphytopius oregonensis (Baker, 1900)^{c g b}
- Scaphytopius osborni Van Duzee 1910^{c g}
- Scaphytopius pallescens Linnavuori & DeLong 1979^{c g}
- Scaphytopius pallidicapitatus Hepner 1946^{c g}
- Scaphytopius pallidiscutus Hepner 1946^{c g}
- Scaphytopius pallidus DeLong 1944^{c g}
- Scaphytopius paraguayensis Cheng 1980^{c g}
- Scaphytopius parallelus DeLong 1943^{c g}
- Scaphytopius paulistanus Zanol 2000^{c g}
- Scaphytopius pennatus Hepner 1946^{c g}
- Scaphytopius peruigua Zanol 2000^{c g}
- Scaphytopius picturata Osborn 1924^{c g}
- Scaphytopius piperatus DeLong 1943^{c g}
- Scaphytopius plummeri DeLong 1943^{c g}
- Scaphytopius quinquenotus DeLong 1943^{c g}
- Scaphytopius radiatus Hepner 1946^{c g}
- Scaphytopius retusus Van Duzee 1937^{c g}
- Scaphytopius rotundiceps Linnavuori 1959^{c g}
- Scaphytopius rubellus Sanders & DeLong, 1919^{c g b}
- Scaphytopius rubidus DeLong 1980^{c g}
- Scaphytopius rubranotus DeLong 1944^{c g}
- Scaphytopius saginatus Linnavuori 1959^{c g}
- Scaphytopius schuezi Linnavuori & Heller 1961^{c g}
- Scaphytopius scriptus Ball 1909^{c g}
- Scaphytopius scutellatus Van Duzee 1923^{c g}
- Scaphytopius serratus DeLong 1943^{c g}
- Scaphytopius serrellus DeLong 1944^{c g}
- Scaphytopius slossoni Van Duzee 1910^{c g}
- Scaphytopius spadix DeLong 1943^{c g}
- Scaphytopius speciosus Van Duzee 1923^{c g}
- Scaphytopius spinosus DeLong & Linnavuori 1978^{c g}
- Scaphytopius stonei DeLong 1943^{c g}
- Scaphytopius subniger DeLong 1943^{c g}
- Scaphytopius sulphureus Osborn 1923^{c g}
- Scaphytopius thea Linnavuori & DeLong 1979^{c g}
- Scaphytopius torridus Ball 1916^{c g}
- Scaphytopius transversalis Linnavuori 1959^{c g}
- Scaphytopius triangularis DeLong, 1945^{c g b}
- Scaphytopius trilineatus Ball 1916^{c g}
- Scaphytopius tripunctatus DeLong 1943^{c g}
- Scaphytopius utahensis Hepner 1946^{c g}
- Scaphytopius verecundus Van Duzee, 1910^{c g b}
- Scaphytopius vermiculatus DeLong 1943^{c g}
- Scaphytopius vinculatus Linnavuori & DeLong 1978^{c g}
- Scaphytopius vinculus DeLong 1943^{c g}
- Scaphytopius virescens Zanol 2000^{c g}
- Scaphytopius viridicephalus Hepner 1946^{c g}
- Scaphytopius vittifrons Hepner 1946^{c g}

Data sources: i = ITIS, c = Catalogue of Life, g = GBIF, b = Bugguide.net
