= Orosius (disambiguation) =

Orosius (Paulus Orosius, b. c. 375, d. 418?) was a Christian historian, theologian and student of Augustine of Hippo from Gallaecia.

Orosius may also refer to:

- Orosius (leafhopper), a bug genus in the family Cicadellidae
- Bobbio Orosius, an early 7th-century manuscript of the Chronicon by Paulus Orosius

== See also ==
- List of Roman cognomina
