= Pramod Singh =

Indian politician

Member of Legislative Assembly
- Preceded by: Shakir Ali
- Constituency: Gauri Bazaar (now: Deoria)

Personal details
- Party: BJP
- Children: 3
- Occupation: Politician

Pramod Singh is an Indian politician from Deoria district who won a legislative election in 2007 in the Gauri Bazar constituency of Deoria district, Uttar Pradesh. He defeated Minister Shakir Ali by a margin of nearly 15,000 votes. In April 2009, Singh disrupted an election in Sopari Bazar village, accusing supporters of opposition parties of fraudulent voting.

During the Mayawati administration, he became an important politician of eastern Uttar Pradesh. He joined BJP in 2015.
