= Gorrini =

Gorrini is an Italian surname. Notable people with the surname include:

- Giacomo Gorrini (1859–1950), Italian diplomat and historian
- Luigi Gorrini (1917–2014), Italian World War II fighter pilot

== See also ==
- Gori (disambiguation)
