= Guri (disambiguation) =

Guri is a city in South Korea. It may also refer to:

== People ==
- Guri or Gurri is an alternative spelling for Koori, a demonym for Aboriginal Australians in south-eastern Australia
- Guri (singer), Indian singer and actor associated with Punjabi music and Punjabi cinema
- Guri Schanke, Norwegian actress and singer
- Guri, a nickname for Tibetan activist Jigme Gyatso
- Guri, a character in Star Wars: Shadows of the Empire

== Places ==
- Guri, a village in Walta (Dogu'a Tembien), Ethiopia
- Guri Dam, a dam in Venezuela
- Guri, Nigeria, a Local Government Area of Jigawa State
- Gowri, Fars, a village in Farashband County, Fars Province, Iran
- Guri, Hormozgan, a village in Qeshm County, Hormozgan Province, Iran
- Guri, Kermanshah, a village in Javanrud County, Kermanshah Province, Iran
- Guri, Khuzestan, a village in Masjed Soleyman County, Khuzestan Province, Iran
- Guri, Kohgiluyeh and Boyer-Ahmad, a village in Kohgiluyeh County, Kohgiluyeh and Boyer-Ahmad Province, Iran
- Guri, Chenaran, a village in Chenaran County, Razavi Khorasan Province, Iran
- Guri, Joghatai, a village in Joghatai County, Razavi Khorasan Province, Iran

== Other uses ==
- All pages beginning with guri
- BAaer BA-5 Gurí, an Argentine ultralight aircraft
- Guri (1986 film), a Kannada-language film
- Guri (2004 film), a Telugu-language film
- Guri-guri, a type of sherbet made by the shop Tasaka Guri-Guri
