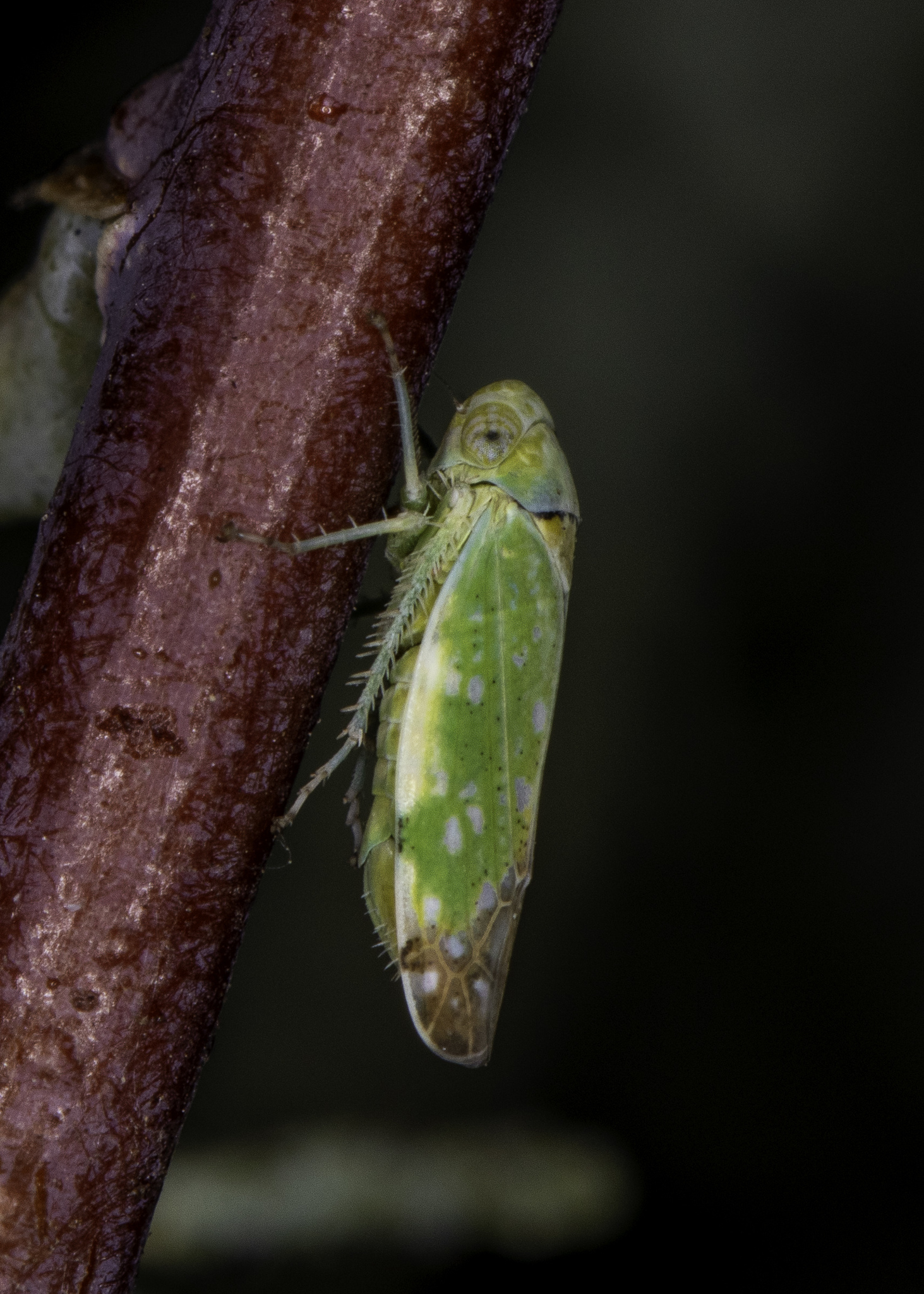

Scientific classification
- Kingdom: Animalia
- Phylum: Arthropoda
- Class: Insecta
- Order: Hemiptera
- Suborder: Auchenorrhyncha
- Family: Cicadellidae
- Tribe: Opsiini
- Genus: Opsius
- Species: O. stactogalus

Binomial name
- Opsius stactogalus Fieber, 1866

Synonyms
- Tamarix jassid Insects Of Hawaii, 4, 5

= Opsius stactogalus =

Species of true bug

Opsius stactogalus, the tamarix leafhopper, is a species of leafhopper in the family Cicadellidae. It is found in Europe and Africa.
