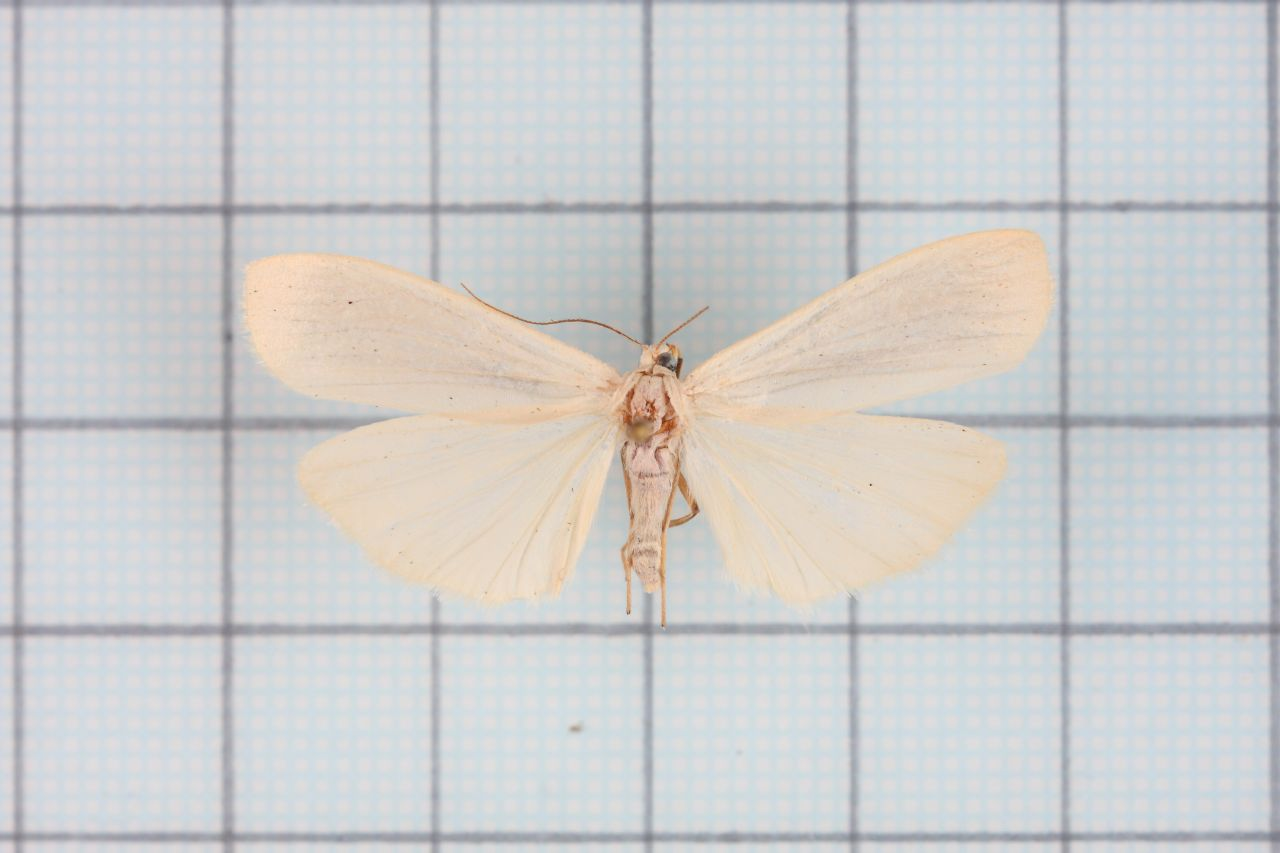

Scientific classification
- Domain: Eukaryota
- Kingdom: Animalia
- Phylum: Arthropoda
- Class: Insecta
- Order: Lepidoptera
- Superfamily: Noctuoidea
- Family: Erebidae
- Subfamily: Arctiinae
- Genus: Ghoria
- Species: G. tecta

Binomial name
- Ghoria tecta (Wileman, 1910)

Synonyms
- Eilema tecta Wileman, 1910

= Ghoria tecta =

Species of moth

Ghoria tecta is a moth of the family Erebidae described by Alfred Ernest Wileman in 1910. It is found in Taiwan. It was transferred from Eilema into Ghoria by Vladimir Viktorovitch Dubatolov et al. in 2012.
