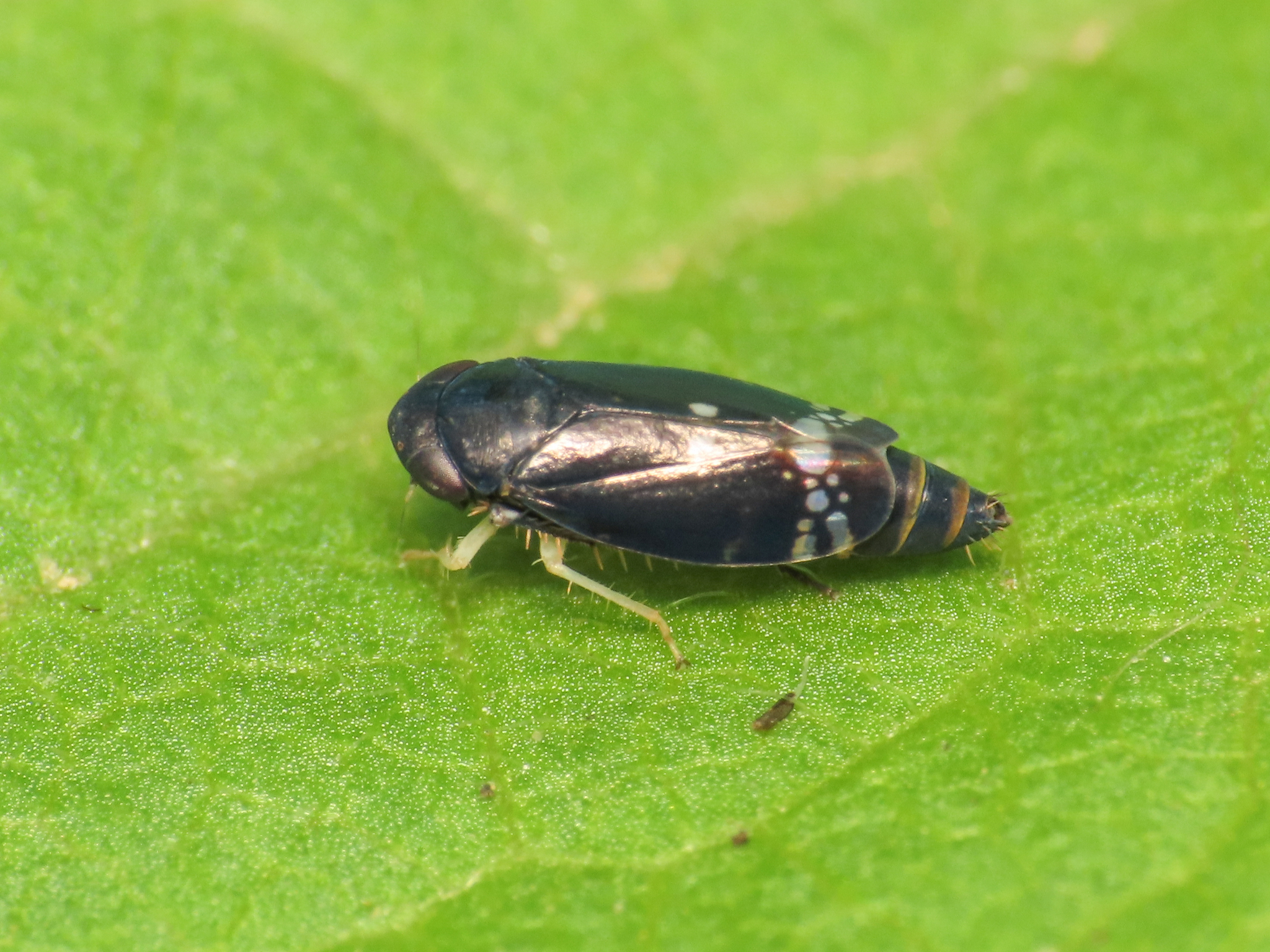
- Neoaliturus fenestratus, Italy

Scientific classification
- Domain: Eukaryota
- Kingdom: Animalia
- Phylum: Arthropoda
- Class: Insecta
- Order: Hemiptera
- Suborder: Auchenorrhyncha
- Family: Cicadellidae
- Subfamily: Deltocephalinae
- Tribe: Opsiini
- Subtribe: Circuliferina
- Genus: Neoaliturus; Distant, 1918

Subgenera
- Alituriscus Emeljanov, 1999; Circulifer Zakhvatkin, 1935; Neoaliturus Distant, 1918

Synonyms
- Aliturus Distant, 1908; Bothrognathus Bergroth, 1920; Distomotettix Ribaut, 1938

= Neoaliturus =

Genus of leafhoppers

Neoaliturus is a genus of leafhoppers in the tribe Opsiini and the subfamily Deltocephalinae. There are more than 30 described species in Neoaliturus.

== Species ==
These 33 species belong to the genus Neoaliturus.

Subgenus Alituriscus Emeljanov, 1999
Neoaliturus decemocellatus Dlabola, 1987
Subgenus Circulifer Zakhvatkin, 1935
Neoaliturus alboflavovittatus (Lindberg, 1954)
Neoaliturus arabicus (Zakhvatkin, 1946)
Neoaliturus chinai (Zakhvatkin, 1946)
Neoaliturus curtus (Linnavuori, 1955)
Neoaliturus dubiosus (Matsumura, 1908)
Neoaliturus haematoceps (Mulsant & Rey, 1855)
Neoaliturus jenjouriste (Zakhvatkin, 1946)
Neoaliturus karrooensis (Cogan, 1916)
Neoaliturus obscurinervis (Lindberg, 1958)
Neoaliturus obtusiceps (Linnavuori, 1961)
Neoaliturus opacipennis (Lethierry, 1876)
Neoaliturus pentzia (Cogan, 1916)
Neoaliturus tenellus (Baker, 1896)
Neoaliturus xinjiangensis (Cai, 1998)
Subgenus Neoaliturus Distant, 1918
Neoaliturus fenestratus (Herrich-Schäffer, 1834)
Neoaliturus grandidentis Gnezdilov, 2022
Neoaliturus guttulatus (Kirschbaum, 1868)
Neoaliturus hui (Chang, 1938)
Subgenus Unassigned
Neoaliturus alabangensis (Merino, 1936)
Neoaliturus albilacustris Tishechkin, 2021
Neoaliturus alboguttatus (Lethierry, 1874)
Neoaliturus angulatus (Naudé, 1926)
Neoaliturus argillaceus Mitjaev, 1975
Neoaliturus carbonarius Mitjaev, 1971
Neoaliturus dubovskii Tishechkin, 2021
Neoaliturus hispaniae (Young & Frazier, 1954)
Neoaliturus inscriptus (Haupt, 1927)
Neoaliturus nitidus (Young & Frazier, 1954)
Neoaliturus pulcher (Haupt, 1927)
Neoaliturus rubrivenosus (Scott, 1876)
Neoaliturus translucens Tishechkin, 2021
Neoaliturus unicolor (Melichar, 1902)
