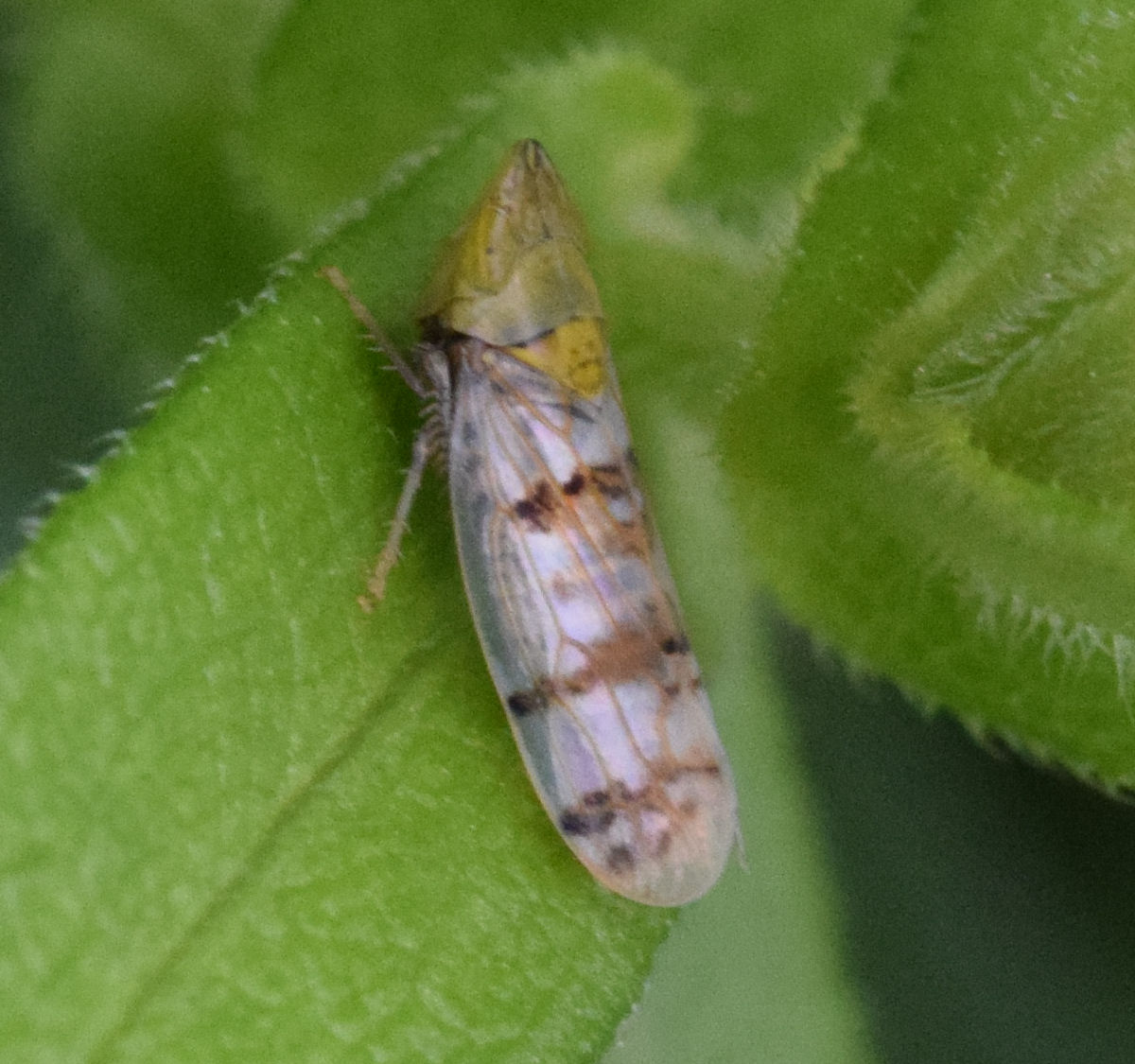
- Japananus hyalinus

Scientific classification
- Kingdom: Animalia
- Phylum: Arthropoda
- Class: Insecta
- Order: Hemiptera
- Suborder: Auchenorrhyncha
- Family: Cicadellidae
- Subfamily: Deltocephalinae
- Tribe: Scaphytopiini
- Genus: Japananus; Ball, 1931

Type species
- Platymetopius hyalinus Osborn, 1900

= Japananus =

Genus of true bugs

Japananus is a genus of leafhoppers of the subfamily Deltocephalinae. Six species are currently placed in the genus, all native to Asia and typically feeding on Acer species. One species, J. hyalinus, has spread throughout the Northern Hemisphere and Australia with the trade in cultivated maples.

== Species ==
- Japananus hyalinus (Osborn, 1900) - cosmopolitan by introduction
- Japananus aceri (Matsumura, 1914) - Japan, Korea, China.
- Japananus nepalicus Viraktamath & Anantha Murthy, 1999 - Nepal
- Japananus bicurvatus Xing, Dai et Li, 2008 - China
- Japananus meilingensis Xing, Dai et Li, 2010 - China
- Japananus lamellosus Xing, Dai et Li, 2010 - China
