= Scaphytopiini =

Scientific classification
- Domain: Eukaryota
- Kingdom: Animalia
- Phylum: Arthropoda
- Class: Insecta
- Order: Hemiptera
- Suborder: Auchenorrhyncha
- Family: Cicadellidae
- Subfamily: Deltocephalinae
- Tribe: Scaphytopiini; Oman, 1943

Tribe of true bugs

Scaphytopiini is an insect tribe of leafhoppers in the subfamily Deltocephalinae. The scope of the tribe was restricted by Zahniser & Dietrich (2013) to include only 3 genera.

== Genera ==
- Ascius DeLong, 1943
- Scaphytopius Ball, 1931
- Tenuarus DeLong, 1944

== Genera transferred out by Zahniser & Dietrich ==
=== Genera now placed in Athysanini ===
- Nesothamnus Linnavuori, 1959
- Scaphytoceps Dlabola, 1957

=== Genera now placed in Cicadulini ===
- Proceps Mulsant & Rey, 1855

=== Genera now placed in Opsiini ===
- Afrascius Linnavuori, 1969
- Japananus Ball, 1931

=== Genera now placed in Scaphoideini ===
- Coroticus Distant, 1918
- Grammacephalus Haupt, 1929
- Sikhamani Viraktamath & Webb, 2006
- Sudhamruta Viraktamath & Anantha Murthy, 1999
- Thryaksha Viraktamath & Anantha Murthy, 1999
- Univagris Viraktamath & Anantha Murthy, 1999

=== Genera now placed in Vartini ===
- Curvimonus Viraktamath & Anantha Murthy, 1999
- Shivania Viraktamath, 2004
- Stymphalus Stål, 1866
- Varta Distant, 1908
- Vartalapa Viraktamath, 2004
- Vartatopa Viraktamath, 2004
- Xenovarta Viraktamath, 2004
