= Ghoria =

Scientific classification
- Domain: Eukaryota
- Kingdom: Animalia
- Phylum: Arthropoda
- Class: Insecta
- Order: Lepidoptera
- Superfamily: Noctuoidea
- Family: Erebidae
- Subfamily: Arctiinae
- Subtribe: Lithosiina
- Genus: Ghoria; Moore, 1878

Genus of moths

Ghoria is a genus of moths in the family Erebidae.

== Species ==
- Ghoria albocinerea Moore, 1878
- Ghoria collitoides Butler, 1885
- Ghoria dirhabdus Rothschild, 1916
- Ghoria gigantea (Oberthür, 1879)
- Ghoria nigripars (Walker, 1856)
- Ghoria subpurpurea (Matsumura, 1927)
- Ghoria tecta (Wileman, 1910)

== See also ==
- Ghauri / Ghori
