= Goris (surname) =

Goris is a Dutch-language surname, originated from the Belgian region of Flanders. Notable people with the surname include:

- Esther Goris (born 1963), Argentine actress
- Nathan Goris (born 1990), Belgian footballer
- René Goris (born 1946), Belgian long-distance runner
- Rob Goris (1982–2012), Belgian road racing cyclist

== See also ==
- Goris, a city in Armenia (not related to this surname)
- Gori (surname)
