= Ghoria gigantea =

Scientific classification
- Kingdom: Animalia
- Phylum: Arthropoda
- Clade: Pancrustacea
- Class: Insecta
- Order: Lepidoptera
- Superfamily: Noctuoidea
- Family: Erebidae
- Subfamily: Arctiinae
- Genus: Ghoria
- Species: G. gigantea

Binomial name
- Ghoria gigantea (Oberthür, 1879)

Synonyms
- Lithosia gigantea Oberthür, 1879; Agylla gigantea; Agylla gigantea chosengylla Bryk, [1949]; Agylla gigantea flavipennis Inoue et Maenami, 1963

Species of moth

Ghoria gigantea is a moth of the family Erebidae. The species was first described by Charles Oberthür in 1879. It is found in the Russian Far East (Amur, Primorye, Sakhalin), China (Kunashir, Heilongjiang, Liaonin, Hebei, Shanxi, Shaanxi, Zhejiang), Korea and Japan.
