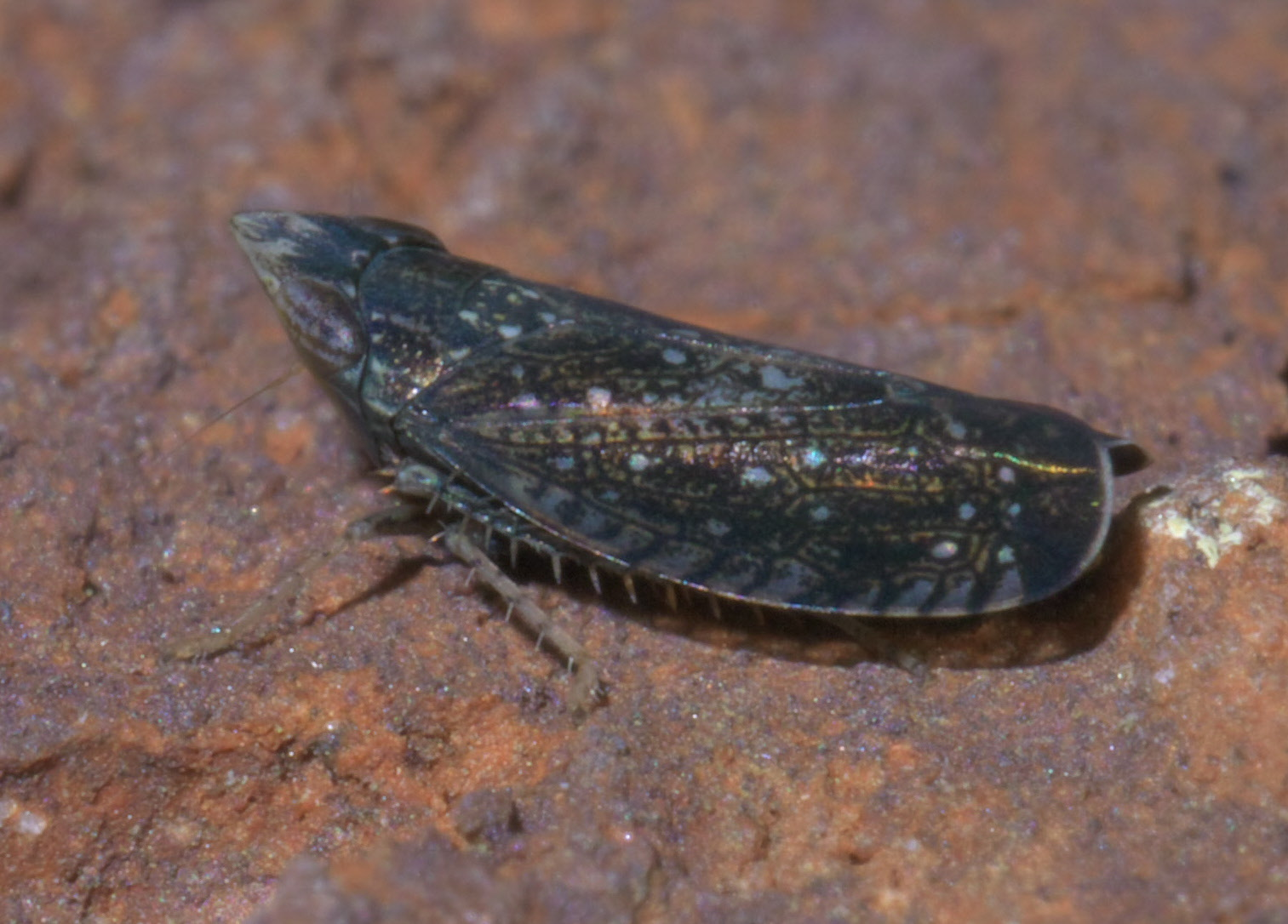

Scientific classification
- Kingdom: Animalia
- Phylum: Arthropoda
- Class: Insecta
- Order: Hemiptera
- Suborder: Auchenorrhyncha
- Family: Cicadellidae
- Genus: Scaphytopius
- Species: S. frontalis

Binomial name
- Scaphytopius frontalis Van Duzee, 1890

= Scaphytopius frontalis =

Species of true bug

Scaphytopius frontalis, the Eastern yellow-faced leafhopper or often just yellowfaced leafhopper, is a species of leafhopper in the family Cicadellidae.

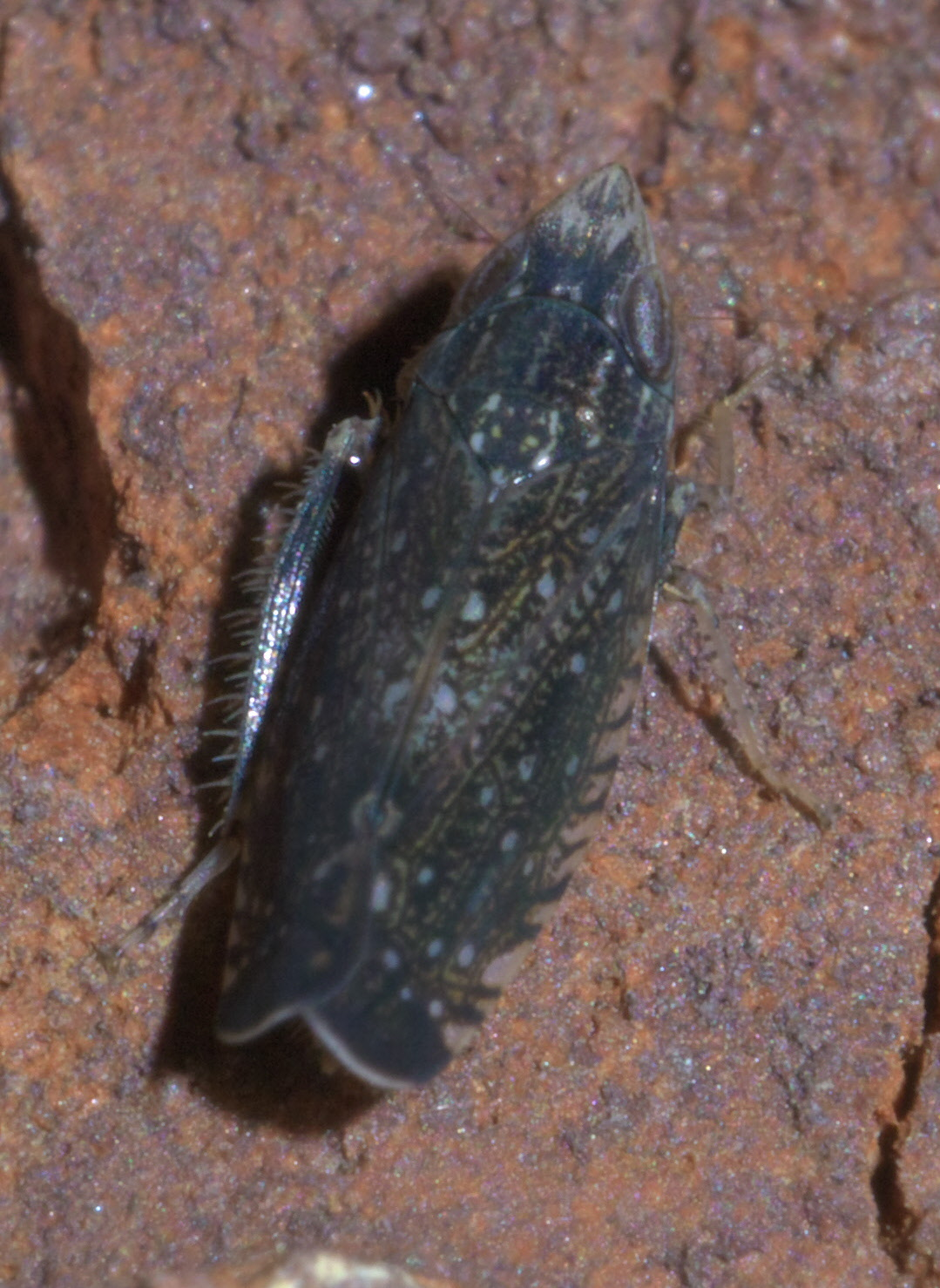
Yellowfaced leafhopper, Scaphytopius frontalis
