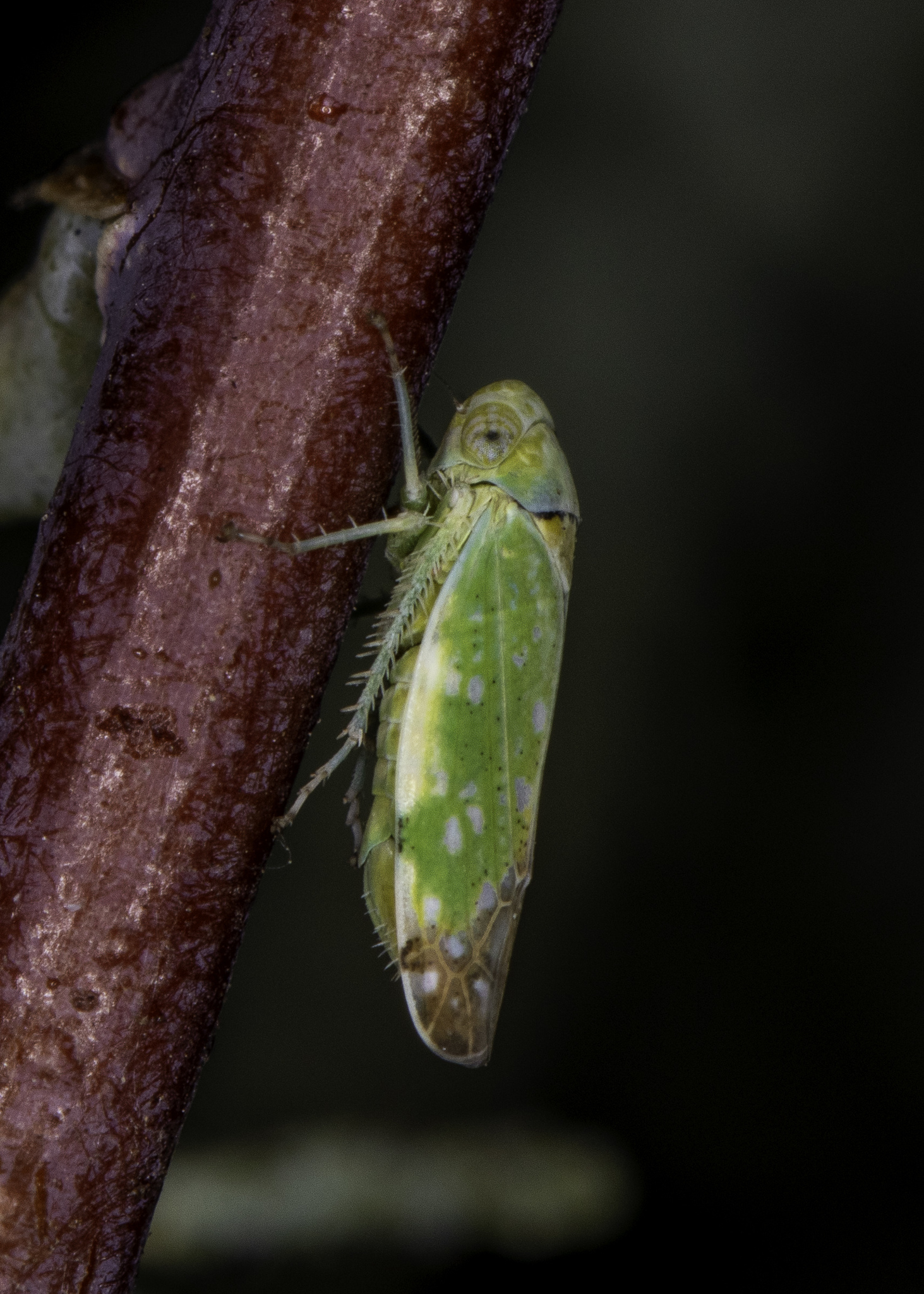
- Opsius stactogalus

Scientific classification
- Domain: Eukaryota
- Kingdom: Animalia
- Phylum: Arthropoda
- Class: Insecta
- Order: Hemiptera
- Suborder: Auchenorrhyncha
- Family: Cicadellidae
- Tribe: Opsiini
- Genus: Opsius; Fieber, 1866

= Opsius =

Genus of insects

Opsius is a genus of leafhoppers in the family Cicadellidae. There are about 19 described species in Opsius.

== Species ==
These 19 species belong to the genus Opsius:

- Opsius confusus Korolevskaya, 1968
- Opsius croaticus Bednarczyk & Gêbicki, 1999
- Opsius cypriacus Lindberg, 1958
- Opsius dicessus (Horvath, 1911)
- Opsius discessus Horváth, 1911
- Opsius draensis Lindberg, 1963
- Opsius euxinus Dlabola, 1965
- Opsius ferganensis Dubovsky, 1966
- Opsius glaucovirens Stål, 1858
- Opsius gorgonum Lindberg, 1958
- Opsius heydeni Lethierry
- Opsius jucundus Lethierry, 1874
- Opsius lethierryi Wagner, 1942
- Opsius pallasi Letheirry, 1874
- Opsius richteri Dlabola, 1960
- Opsius scutellaris Lethierry, 1874
- Opsius smaragdinus Emeljanov, 1964
- Opsius stactogalus Fieber, 1866 (tamarix leafhopper)
- Opsius tigripes (Lethierry, 1876)
