= Gauri (given name) =

- Language: Sanskrit

Origin
- Region of origin: India

Gauri (alternatively Gowri or Gouri) is a given name of India. It is derived from the Sanskrit गौरी (gaurī, 'white, shining, brilliant'), which is used as an epithet of the goddess Parvati, especially in the Mahagauri manifestation.

== List of persons with the name ==
- Gauri Pradhan Tejwani (born 16 September 1964), Indian television actress
- Gauri Shinde, Indian ad-film and feature film director
- Gauri Karnik, Hindi and Marathi film actress
- Gauri Khan, Indian Film Producer and Interior Designer
- Gauri Shankar, Indian chess player and FIDE Master
- Gauri Malla, Nepali actress
- Gauri Ma (1857 – 1938), Indian disciple of Ramakrishna, companion of Sarada Devi
- Gauri Deshpande (1942–2003), novelist, short story writer, and poet from Maharashtra, India
- Gauri Ayyub (1931 – 1998), social worker, activist, writer and teacher based in Kolkata (Calcutta
- Gauri Pradhan, social activist and human rights defender in Nepal as well as in South Asia
- Gauri Shankar Pandey, veteran Indian politician and a former Minister of Bihar
- Protima Gauri (1948 – 1998), Indian model turned odissi exponent
- Gauri Shankar Kalita (1955 – 2010), Indian journalist
- Gauri Shankar Rai, member of the Sixth Lok Sabha during 1977-79 representing Ghazipur constituency of Uttar Pradesh
- Gauri Shankar Shejwar, medical doctor by profession and one of the senior leaders of Bharatiya Janata Party in Madhya Pradesh
- Gauri Shankar Khadka, Nepalese politician, belonging to the Communist Party of Nepal (Maoist)
- Gauri Gokhale (born 1984), Indian cricketer
- Gauri Rani Banerjee, Indian social worker
