= Xerophytacolus =

Scientific classification
- Domain: Eukaryota
- Kingdom: Animalia
- Phylum: Arthropoda
- Class: Insecta
- Order: Hemiptera
- Suborder: Auchenorrhyncha
- Family: Cicadellidae
- Tribe: Opsiini
- Genus: Xerophytacolus; Stiller, 2012

Genus of leafhopper

Xerophytacolus is a genus of Cicadellidae (leafhopper) in the tribe Opsiini and the subfamily Deltocephalinae. It was described in 2012 by Stiller, and is found in southern Africa.

== Species ==
Are there two known species of Xerophytacolus:

- Xerophytacolus claviverpus Stiller, 2012
- Xerophytacolus tubuverpus Stiller, 2012
