= Gowri (given name) =

Gowri is an Indian feminine given name that may refer to the following notable people:

- Gowri Ishwaran, Indian educationist
- Gowri Kirubanandan, Tamil writer
- Gowri Koneswaran, Tamil-American poet and performing artist
- Gowri Krishnan, Indian television actress
- Gowri MN (born 1989), Indian sand artist
- Gowri Lakshmi Bayi (1791–1815), Indian royalty
- Gowri Munjal, Indian actress and model
- Gowri Nandha, Indian actress
- Gowri Parvati Bayi (1802–1853), Indian royalty
- Gowri Rukmini Bayi, 19th century Indian princess
