= Ghoria nigripars =

Scientific classification
- Kingdom: Animalia
- Phylum: Arthropoda
- Class: Insecta
- Order: Lepidoptera
- Superfamily: Noctuoidea
- Family: Erebidae
- Subfamily: Arctiinae
- Genus: Ghoria
- Species: G. nigripars

Binomial name
- Ghoria nigripars (Walker, 1856)

Synonyms
- Lithosia nigripars Walker, 1856; Capissa pallens Moore, 1878

Species of moth

Ghoria nigripars is a moth of the family Erebidae. It is found in eastern India and China (Shaanxi, Zhejiang, Fujian and Guangdong).
