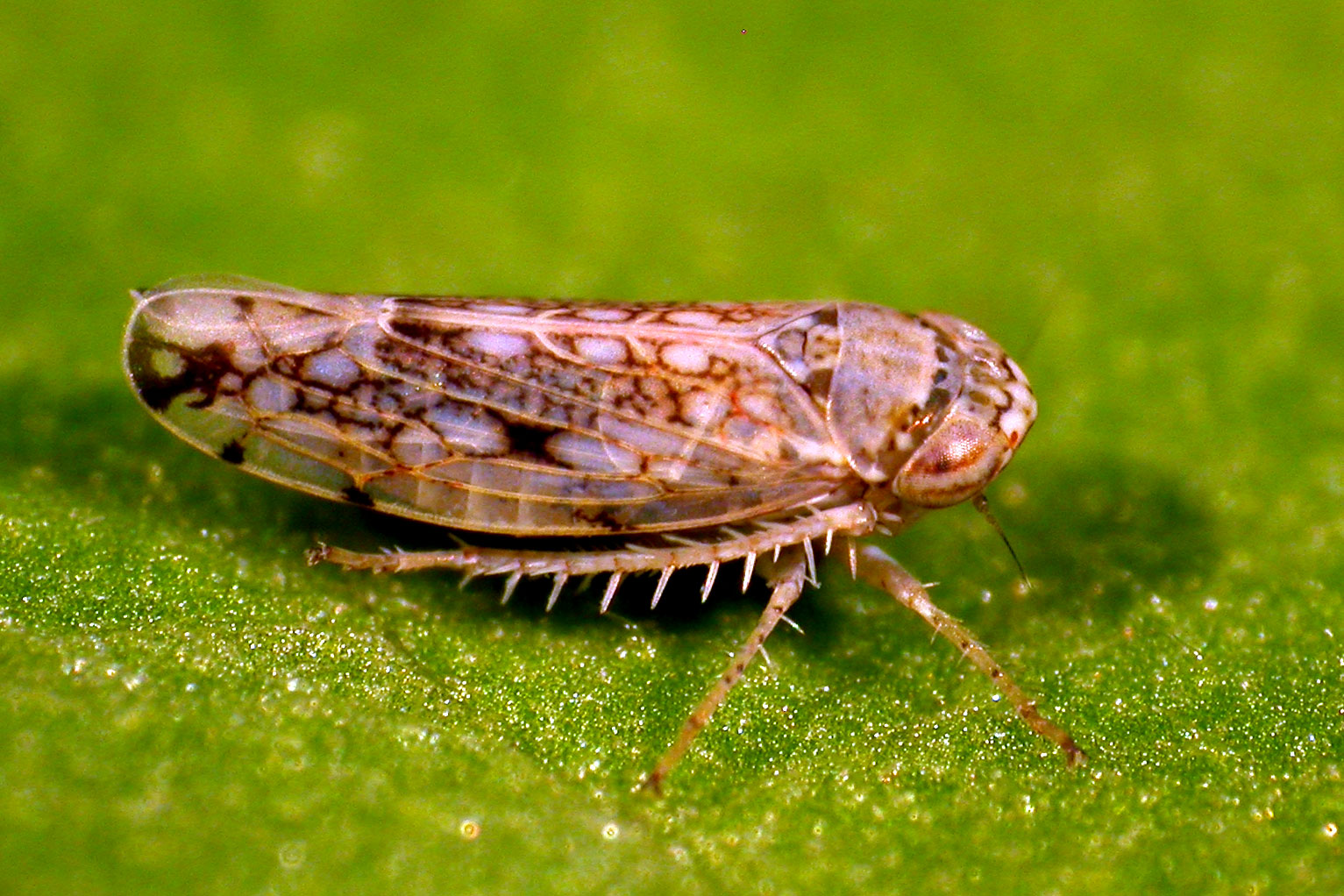
- Orosius orientalis

Scientific classification
- Domain: Eukaryota
- Kingdom: Animalia
- Phylum: Arthropoda
- Class: Insecta
- Order: Hemiptera
- Suborder: Auchenorrhyncha
- Family: Cicadellidae
- Subfamily: Deltocephalinae
- Tribe: Opsiini
- Genus: Orosius; Distant, 1918

Type species
- Orosius albicinctus Distant

Synonyms
- Nesaloha Oman, 1943

= Orosius (leafhopper) =

Genus of leafhoppers

Orosius is a genus of leafhoppers in the family Cicadellidae. There are 15 described species in Orosius.

The genus was revised by Ghauri in 1966. Species can be differentiated by the shape of the aedeagus.

== Species ==
These 15 species belong to the genus Orosius:

- Orosius aegypticus Ghauri, 1966 (Egypt, Saudi Arabia, Pakistan)
- Orosius albicinctus Distant, 1918 (Asia, North Africa, Australia, southern Europe)
- Orosius albifrons Fletcher & Löcker, 2016
- Orosius argentatus (Evans, 1938) (common brown leafhopper) (Australia, Pacific Islands, Azores)
- Orosius brunneus Fletcher & Löcker, 2016
- Orosius canberrensis (Evans, 1938) (Australia)
- Orosius cellulosus (Lindberg, 1927) (Sudan, Ethiopia, Australia, Saudi Arabia, Iran, Oman)
- Orosius lotophagorum (Kirkaldy, 1907) (Australia, Thailand, Pacific Islands)
- Orosius magareyi Fletcher & Löcker, 2016
- Orosius orientalis (Matsumura, 1914) (minami-madara-yokobai) (East Asia, Pacific Islands, Europe)
- Orosius pallidus Fletcher & Löcker, 2016
- Orosius recurvus Fletcher & Löcker, 2016
- Orosius ryukyuensis (Ishihara, 1965) (Japan, Federated States of Micronesia)
- Orosius santali Singh-Pruthi, 1934 (India)
- Orosius viraktamathi El-Sonbati & Wilson, 2019 (Saudi Arabia, Oman, United Arab Emirates)
