= Gori (surname) =

Gori or Gōri is the surname of the following people

- Adolfo Gori (born 1939), Italian football player
- Alberto Gori (1889–1970), Latin Patriarch of Jerusalem
- Andrea Chiopris Gori (born 1977), Italian footballer
- Angelica Cristina Gori (born 2001), know professionally as Chiamamifaro, Italian singer-songwriter
- Antonio Francesco Gori (1691–1757), Florentine antiquarian and professor
- Daisuke Gōri (1952–2010), Japanese voice actor
- Edoardo Gori (born 1990), Italian rugby union player
- Lollipop (actress), known as Federica Gori (1970–2008), Italian adult actress
- Gabriele Gori (beach soccer) (born 1987), Italian beach soccer player
- Gabriele Gori (born 1999), Italian footballer
- Gaspare Gori-Mancini (1653–1727), Italian prelate, Bishop of Malta
- Gastón Gori (1915–2004), Argentine essayist and poet
- Georges Gori (19th-20th century), French sculptor Art Deco
- Gio Batta Gori, American epidemiologist
- Giorgio Gori (born 1960), Italian entrepreneur, journalists and politician
- Giuseppe Gori, Canadian politician
- Gorella Gori (1900–1963), Italian stage and film actress
- Kathy Gori (born 1951), American voice actor
- Lallo Gori (1927–1982), Italian composer and musician
- Lamberto Cristiano Gori (1730–1801), Italian painter
- Marco Gori (born 1979), Italian association footballer
- Mario Cecchi Gori (1920–1993), Italian film producer
- Mario Gori (born 1973), Argentine footballer
- Mirko Gori (born 1993), Italian footballer
- Pietro Gori (1865–1911), Italian lawyer, journalist and anarchist poet
- Samantha Gori (born 1968), Italian basketball player
- Sergio Gori (1946–2023), Italian former football player
- Vittorio Cecchi Gori (born 1942), Italian film producer and politician

== See also ==
- Goris (surname)
