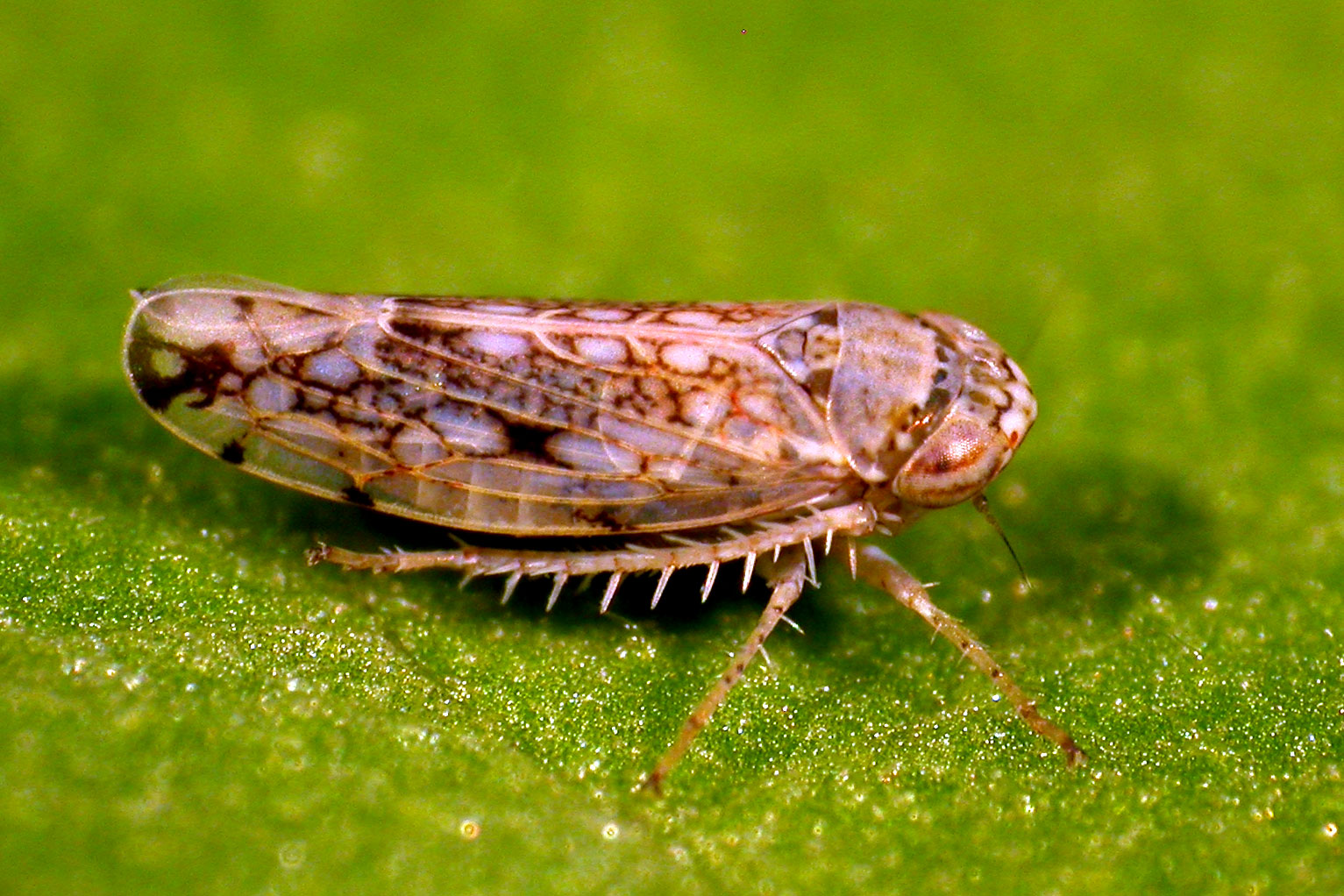

Scientific classification
- Domain: Eukaryota
- Kingdom: Animalia
- Phylum: Arthropoda
- Class: Insecta
- Order: Hemiptera
- Suborder: Auchenorrhyncha
- Family: Cicadellidae
- Genus: Orosius
- Species: O. orientalis

Binomial name
- Orosius orientalis (Matsumura, 1914)

Synonyms
- Orosius argentatus (Evans); Thamnotettix argentata (Evans)

= Common brown leafhopper =

Species of true bug

The common brown leafhopper (Orosius orientalis) is one of the most common species of Australian leafhoppers with a very wide host range. It is an important vector of several viruses and phytoplasmas worldwide. In Australia, phytoplasmas vectored by O. orientalis cause a range of economically important diseases including legume little leaf, tomato big bud, lucerne witches broom, potato purple top wilt, Australian lucerne and the insect is a possible vector of Australian grapevine yellows. O. orientalis also transmits Tobacco yellow dwarf virus (TYDV genus Mastrevirus, family Geminiviridae) to beans, causing bean summer death disease and to tobacco, causing tobacco yellow dwarf disease.

Although some direct damage caused by leafhopper feeding has been observed, it is relatively minor compared to the losses resulting from disease.
