= Ghoria albocinerea =

Scientific classification
- Domain: Eukaryota
- Kingdom: Animalia
- Phylum: Arthropoda
- Class: Insecta
- Order: Lepidoptera
- Superfamily: Noctuoidea
- Family: Erebidae
- Subfamily: Arctiinae
- Genus: Ghoria
- Species: G. albocinerea

Binomial name
- Ghoria albocinerea Moore, 1878

Synonyms
- Ghoria sericeipennis Moore, 1878

Species of moth

Ghoria albocinerea is a moth of the family Erebidae. It was described by Frederic Moore in 1878. It is found in Sikkim, India.
