= Jamshid Qarin Ghuri =

Iranian military commander

Jamshid Qarin Ghuri was an Iranian military commander from Khurasan, who served as the darugha (military governor) of the city of Sari in Mazandaran under Timur (r. 1370–1405) after its capture in 1393. After Jamshid's death, he was succeeded by his son Shams al-Din.

== Sources ==
- Calmard, J (1991). "Marʿas̲h̲is". In Bosworth, C. E.; van Donzel, E. & Pellat, Ch. (eds.). The Encyclopaedia of Islam, Second Edition. Volume VI: Mahk–Mid. Leiden: E. J. Brill. ISBN 978-90-04-08112-3.
- Manz, Beatrice Forbes (2020). "Iranian Elites under the Timurids". In Steenbergen, Jo Van (ed.). Trajectories of State Formation across Fifteenth-Century Islamic West-Asia. Brill. pp. 257–282. ISBN 978-9004431300.
