= Gori, Burkina Faso =

Coordinates: 11°25′N 2°24′W

Gori
- Village
- Interactive map of Gori
- Country: Burkina Faso
- Region: Est Region
- Province: Gnagna Province
- Department: Manni Department

Population (2019)
  - Total: 811

Gori is a village in the Manni Department of Gnagna Province in eastern Burkina Faso.

Population
Year	Pop.	±%
2006	720	—
2019	811	+12.6%
