= Self Organised Learning Environment =

A Self Organized Learning Environment (SOLE) is a program designed to support self-directed education. Sugata Mitra, an education scientist, first popularized the term in 1999, referencing an approach he developed following his Hole in the Wall experiments. Mitra's experiments demonstrated that groups of kids could learn to navigate computers and the internet by themselves, and "research since then has continued to support his startling conclusion that groups of children, with access to the Internet, can learn almost anything by themselves." Starting in 2014, he's worked with and through the School in the Cloud project to support the development of SOLEs around the world, adding "Granny" mentors and Big Questions as key components of such programs.

Mitra has also served as the inspiration for StartSOLE.org, a platform used by classroom educators to drive inquiry-based learning.

In 2022, Mitra was recognized with the Brock Prize in Education Innovation for his transformational work in rethinking the way children learn.

== Initial experiments and Project SOLE ==
One of the things that was learned through the program is that children are often smarter than given credit for. Rather than providing lectures or spoon-feeding information to the students, it is better to ask "engaging, provocative questions" and let them work out the answers. It was also determined to be good to let the students self-direct in the areas that are of interest to them, with the idea that students will then often stretch to comprehend information that might have otherwise been too difficult for them.

The first student in India to use the program was Gouri Chindarkar (born about 1996) from Sangli in Maharashtra. She learned about the program through a mentor, an American woman named Ann Thomas, who met with her at 6:30 in the morning. She used a computer for the first time, and her schoolwork delivered in English; her native language is Marathi. Gouri Chindarkar has since studied Computing Engineering at the Kankavali campus of Mumbai University and she was selected as one of the BBC's 100 Women in 2016.

Project SOLE was begun in 10 locations in Hyderabad, Andhra Pradesh, with an 11th one in Sindhudurg rural area of Maharashtra over a period of 2 years, 2008 to 2009. It is not clear to what extent the learning is effective over the long-term.

== The School In The Cloud ==
In their own words, "The School in the Cloud platform was originally launched at the 2014 TED conference to help accelerate this research by helping educators — be they teachers, parents or community leaders — to run their own SOLEs and to contribute to the global experiment by sharing their experiences with others. It is now managed by SOLE Central at Newcastle University, a global hub for SOLE research and practice directed by Sugata Mitra." They are currently experimenting to refine and increase access to education programs that blend the SOLE approach of encouraging student groups to self-direct online learning with lessons from the Philosophy For Children (P4C) project.

== StartSOLE.org ==
With inspiration from Sugata Mitra and support from the David and Barbara Jacobs Foundation, education entrepreneur Jeffrey McClellan launched StartSOLE in 2017 as a way for any educator to drive student-centered, inquiry-based learning into their classrooms. As of 2022, more than 35,000 educators from over 110 different countries were part of the StartSOLE community using the platform to find and share big questions, create lesson plans and empower over 2.4 Million students to develop confidence in their own abilities to solve problems, find information, work in teams and still master curricular content. StartSOLE is subject agnostic and can be used to fuel learning for any subject. In 2020, Pennsylvania adopted StartSOLE as its way to allow any educator in the state to drive inquiry-based learning.

== Adaptation within institutionalized education ==
Though Mitra's initial experiments focused on children living in unstable environments and in poverty, his findings inspired educators in a wide variety of environments to adapt his work. Teachers in both traditional and progressive environments have found ways to incorporate the SOLE approach in their work, whether for the span of a lesson or a semester. One prominent education blog suggests, "Consider it a tool for introducing and generating interest in a new topic, as well as broadening your students’ understanding of a familiar topic." In this context, the SOLE is just one element in a larger inquiry or project-based learning cycle.

== Adaptation beyond institutionalized education ==
For some, the initial SOLE projects showed the immense potential for learning in settings where students leverage technology and social learning to explore their interests with minimal interference. The US nonprofit Black Mountain SOLE opened a community center "inspired by the idea that human curiosity is the best motivation for learning" and identifying as an adaptation from earlier SOLE projects. Agile Learning Centers and a number of the projects that are part of the Alliance for Self-Directed Education also consider themselves to either be or be inspired by SOLEs.
