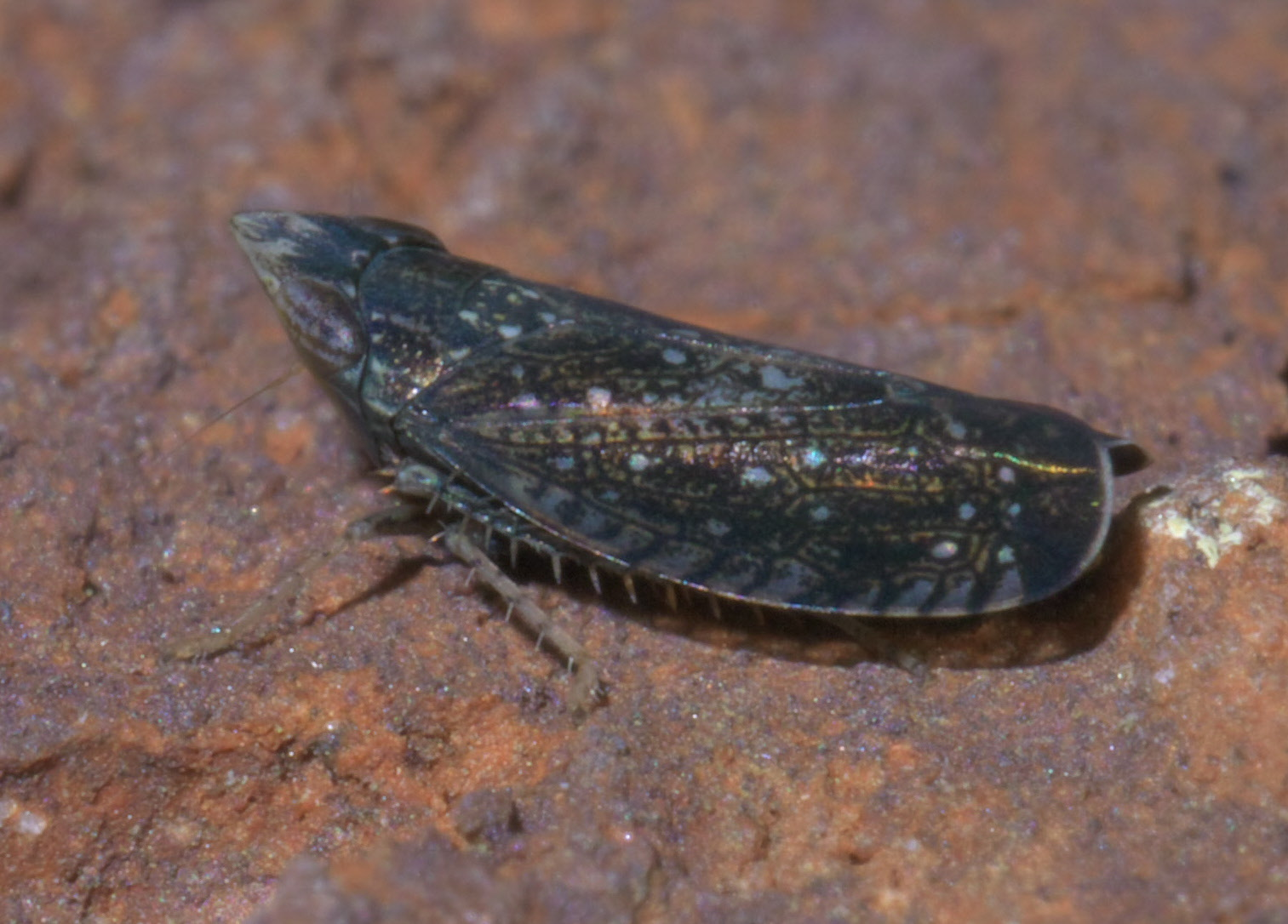
- Scaphytopius frontalis

Scientific classification
- Domain: Eukaryota
- Kingdom: Animalia
- Phylum: Arthropoda
- Class: Insecta
- Order: Hemiptera
- Suborder: Auchenorrhyncha
- Family: Cicadellidae
- Subfamily: Deltocephalinae
- Tribe: Scaphytopiini
- Genus: Scaphytopius; Ball, 1931

= Scaphytopius =

Genus of leafhoppers

Scaphytopius is a genus of leafhoppers in the family Cicadellidae. There are at least 170 described species in Scaphytopius.

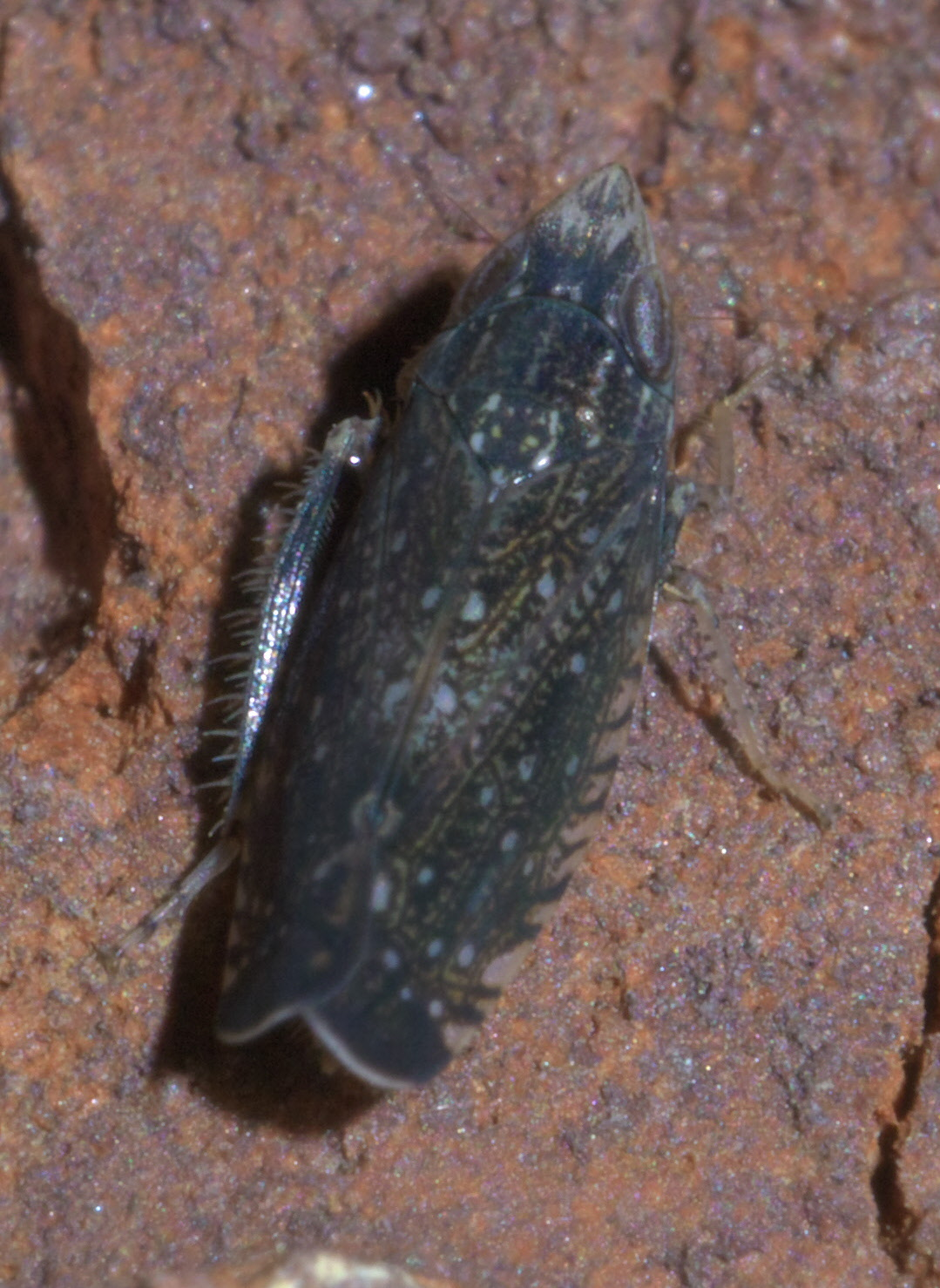
Scaphytopius frontalis

== See also ==
- List of Scaphytopius species
