= Ghoria collitoides =

Scientific classification
- Kingdom: Animalia
- Phylum: Arthropoda
- Clade: Pancrustacea
- Class: Insecta
- Order: Lepidoptera
- Superfamily: Noctuoidea
- Family: Erebidae
- Subfamily: Arctiinae
- Genus: Ghoria
- Species: G. collitoides

Binomial name
- Ghoria collitoides Butler, 1885

Synonyms
- Agylla collitoides

Species of moth

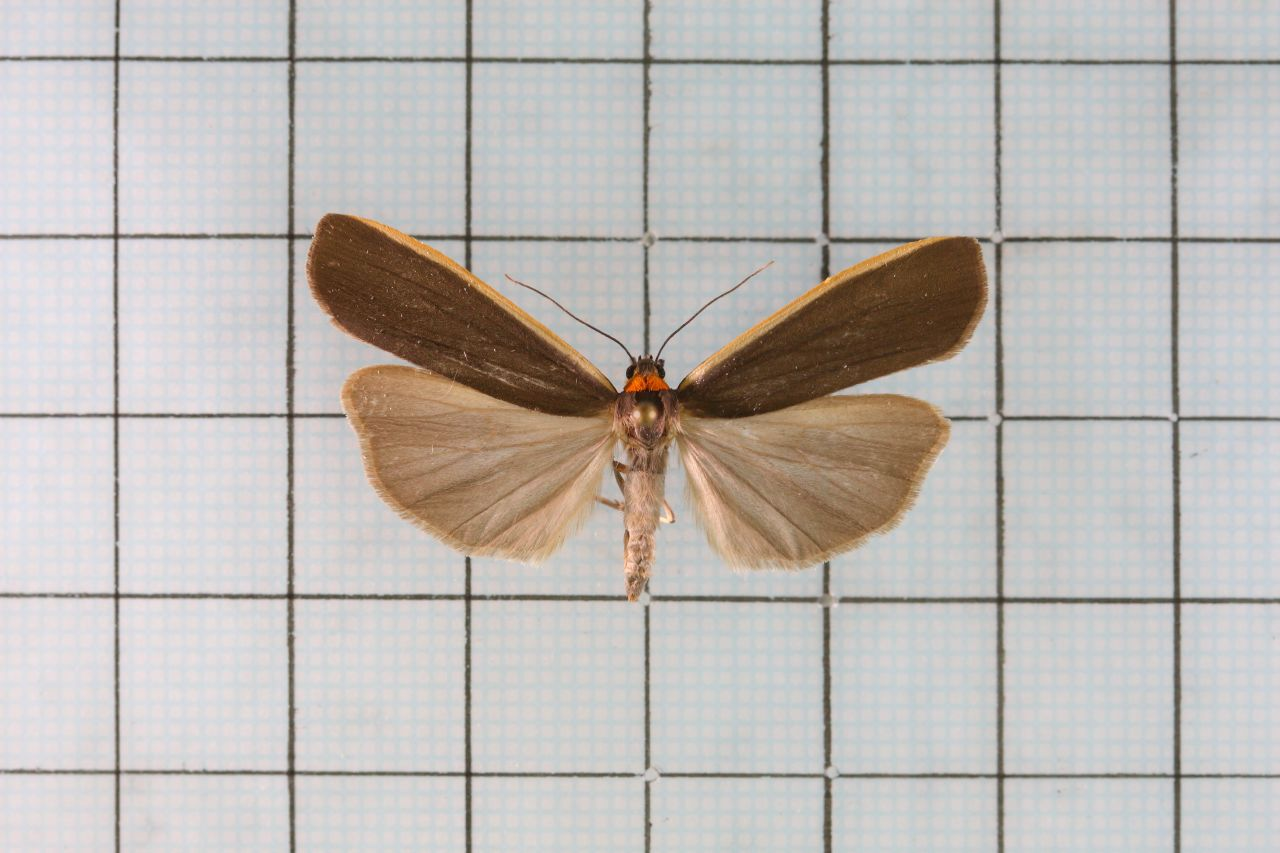
Ghoria collitoides specimen

Ghoria collitoides is a moth of the family Erebidae. It was described by Arthur Gardiner Butler in 1885. It is found in the Russian Far East (Amur, Primorye, Sakhalin, Kunashir), China (Heilongjiang, Jilin, Shaanxi, Sichuan, Yunan), Korea and Japan.
