= Jangal Gauri =

Indian village

Jangal Gauri is a village in Gorakhpur, Uttar Pradesh, India.
