= Gowri Koneswaran =

American poet

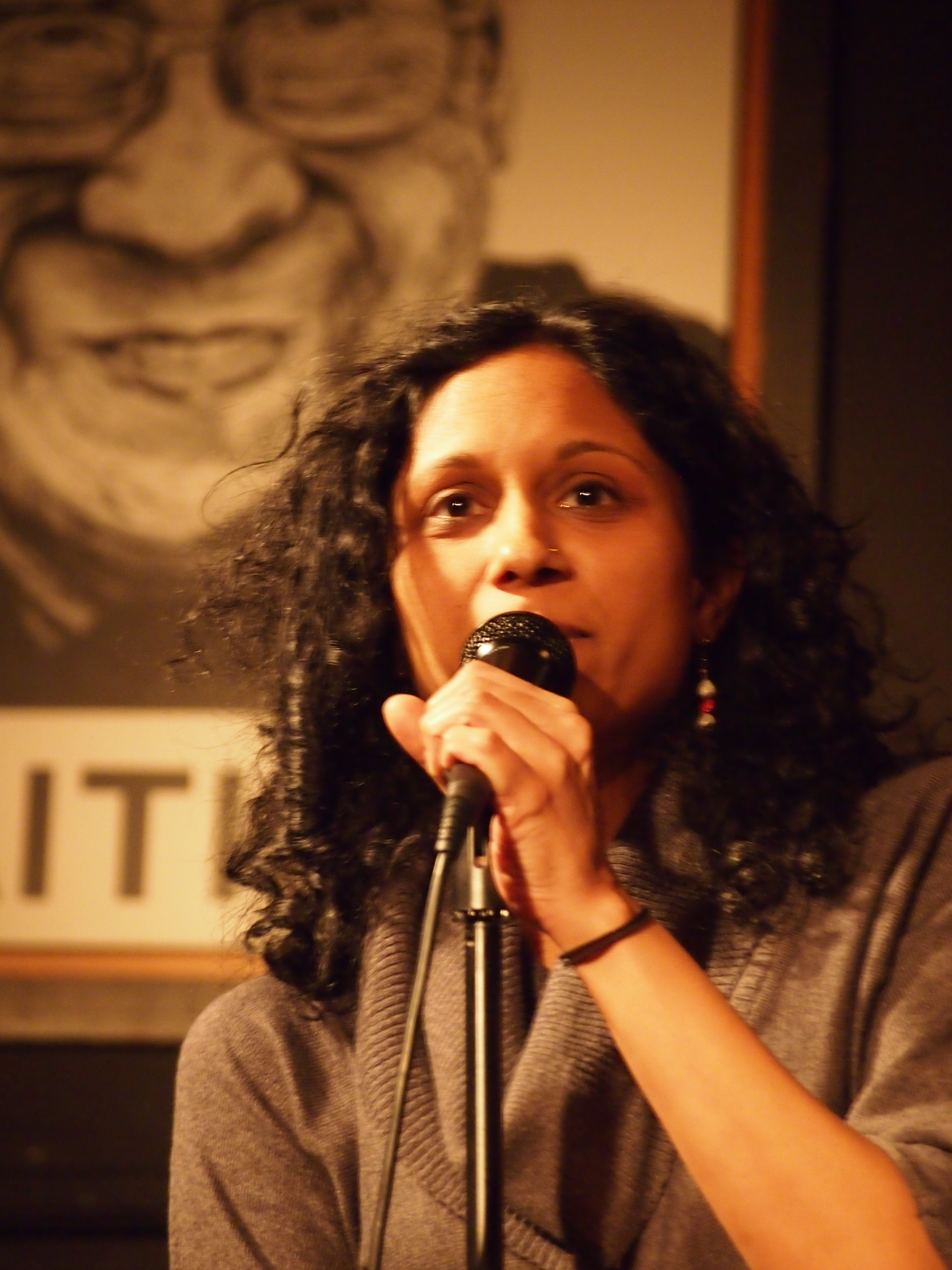
Gowri k reading at Split this Rock 2014

Gowri Koneswaran is a queer Tamil-American poet, performing artist, teacher, and lawyer whose family immigrated to the U.S. from Sri Lanka. She is a Kundiman fellow.

== Performances & Publications ==
Her poems are available in Split This Rock's The Quarry, Beltway Poetry Quarterly, Bourgeon, Lantern Review, Washington City Paper, and On Being. She was also a member of the 2010 D.C. Southern Fried Slam Team and has performed at Lincoln Center Out of Doors, the Kennedy Center's Millennium Stage, Smithsonian Folklife Festival, Smithsonian Asian American Literature Festival, and Dakshina/Daniel Phoenix Singh Dance Company events co-sponsored by the Poets & Writers Readings/Workshops program.

== Career ==
Gowri was previously The Humane Society of the U.S.'s Director of Animal Agricultural Impacts and a Program Manager for the Farm Animal Welfare division. She co-authored the peer-reviewed journal articles "Global Farm Animal Production and Global Warming: Impacting and Mitigating Climate Change" and "The Public Health Impacts of Concentrated Animal Feeding Operations on Local Communities."
