= Juloori Gouri Shankar =

Indian writer

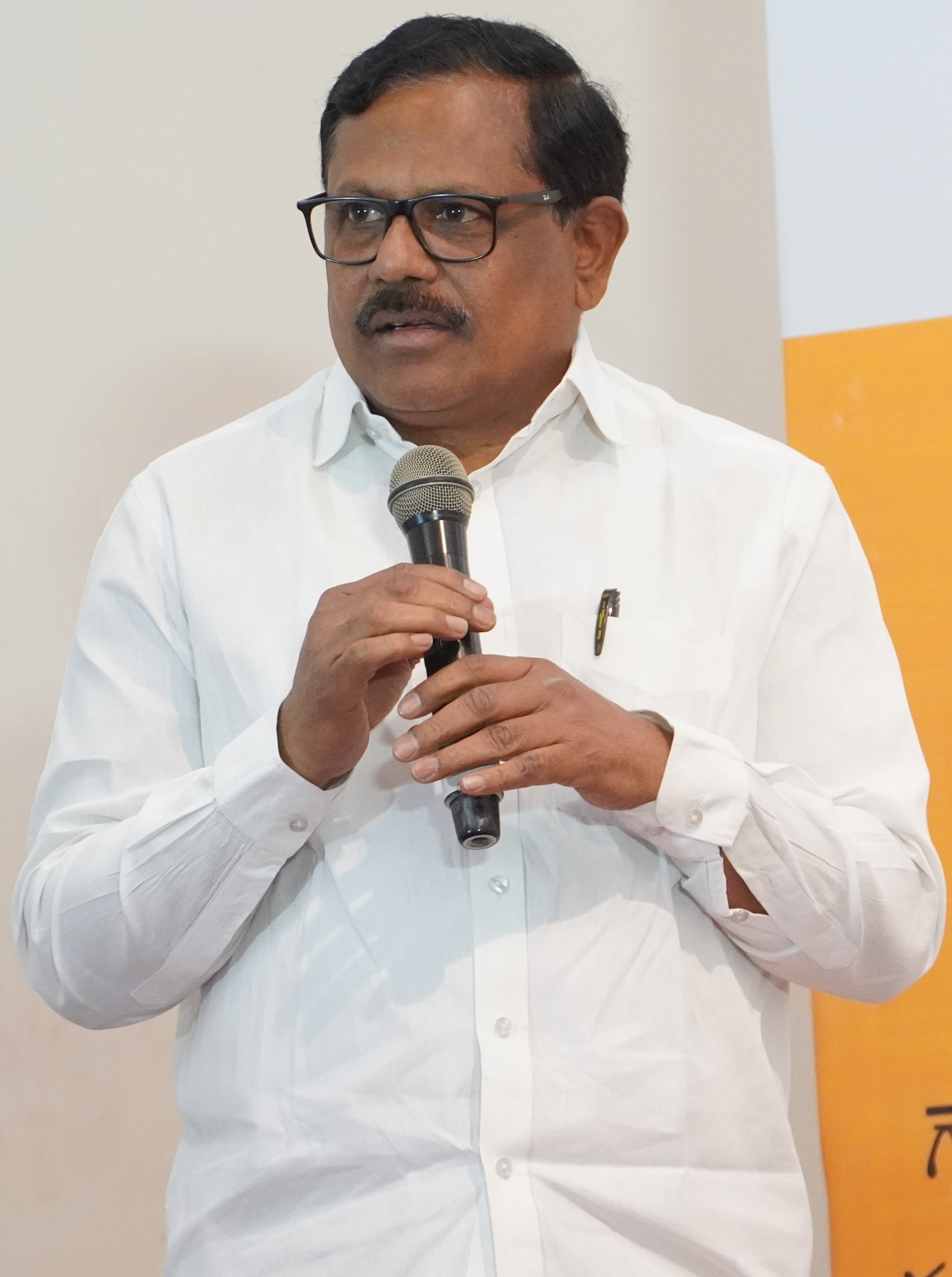

Chairman Telangana Sahitya Akademi
- In office 17 December 2021 – 7 December 2023

Personal details
- Born: 4 January 1960 (age 66) Kodad, Suryapet district, Telangana
- Occupation: Poet & Writer

Juloori Gouri Shankar is an Indian writer of Telugu-language works. He is the president of Telangana Rachayatala Vedika. He is the author of Sakala Janula Samme.

He served as Telangana Sahitya Akademi chairman from 17 December 2021 to December 2023 and earlier as BC Commission Member from 2016 to 2019.
