= Kuri, Kermanshah =

Kuri كوري
- Village
- Location within Iran
- Coordinates: 34°50′30″N 46°27′04″E
- Country: Iran
- Province: Kermanshah
- County: Javanrud
- Bakhsh: Central
- Rural District: Palanganeh

Population (2006)
  - Total: 184
- Time zone: UTC+3:30 (IRST)
  - Summer (DST): UTC+4:30 (IRDT)

Kuri (Persian: كوري, also Romanized as Kūrī; also known as Gūrī) is a village in Palanganeh Rural District, in the Central District of Javanrud County, Kermanshah Province, Iran. At the 2006 census, its population was 184, in 35 families.
