= Marco Gori =

Italian footballer

Personal information
- Date of birth: 26 July 1979 (age 47)
- Place of birth: Florence, Italy
- Height: 1.87 m (6 ft 2 in)
- Position: Midfielder

Senior career*
Years	Team	Apps	(Gls)
1997–2001	Empoli	1	(0)
1998–1999	→ Battipagliese (loan)	20	(0)
1999–2001	→ Prato (loan)	51	(7)
2001–2002	Monza	29	(1)
2002–2003	Prato	32	(0)
2003–2008	AlbinoLeffe	180	(10)
2008–2010	Cremonese	48	(4)
2010–2012	Prato	28	(0)
- * Club domestic league appearances and goals

Marco Gori (born 26 July 1979) is an Italian former association footballer.

Gori made his Serie A debut on 8 March 1998 against A.S. Bari.
