= Ghurid Pashtuns =

Eastern Iranian people

Ghurid or Ghauriyan (Note: also spelt Ghouri, Ghauri) (Pashto: غوري) are a tribe of the larger Ghauriyakhel Pashtun confederation. The tribe which was formed by Afghans and eponymous to Ghor, Afghanistan is named Ghuraid after the battles conquered by Muhammad of Ghor's courtier referred to him as the "Sultan-i-Ghazi" (sultan of the holy warriors) and portrayed his Indian expeditions as a battle between the army of Islam and the army of infidels.

Their descendants are known as Ghuraids in war times later Ghauri from Afghanistan and Ghouri within the Iran, Turkey and all over the Indian subcontinent.

== Origin and inhabitance ==
They originate from Tribe of Muhammad Ghori, who came to Turkey, Iran and Indian peninsula during the successive Muslim invasions of the 11th and 12th centuries AD, forming a part of the Afghan armies of Mahmud of Ghazni and Muhammed Ghori. Gradually over the centuries they settled in leading cities of subcontinent. With their martial background, they were in great demand as soldiers and mercenaries for different principalities. The city of Meerut, in Indian state of Uttar Pradesh, has been said to be the earliest settlement of the Ghuraids or Ghauri/Ghori in North India, and the Ghauris have been settled there for at least eight hundred years with other pathan tribes in the district include the Kakar, Bangash, Tareen and Afridi. In Lahore, a historic cultural center of wider Punjab region, Ghauris settled within the confines of Mochi Gate, which itself is marred form of Urdu word “Morchi” meaning “Trench Soldier” different streets (Mohallahs) still bear their old names like Mohalla Teer-garan (arrow craftsmen), Mohalla Kaman-garan (bow craftsmen) etc. Even today we find bazaars on the same names. This is further supported by remnants of graves as old as six hundred years in Miani Sahib's Graveyard, the oldest graveyard in the city. Some instances of migration from India to various areas of Pakistan at the time of partition of 1947 have also been observed.
