= Gauri Gokhale =

Indian cricketer (born 1984)

Gauri Sandip Gokhale (born 5 May 1984) is a Maharashtrian cricketer. She played for Mumbai and West zone. She has played 34 limited over and 9 Women's Twenty20 matches.
