= Gori shola =

Gori shola is a locale in Ooty famous for its water reservoir. It is located off the road from Ooty to Doddabetta amidst the Doddabetta forests. It is a tourist spot in the town, which provides a pleasing look of the surroundings from the top of the reservoir.

== Dargah ==
A Dargah has been built on top of a hill in Gori shola. It is the final resting place of a saint called Hazrath Peer Syed Hassan Shah. The Dargah, which is several decades old, has gained popularity over the years and is now a popular pilgrimage centre among Muslims in and around the Nilgiris district. A popular festival called the urs Hazrath Peer Syed Hassan Shah Khadri is celebrated in the Dargah annually.

== Littering concerns ==
Gori shola has had problems with people littering discarded items like cigarette packets, liquor bottles and plastic bottles and lighting bon-fires in the area. Graffiti inside the pump house and on the walls of the reservoir has been placed by vandals. This has been a concern for local residents and environmentalists, since the area adjoins a reserve forest and a water body.

== See also ==
- Government Rose Garden, Ooty
- Government Botanical Gardens, Udagamandalam
- Ooty Lake
- Ooty Golf Course
- Stone House, Ooty
- Ooty Radio Telescope
- Mariamman temple, Ooty
- St. Stephen's Church, Ooty
