= Gauri Pundah =

Gauri Pundah (also spelt as Gauri Punda) is a village in Fatuha development block of district Patna in the state of Bihar, India.
