= Gouri Dharmapal =

Indian poet and Sanskrit scholar

- Born: 1931
- Died: 2014 (aged 82–83); Kolkata, India
- Citizenship: Indian
- Known for: Poet, Sanskrit Scholar
- Notable work: The Linguistic Atom
- Spouse: Gautam Dharmapal
- Children: Rohini and Ananda Dharmapal
- Awards: Certificate of Honour by the President of India, 2010

Gouri Dharmapal (1931–2014) was an Indian poet, Sanskrit scholar, and the former head of the department of Sanskrit at Lady Brabourne College at the University of Calcutta. In 2010 she was awarded a Certificate of Honour by the President of India. Dharmapal was the first woman priest of West Bengal.

== Career ==
She graduated from Kolkata's renowned Scottish Church College in 1951. Post Graduated from Calcutta University in 1954 and was subsequently awarded an Ishan Scholarship by the University of Calcutta for postgraduate studies. She conducted research at the SOAS, University of London, and at the British Museum in London. She has been a novelist, essayist, Indologist, as well as a storyteller for children's books.
