= Zulfiqar Ghouri =

Pakistani politician

Member of the Provincial Assembly of the Punjab
- In office 29 May 2013 – 31 May 2018
- Constituency: Reserved seat for minorities

Personal details
- Born: 31 March 1955 (age 71) Sialkot
- Party: Pakistan Muslim League (N)

Zulfiqar Ghouri is a Pakistani politician who was a Member of the Provincial Assembly of the Punjab, from May 2013 to May 2018.

== Early life and education ==
He was born on 31 March 1955 in Sialkot.

He received intermediate level education from Government Murray College, Sialkot in 1973.

== Political career ==
He was elected to the Provincial Assembly of the Punjab as a candidate of Pakistan Muslim League (N) on reserved seat for minorities in the 2013 Pakistani general election.
