= Herbert Osborn =

American entomologist

Herbert Osborn (March 19, 1856 – September 20, 1954) was an American entomologist.

== Biography ==
He held various posts at Iowa State College, eventually becoming head of the Department of Zoology and Entomology from 1882 to 1897, and was the first State Entomologist of Iowa in 1898. He left Iowa in 1898 to become chairman of the Department of Zoology and Entomology at Ohio State University (1898-1916), where he was later named emeritus professor. He died in Columbus, Ohio.

Much of Professor Osborn's research was concerned with the Hemiptera, especially the leafhoppers of the Cicadellidae. He also studied economically important insects of the Anoplura and Thysanoptera. More than 500 publications bear his name.

== Works ==
- The Chinch Bug in Iowa (1888)
- The Hessian Fly in the United States (1898)
- Insects Affecting Domestic Animals: An Account of the Species of Importance in North America, with Mention of Related Forms Occurring on Other Animals (1896)
- Economic Zoology: An Introductory Text-Book in Zoology, with Special Reference to its Applications in Agriculture, Commerce, and Medicine (1909)
- Leafhoppers of Maine (1915)
- Agricultural entomology for students, farmers, fruit-growers and gardeners (1916)
- The Leafhoppers of Ohio (1928)
- Fragments of Entomological History (1937)
- Meadow and pasture insects (1939)
- Recent Insect Invasions in Ohio (1948)
