= Mohammed Sultan Khan Ghauri =

Entomologist

Mohammed Sultan Khan Ghauri is an entomologist specialising in Hemiptera.

== Selected works ==
- The Morphology and Taxonomy of Male Scale Insects (Homoptera : Coccoidea). British Museum. 1962.
- "Revision of the genus Orosius Distant (Homoptera : Cicadelloidea)". Bulletin of the British Museum (Natural History), Entomology Series. 18 (7): 229–252. 1966.
