= Gauri Bazar =

- Town
- Location in Uttar Pradesh, India Gauri Bazar (India)
- Coordinates: 26.593171°N 83.667884°E
- Country: India
- State: Uttar Pradesh
- District: Deoria

Population (2001)
  - Total: 6,224

Languages
  - Official: Hindi
- Time zone: UTC+5:30 (IST)
- Postal code: 274202
- Vehicle registration: UP
- Website: up.gov.in

Gauri Bazar is a town and a nagar panchayat in Deoria district in the state of Uttar Pradesh, India.

== Demographics ==
As of 2001 India census, Gauri Bazar had a population of 6224. Males constitute 54% of the population and females 46%. Gauri Bazar has an average literacy rate of 62%, lower than the national average of 79.9%: male literacy is 67%, and female literacy is 56%. In Gauri Bazar, 11% of the population is under 6 years of age.

== Villages ==
- Ashanhar
- Indupur
- Deogaon
- Damar Bishwa
- Pandey Bishwa
- Pachohia
- Rampur
- Gauri Buzurg
- Navgaaonwa
- Patharahat
- Raishari
- Kharaoh
- Kakwal
- Labkani
- Kalavan
- Karmaazipur
- Pokhar bhinda
- Langadi
- Keshobari
- Karjahi
- Badhhara
- Bansahiya
- Narayanpur Tiwari
- Panankunda
