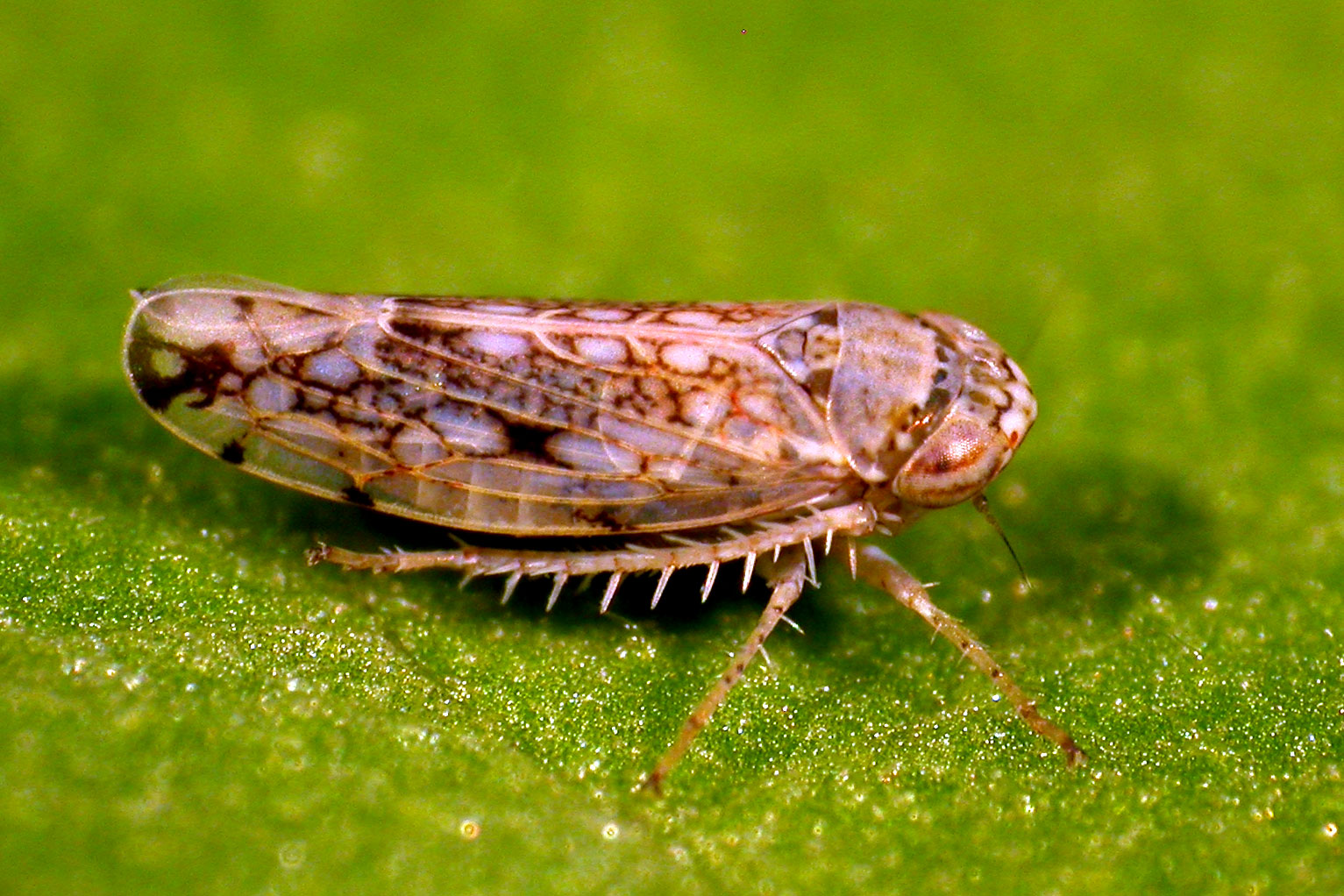
- Orosius orientalis

Scientific classification
- Kingdom: Animalia
- Phylum: Arthropoda
- Clade: Pancrustacea
- Class: Insecta
- Order: Hemiptera
- Suborder: Auchenorrhyncha
- Family: Cicadellidae
- Subfamily: Deltocephalinae
- Tribe: Opsiini; Emeljanov, 1962

= Opsiini =

Tribe of true bugs

Opsiini is a tribe of leafhoppers in the subfamily Deltocephalinae. The tribe contains 36 genera and over 300 species divided into four subtribes: Achaeticina, Circuliferina, Eremophlepsiina, and Opsiina.

== Genera ==
There are currently 36 described genera divided into four subtribes within Opsiini:

Subtribe Achaeticina Emeljanov, 1962

- Achaetica Emeljanov, 1959
- Chlidochrus Emeljanov, 1962
- Diacra Emeljanov, 1961
- Zapycna Emeljanov, 1968

Subtribe Circuliferina Emeljanov, 1962

- Concavifer Dlabola, 1960
- Dixianus Ball, 1918
- Lycioides Oman, 1949
- Neoaliturus Distant, 1918
- Pedarium Emeljanov, 1961

Subtribe Eremophlepsiina Dmitriev, 2006

- Eremophlepsius Zachvatkin, 1924
- Pseudophlepsius Zachvatkin, 1924

Subtribe Opsiina Emeljanov, 1962

- Afrascius Linnavuori, 1969
- Aladzoa Linnavuori, 1969
- Alishania Vilbaste, 1969
- Hishimonoides Ishihara, 1965
- Hishimonus Ishihara, 1953
- Introrsa Dai & Zhang, 2010
- Japananus Ball, 1931
- Kirkaldiella Osborn, 1935
- Lampridius Distant, 1918
- Libengaia Linnavuori, 1969
- Litura Knight, 1970
- Masiripius Dlabola, 1981
- Naevus Knight, 1970
- Navaia Linnavuori, 1960
- Nesophrosyne Kirkaldy, 1907
- Norva Emeljanov, 1969
- Opsianus Linnavuori, 1960
- Opsius Fieber, 1866
- Orosius Distant, 1918
- Paralampridius Dai, Dietrich & Zhang, 2011
- Phlepsopsius Dlabola, 1979
- Pugla Distant, 1908
- Satsumanus Ishihara, 1953
- Vittaliana Sunil, Meshram, Hashmi & Shashank, 2020
- Xerophytacolus Stiller, 2012
- Xerophytavorus Stiller, 2012
