= Malaviya National Institute of Technology, Jaipur =

Public technical university in Jaipur, India

- Other name: NIT Jaipur
- Former names: Malaviya Regional Engineering College (MREC), Jaipur
- Motto: Yogah Karmasu Kaushalam योगः कर्मसु कौशलम्
- Motto in English: Diligence leads to Excellence
- Type: Public Technical university
- Established: 1963; 63 years ago
- Accreditation: NBA
- Affiliations: Ministry of Education
- Chairperson: Ar. Habeeb Khan
- Director: Narayana Prasad Padhy
- Location: Jawahar Lal Nehru Marg, Malviya Nagar, Jaipur, Rajasthan, India; 26.8622°N 75.8156°E
- Campus: 317 acres (1.28 km^{2}); Urban, 317 acres (1.28 km^{2})
- Acronym: MNITJ
- Colors: Red and White
- Nicknames: NITians, MNITians
- Website: www.mnit.ac.in

Malaviya National Institute of Technology Jaipur (MNIT or NIT Jaipur) is a public technical university located in Jaipur, India. Established 1963 as Malaviya Regional Engineering College (MREC), it was renamed to its current form in 2002.

In 2007m through the enactment of the National Institutes of Technology Act, the Parliament of India recognized the university as an Institute of National Importance in 2007. It is fully funded and operated under the Ministry of Education and is governed by a Senate as per NIT Statutes.

== History ==
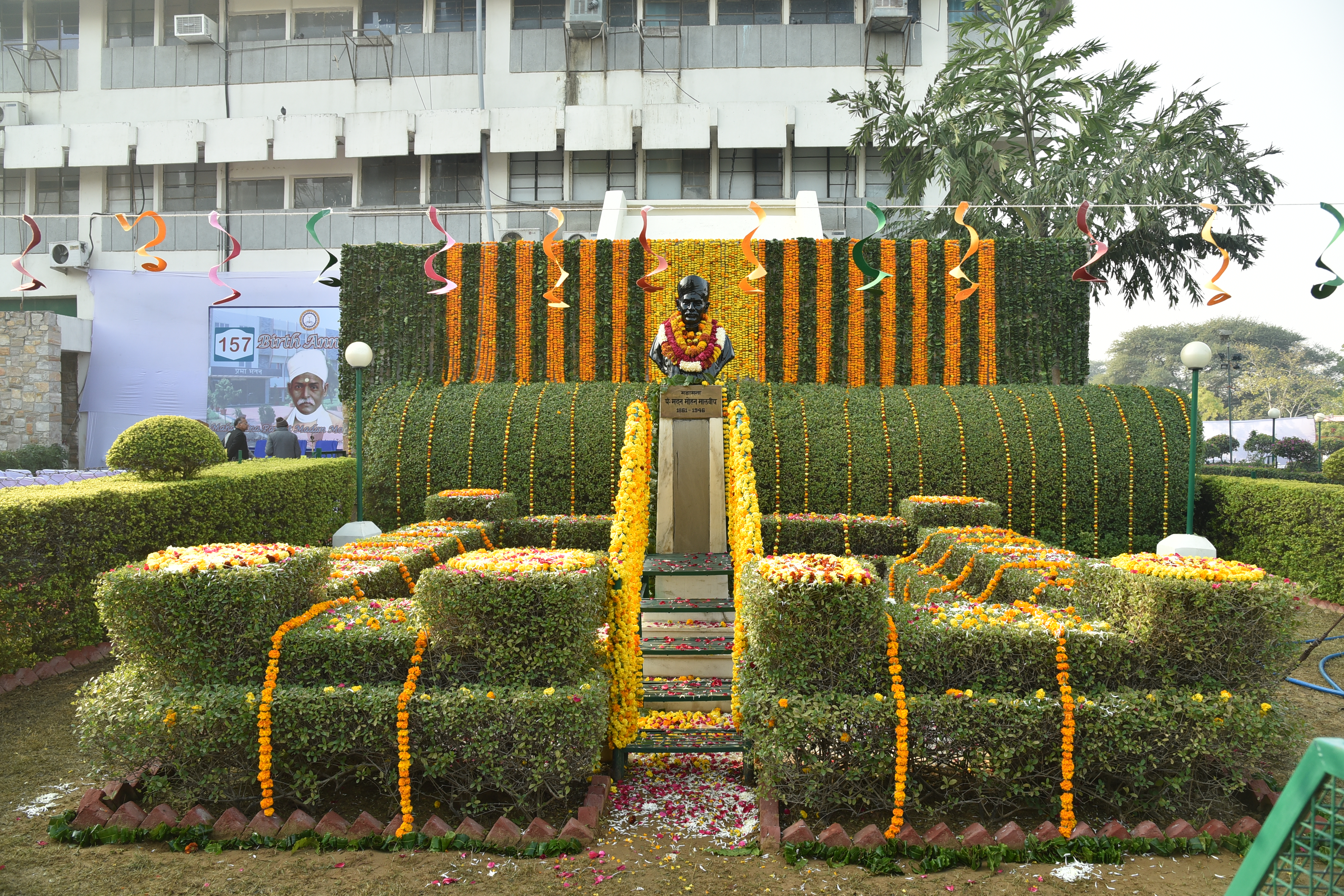
Pt. Madan Mohan Malaviyaji statue

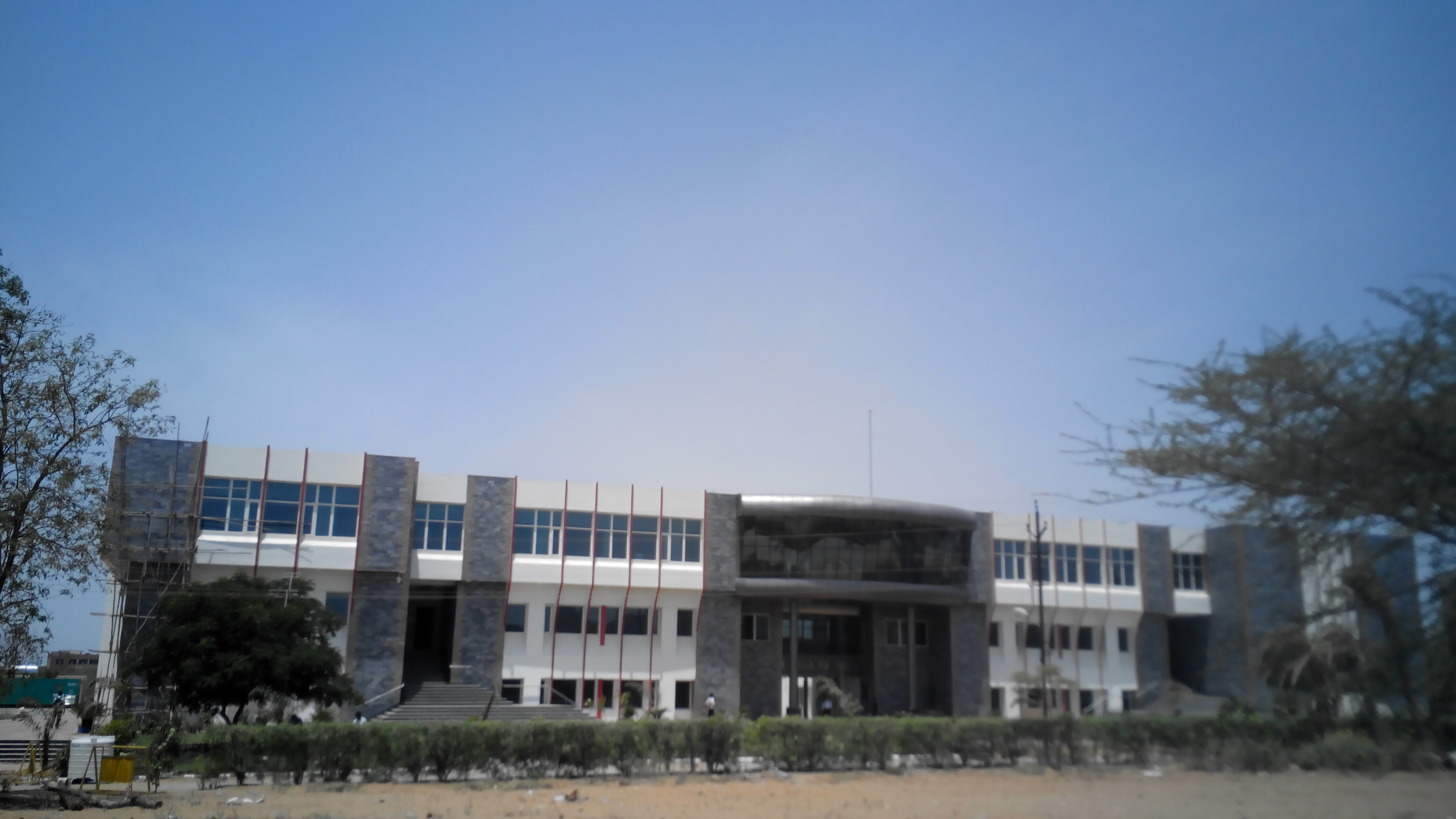
Prabha Bhawan – Main Building

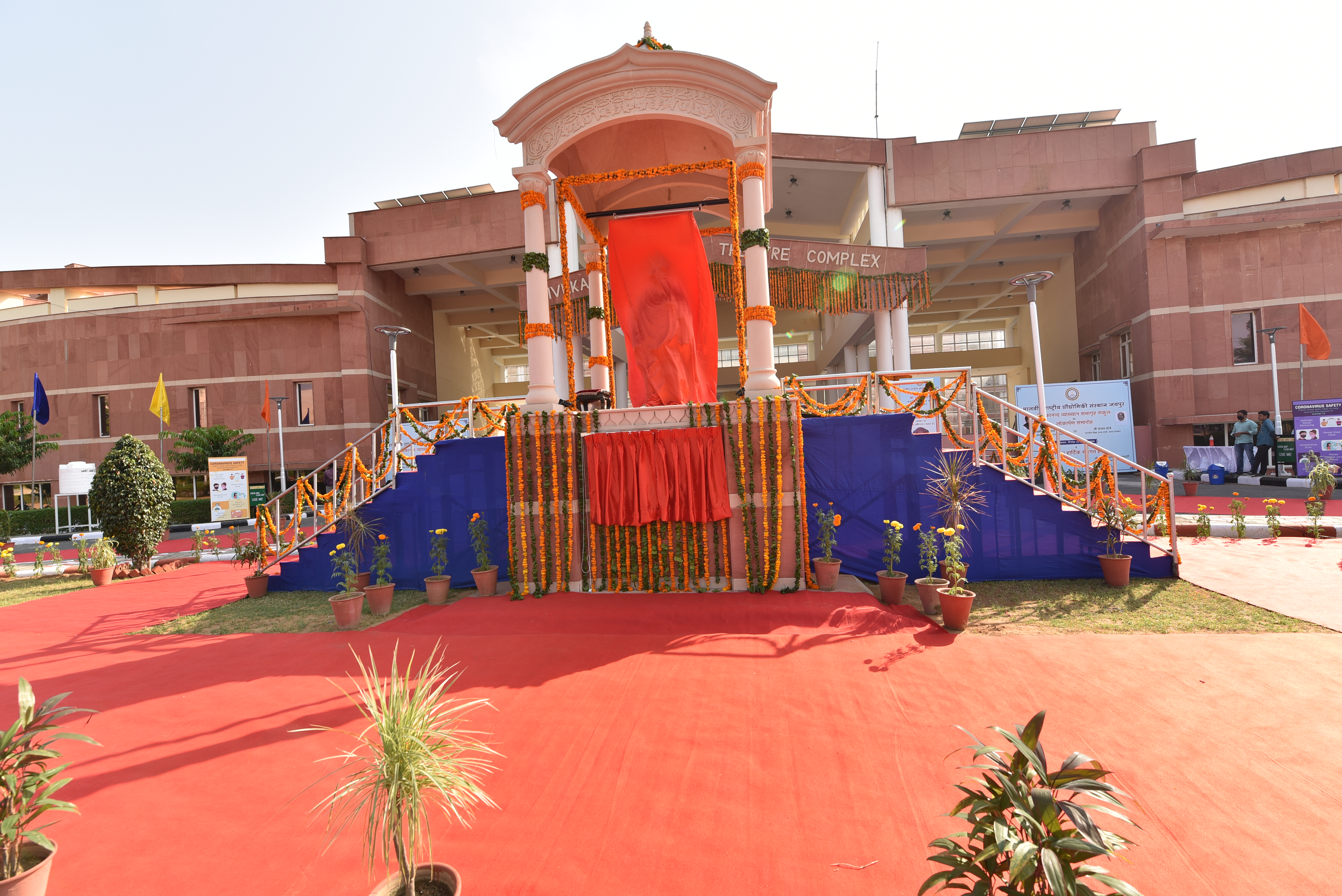
Vivekanand Lecture Hall Complex

The institute was established as a joint venture between the Government of India and the Government of Rajasthan in 1963 as Malaviya Regional Engineering College (MREC). It was named after Madan Mohan Malaviya.

V.G. Garde was its first principal. The college moved to the present campus in Jaipur in 1965.

It used to offer five-year Bachelor of Engineering programs in Civil, Electrical, Mechanical, and Metallurgical Engineering. The duration of the B.E. Degree Course was changed to four years from the year 1983.

The institute was upgraded to a National Institute of Technology and was declared a Deemed University on 26 June 2002 since then the institute started offering Bachelor of Technology (B.Tech.) degree instead of Bachelor of Engineering (B.E.) degree.

On 15 August 2007, MNIT and all other NITs were declared Institutes of National Importance by the government of India under the National Institutes of Technology Act, 2007. The institute is now under The Ministry of Education (MHRD), New Delhi. It has been selected to participate in the Technical Education Quality Improvement Program of the government of India and the World Bank.

== Academics ==
=== Programmes ===
MNIT offers a wide variety of study in engineering, sciences, management, design, and humanities with a primary focus on engineering. Eight four-year undergraduate courses of study led to the Bachelor of Technology degree and a five-year undergraduate course leading to the Bachelor of Architecture degree, with a total of over 5,000 students. Postgraduate degrees award Master of Technology (M.Tech.), Master of Science (M.Sc.), Master of Business Administration (M.B.A) and Master of Urban Planning. There are also doctoral programs with over 300 students. There are over 150 faculty members engaged in teaching and research.

=== Requisites for enrolments ===
Admission to undergraduate courses of the institute is through the Central Seat Allocation Board (CSAB) which takes into account the performance in Joint Entrance Examination (JEE).

Supernumerary seats are reserved for students from outside India who are nominated by the Ministry of External Affairs, Govt. of India, and the Indian Council of Cultural Relations and DASA students. SAT scores are criteria for selection.

Admission for post graduate courses namely Master of Technology (M.Tech.) and Master of Urban & Regional Planning (MURP) are through Centralized Counselling for MTech/MArch and M.Plan (CCMT) after Graduate Aptitude Test in Engineering (GATE).

Admission to M.Sc. is through CCMN (Centralized Counseling for MSc/MSc (Tech.)) after IIT JAM, admission to M.B.A. is through GMAT/CAT followed by GD, PI and Ph.D. are through department's respective written test followed by an interview.

=== Rankings ===
College rankings

Engineering – India
- NIRF (2024): 43

Architecture – India
- NIRF (2024): 15

Malaviya National Institute of Technology, Jaipur was ranked 43rd among engineering colleges by the National Institutional Ranking Framework (NIRF) in 2024.

== Research ==
MNIT is 3rd ranked NIT according to research ranking of NIRF ranking and 50th overall.

MNIT have three center for research:

=== 1. Center for Energy and Environment ===
The Centre for Energy & Environment focuses on sustainable energy research, renewable technologies, and environmental solutions. With strong national and international collaborations, it leads renewable energy research in northwest India.

=== 2. Materials Research Center ===
The Materials Research Centre (MRC) at Malaviya National Institute of Technology Jaipur is a Centre of Excellence established to support advanced research, training, and innovation in materials science and materials technology. The centre provides state-of-the-art research infrastructure and promotes interdisciplinary collaboration between scientists, engineers, and industry partners.

MRC supports a wide range of research in materials technology, including:

- Nanomaterials
- Advanced functional materials
- Polymers and composites
- Energy-related materials
- Structural and engineering materials

=== 3. National Center for Disaster Mitigation and Management. ===
Research in the institute is sponsored by major government agencies which include the Indian Ordnance Factories, Ministry of Communication & IT, Govt. of India, Council of Scientific and Industrial Research (CSIR), Defence Research and Development Organisation (DRDO) and the Department of Science and Technology (DST).

=== MOUs ===
MNIT Jaipur has established extensive global academic partnerships through Memoranda of Understanding (MoUs) with universities and research institutes across Canada, USA, UK, Germany, Korea, Hungary, Russia, Australia, Nigeria, Turkey, Finland, and Mauritius. Key collaborations include multiple MoUs with the University of Saskatchewan (Canada), University of Calgary (Canada), Loughborough University (UK), Coventry University (UK), North Carolina University (USA), North Dakota State University (USA), Jeonbuk National University (Korea), OTH Amberg-Weiden (Germany), Hiroshima University (Japan), Eötvös Loránd University (Hungary), and others. These MoUs facilitate student and faculty exchange, joint research projects, academic mobility programs, and collaborative teaching initiatives, strengthening MNIT Jaipur’s global academic footprint.

== Administration ==
=== Organisational structure ===
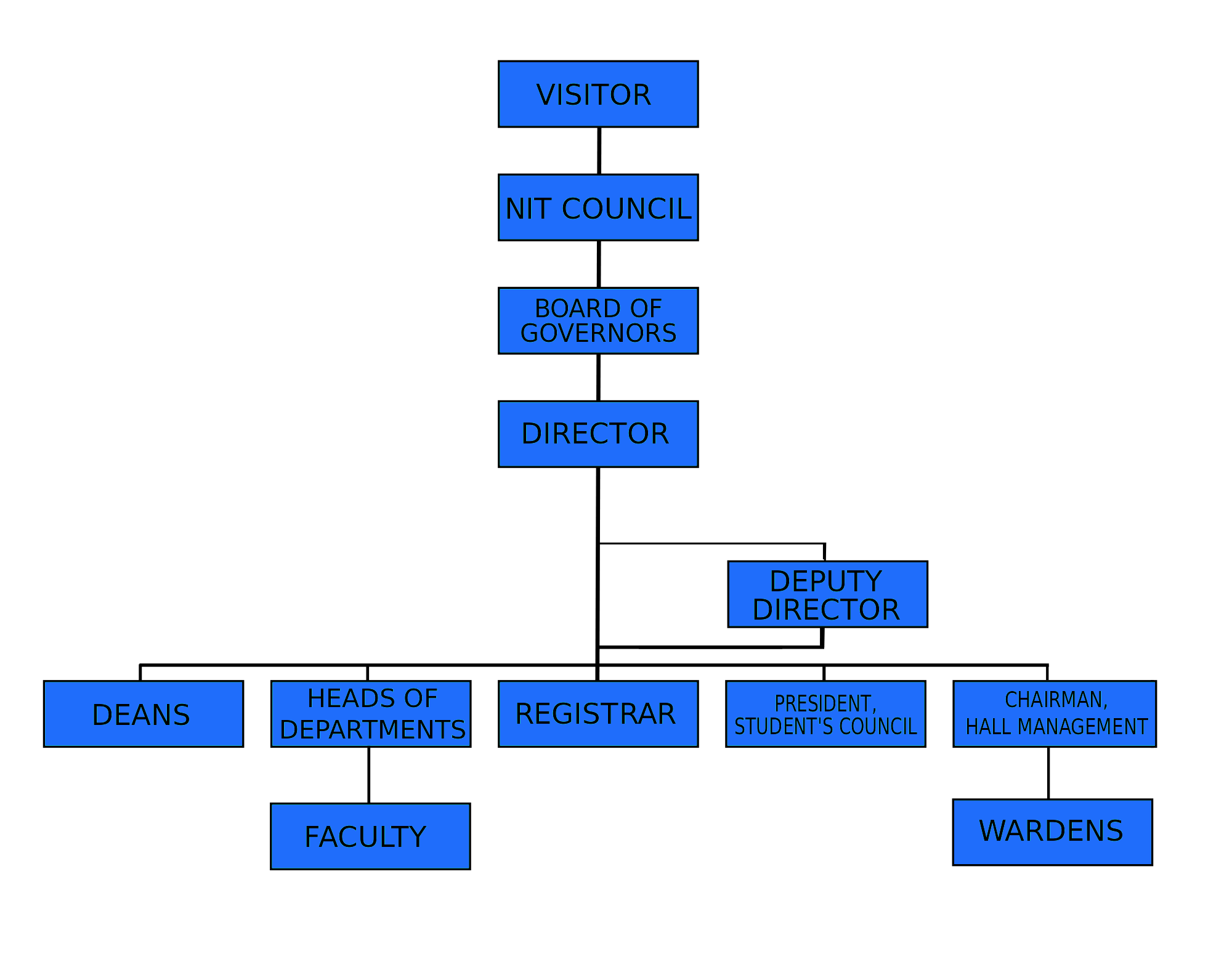
Organisational structure of the MNIT

MNIT shares a common Visitor (a position held by the President of India) who is the most powerful person in the NIT organizational structure and the NIT Council with the other sister NITs.

The board of governors consists of members nominated by the NIT Council, the director, representatives from the Department of Higher Education, Ministry of Human Resource and Development, and Government of India.

The institute's director serves as the chief academic and executive officer of the institute. He is aided by the deputy director. Under the director and the deputy director are the deans, heads of departments, registrar, president of the students' council, and chairman of the hall management committee.

The registrar is the chief administrative officer and oversees day-to-day operations. He is the custodian of records, funds, and other properties of the institute.

Under the charge of the heads of departments (HODs) are the faculty (full-time professors as well as those of associate and assistant status). The wardens of hostels are placed under the chairman of the hall management committee in the organization.

=== Financing ===
Annually, the institute receives US$20 million from the Government of India and the World Bank. Alumni and other bodies also donate to contribute to the development of the institute. Financial management is undertaken by the Financial Committee of the institute.

=== Academic policies ===
The academic policies of the institute are decided by its senate. It consists of the deans of the institute, all the professors, the director, educationists, and specialists. The senate controls and approves the curriculum, courses, examinations, and results and appoints committees to look into academic matters. The teaching, training, and research activities of the institute are reviewed by the senate to maintain educational standards. The director serves as the ex-officio and chairman of the senate.

=== Academic Events ===
MNIT Jaipur AICTE – Training Program on Design Thinking for Innovative Medical Devices

== Motto ==
"Yogaḥ Karmasu Kauśalam" (योगः कर्मसु कौशलम् in Sanskrit). The motto literally translates to "Excellence in action is Yoga" essentially implying that doing your work well is (true) yoga or "Diligence leads to Excellence". It is sourced to Sri Krishna's discourse to Arjuna in Bhagavad Gita, Chapter 2, Verse 50. This quote in its larger context of Gita urges man to acquire equanimity because such a soul endowed with the mind of equanimity allows him to shed the effects of his good and evil deeds in this world itself. Equanimity is the source of perfection in Karmic endeavors while leading to Salvation.

== Departments, Centres and Schools ==
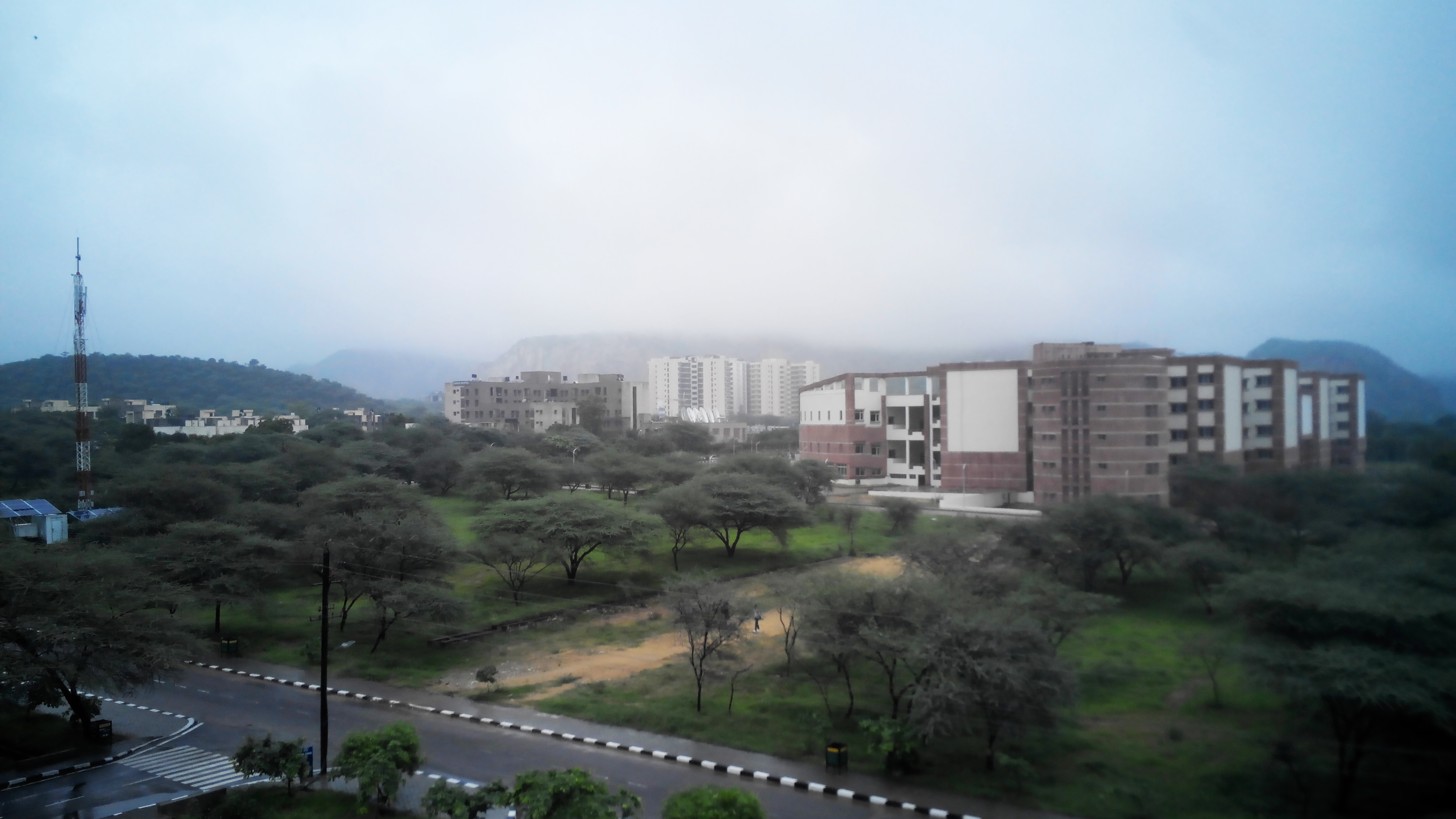
Malaviya National Institute of Technology Sky View

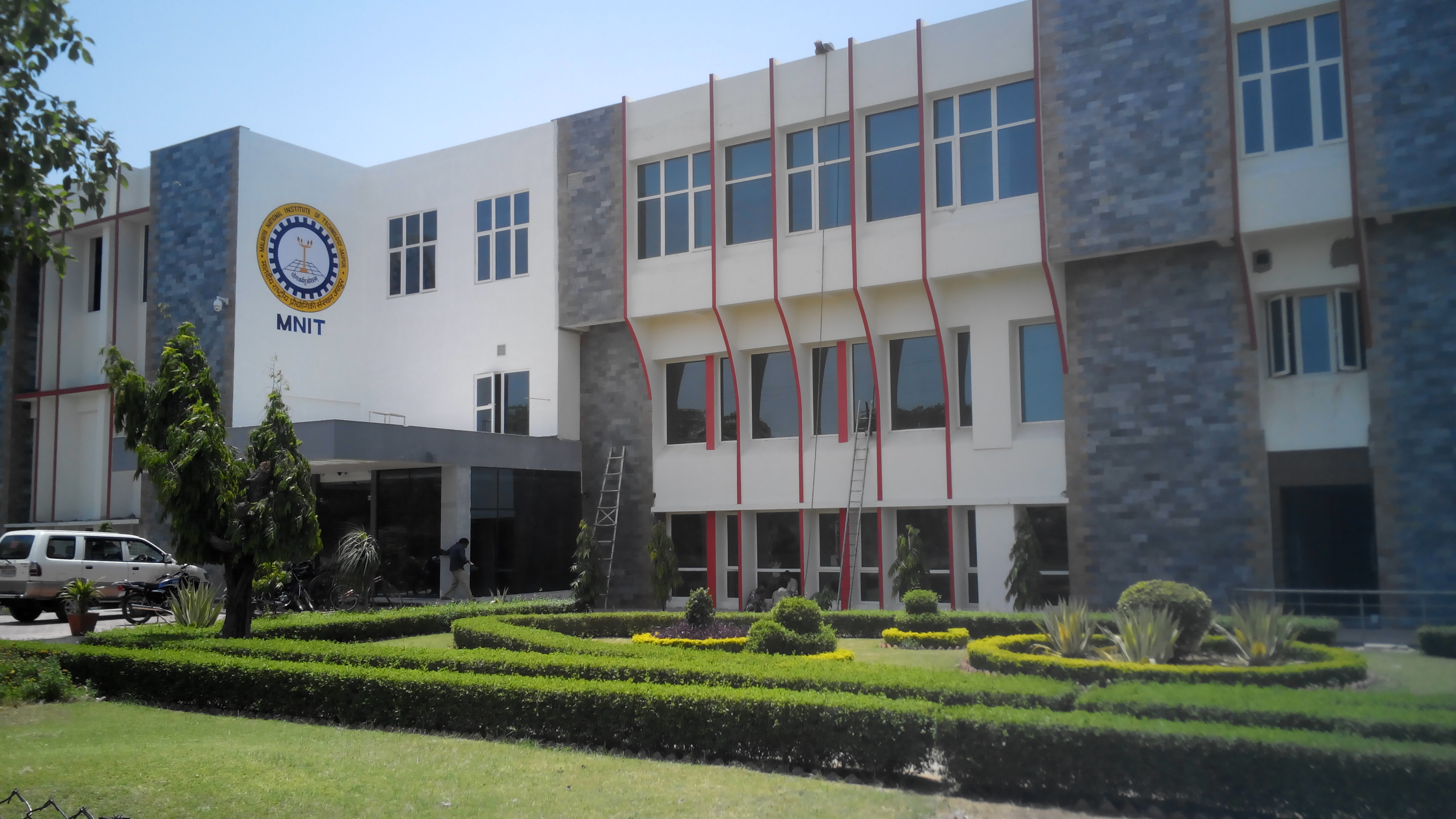
Placement and Training Cell

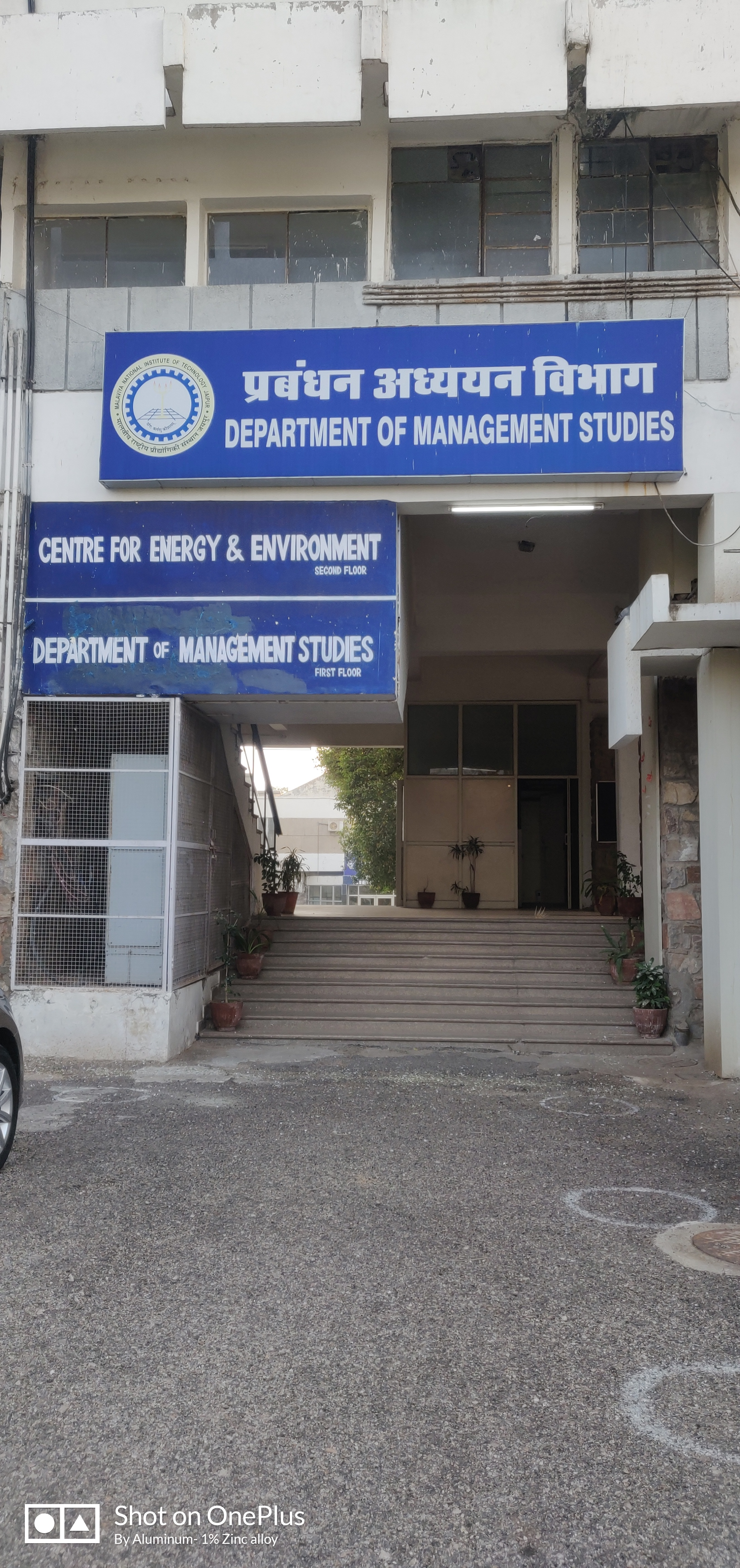
MNIT Management Department

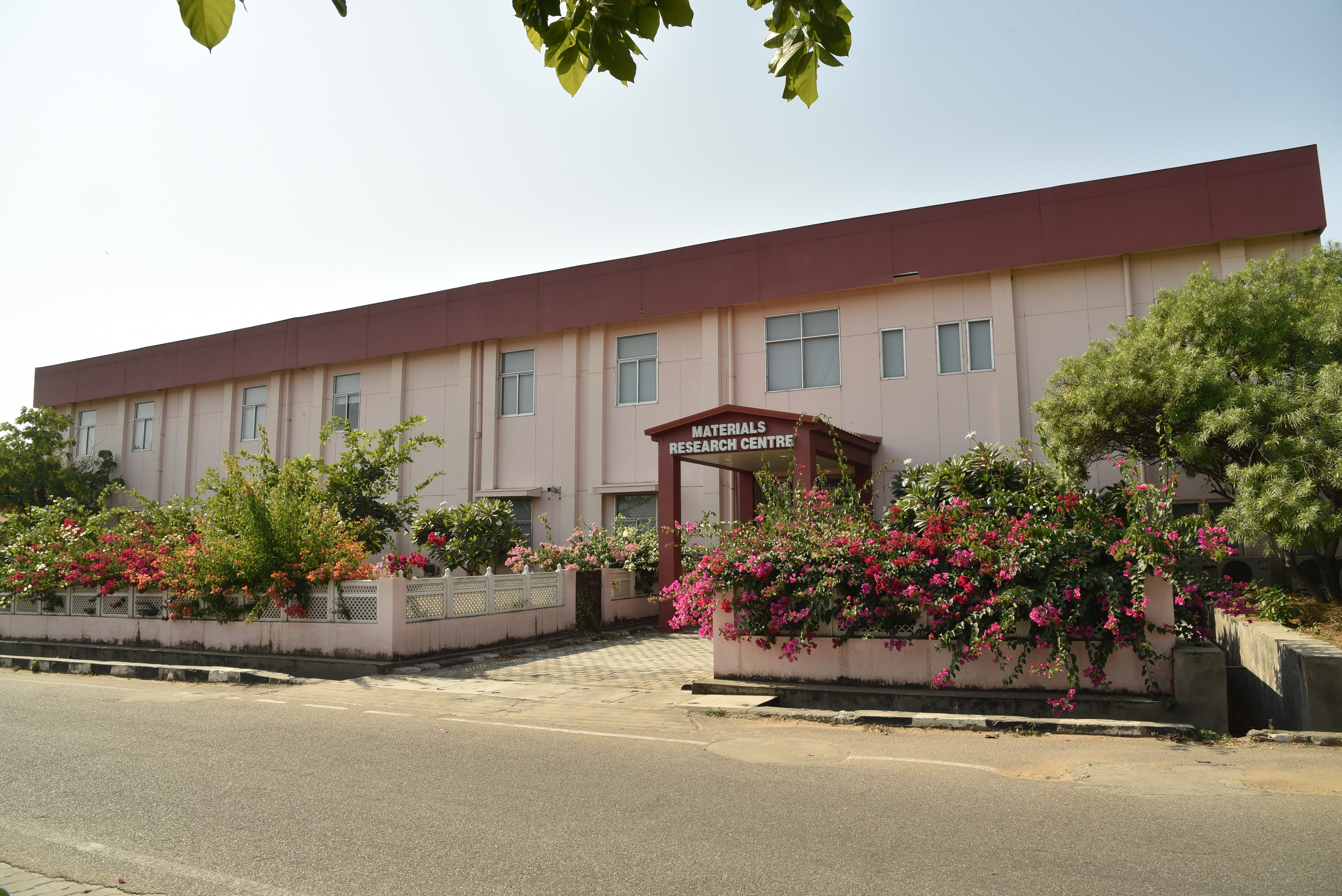
Material Research Centre

=== Engineering departments ===
- Architecture and Planning
- Artificial Intelligence & Data Engineering
- Chemical Engineering
- Civil Engineering
- Computer Science & Engineering
- Electrical Engineering
- Electronics and Communication Engineering
- Mechanical Engineering
- Metallurgical and Materials Engineering

=== Centers ===
- Energy and Environment
- Materials research center
- National Centre for Disaster Mitigation & Management
- Centre for Rural Development
- Centre for Cyber Security
- Continuing and Digital Education Center
- E & ICT academy

=== Science Departments ===
- Applied Biology
- Mathematics
- Physics (Photonics and Electronics )
- Chemistry

=== Allied Departments ===
- Humanities and Social Sciences
- Department of Physical Education
- Department of Management Studies

== Campus ==
MNIT's 317-acre campus is located in Jaipur, Rajasthan, approximately 2.5 miles (4 km) from Jaipur International Airport. It is 6 miles (10 km) from Pink City and is within walking distance of the business district therefore the two locations are frequent gateways for MNIT students. The vast campus is lush green and has a hill out of Aravali Ranges. Numerous buildings, and clusters constitute the campus. To the west are the departmental buildings, research laboratories, associations and club buildings, lecture theatres, bank (ICICI Bank), post office, canteens, lawns, auditoriums, main building, computer centre; to the east are Boys hostels, STP; to the north are guest houses, staff quarters, bank (SBI, ICICI); at the center and south are sports facilities and dispensary.

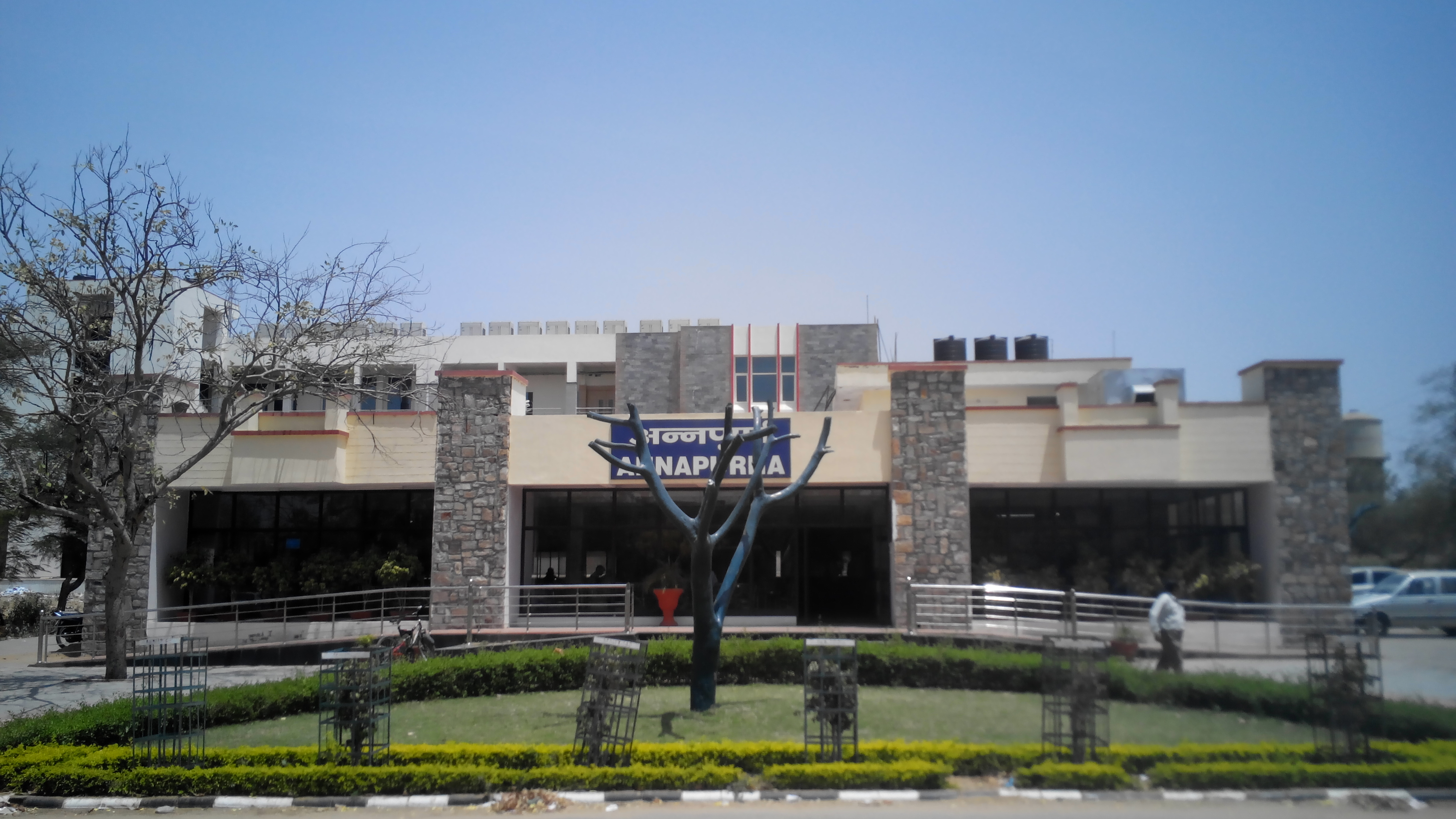
Annapoorna- Central Canteen

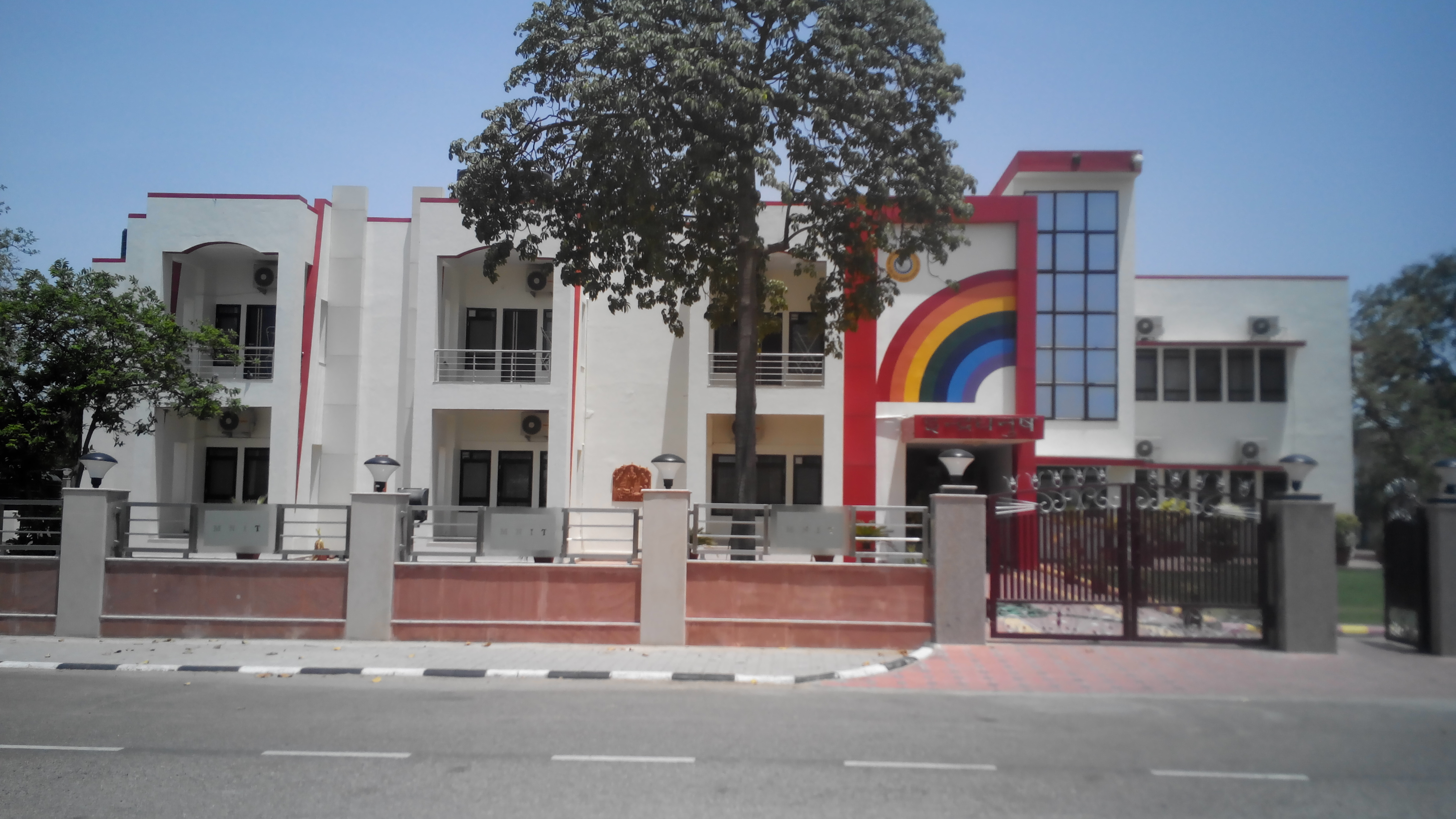
Guest House 1

The dispensary is supervised by a team of Medical Officers and supported staff. The institute has a part-time Homeopathic doctor and Ayurvedic doctor on the campus. Canteen buildings, five in all, are near the instructional zone and hostels and in addition to it, an Amul parlor. The central canteen is run by Akshaya Patra Foundation. There are two guest houses on the campus for visitors, alumni, guests, and guardians of students.

Each Department has its own building which has laboratories, staff cabins, lecture halls, classrooms, auditoriums, departmental libraries, etc., and all are linked via a continuous gallery that runs throughout the eastern part.

=== Sports facilities ===
Facilities for sports and games include a soccer ground, a cricket ground with nets, three basketball courts, three lawn tennis courts, three volleyball courts, three raw volleyball courts, one indoor badminton court and other outdoor badminton courts, a gymnasium, a billiards room, a chess room, a jogging track, table tennis boards, and a swimming pool is in future plans.

=== Materials Research Center ===
Materials Research Center (MRC) has the infrastructure for advanced research in various streams with a focus on materials. The facilities are extended to the scientists and researchers of other institutes. Equipment at the center, set up at the cost of $6.3 million, offers a wide range of research assistance. Various machines, facilities and software are available in the lab.

=== Central Library ===
Now known as LEARNING RESOURCE CENTRE (LRC), aids the teaching and research programmes of the institute and provides facilities for general reading and information with 156,314 print books, 3,073 ebooks, 10,000 e-journals, international journals, technical pamphlets, standards, CD-ROMs and periodicals. In addition, it is connected to other library networks like DELNET, which enables students to access libraries of other 4697 Indian and International libraries. It is spread across a plinth area of 15,847 Sq. feet. The services and operations in the library are fully digital with RFID and Smart card systems with Koha (software). In addition to books, it offers Wi-Fi and LAN services.

=== Computer Center ===
The centre has 10 computer laboratories. A Datacenter with Private Cloud using VMWare V Cloud Suite 5 and 64 TB of EMC2 Storage has also been established in the center. The Private Cloud has features of automated provisioning of IT resources, a single interface for administrators for the entire IT infrastructure, and workload elasticity. It is used for Library digitization, E-mail archival, hosting various services/applications and Research on cloud computing by Ph.D. and MTech students.

=== Vivekananda Lecture Theatre Complex (VLTC) ===
Vivekananda Lecture Hall complex will have 40 classrooms that could accommodate about 5,500 students at a time. It will have a food court in its basement. Its construction was started on 19 September 2012. It holds the record of being Asia's Largest Lecture Theatre Complex.

Among other facilities, each hostel is equipped with Wi-fi and/or LAN, and a common room with a TV, LAN, table-tennis court, newspaper stands and a mess.

== Student life ==
Annually MNIT conducts the MNIT Sports Tournament (MST). Students from all across Rajasthan and other parts of North India, participate in the event. MNIT also hosts inter-NIT sports tournaments being a part of the Inter-NIT sports federation. The institute is the West zone centre for NBA JAM.

National level events include Neuron, Blitzschlag, Electronica, Moments, MST, Schrifftum, Taal and Zodiac.

=== Hostel ===
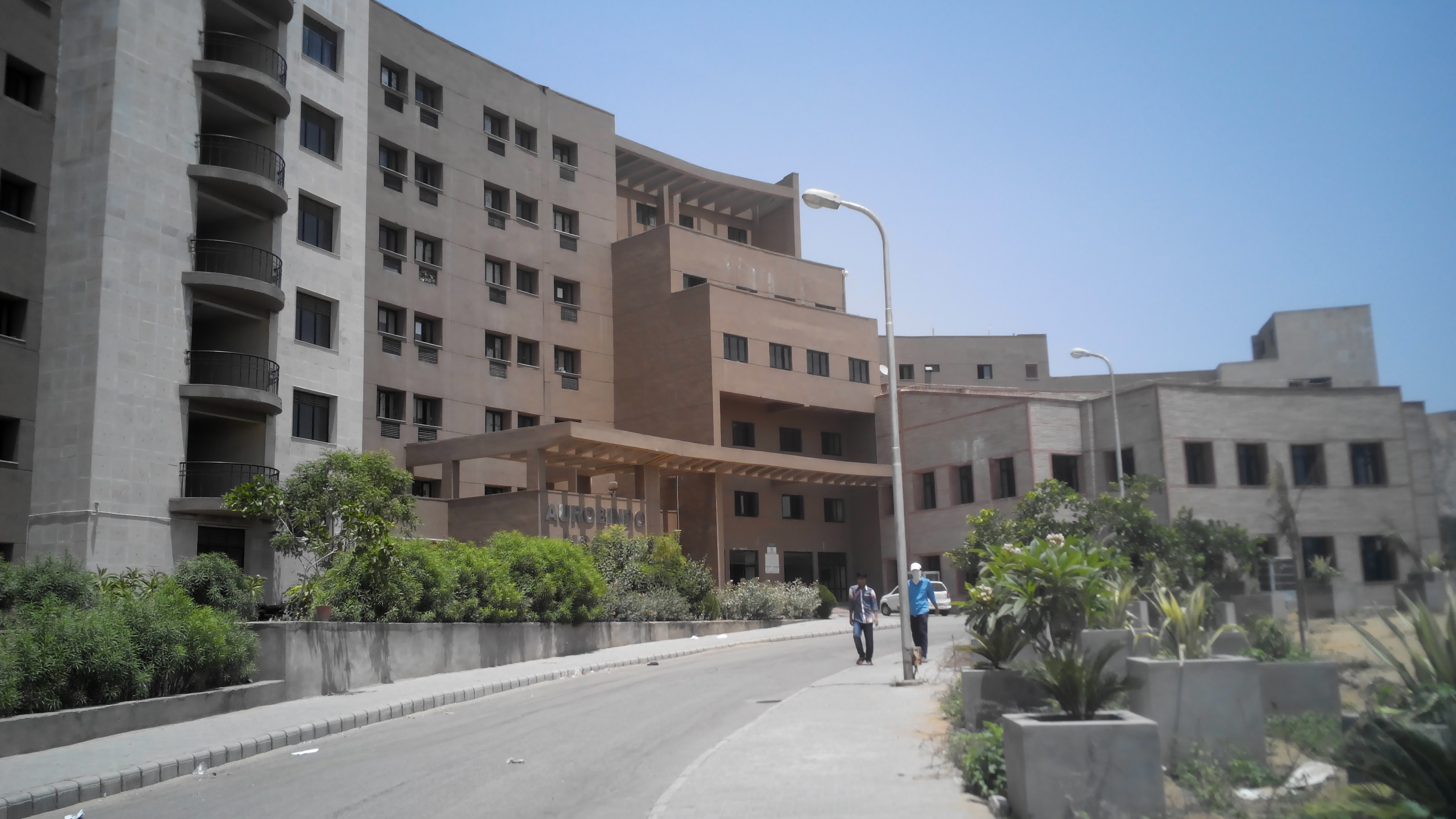
Hostel No. 9 (Aurobindo Hostel)

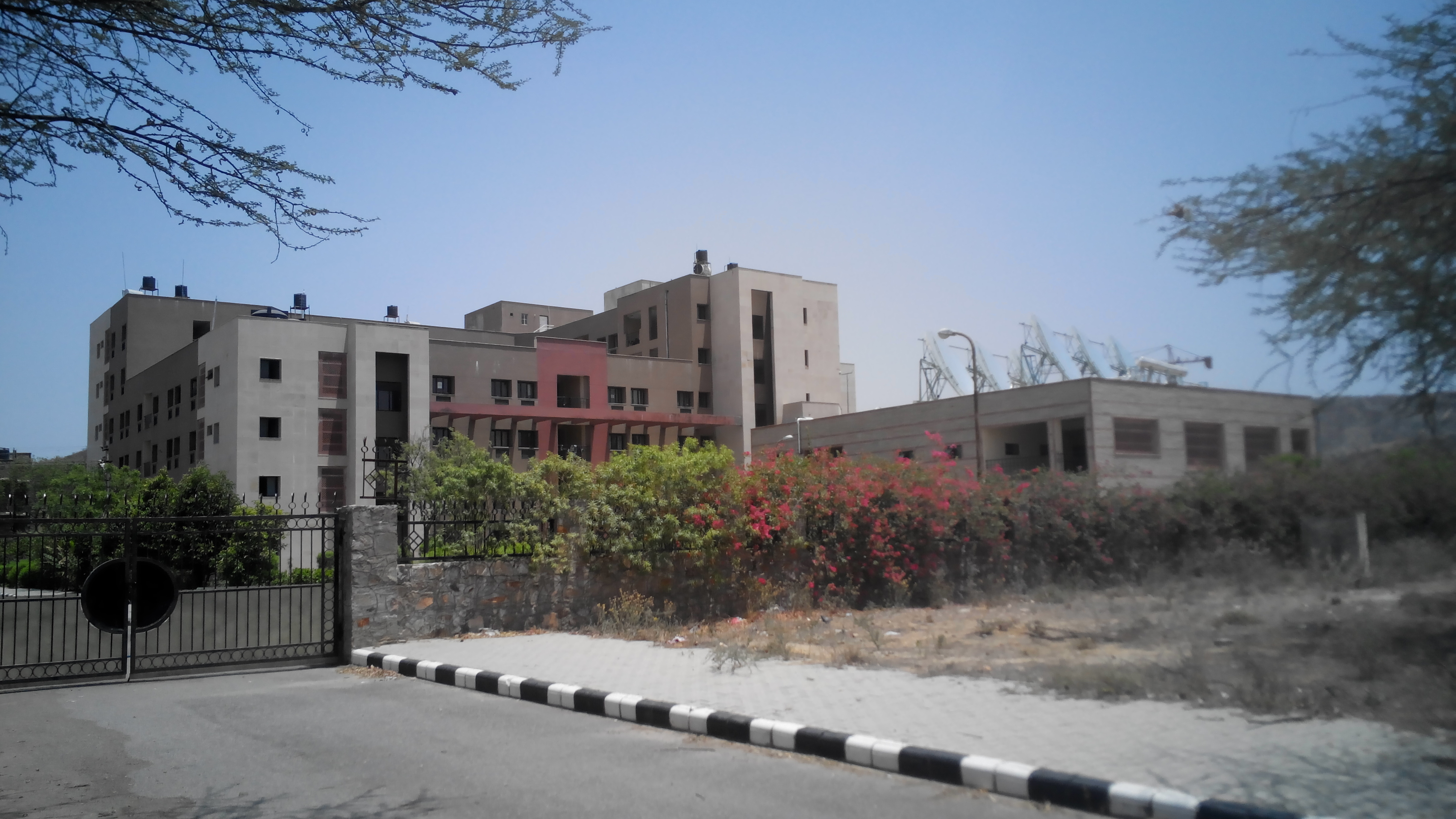
Gargi Hostel for Girls

MNIT has 10 boys and 2 girls hostels with an accommodation capacity of about 3,000 students. The largest among them is Aurobindo Hostel comprising 950 single bedrooms. First-year students are allotted triple bedrooms and from second Year onwards everyone gets single bedrooms. Most of the hostels are equipped with the mess. Students are given Wi-Fi, LAN, common room, and sports facilities in hostels.

=== Blitzschlag ===
Blitzschlag is the annual cultural fest of MNIT Jaipur. It is a 3-day event held towards the start of February every year and attracts a crowd of over 20,000 students from more than 20 colleges all over the country.

The word Blitzschlag has German origins; it means a lightning strike. Aimed at inspiring innovation, technical interest among students, and awareness among the public, the event has played host to lectures, seminars, workshops, competitions, exhibitions, and quizzes.

The event is organized by the students under the guidance of their teachers.

=== Sphinx ===
Sphinx is the annual tech-fest organized autonomously by Malaviya National Institute of Technology, a 3-day event held in late October each year. The event is organized by the students under the guidance of their teachers.

=== Creative Arts & Cultural Society ===
MNIT CACS (Creative Arts & Cultural Society) allows students to exhibit extracurricular abilities.

=== Student Mentorship Program ===
Student Mentorship Program (SMP) is a program of mentorship of junior students by senior students. Web based services consist of The Online Mentor-Mentee platform and SMP Media. Online Mentor-Mentee platform connects mentees with their Mentors, and SMP Media acts as a knowledge sharing platform.

=== MNIT Innovation and Incubation Center (MIIC) ===
MNIT Innovation & Incubation Center (MIIC) in Jaipur is a Technology Business Incubator (TBI) established by DST, Govt. of India to promote and nurture entrepreneurship. MIIC provides support and an environment for developing knowledge-based businesses among students, faculty, and aspiring entrepreneurs in Rajasthan. It fosters a culture of innovation and offers incubation services to youth with innovative ideas, helping them transform concepts into viable businesses. MIIC focuses on three main areas: product and process design, material and process innovation, and ICT. Currently, MIIC incubates six startups and hosts over 20 students developing their business ideas in its co-working space. The center actively collaborates with colleges, universities, and entrepreneurship development organizations across Rajasthan to extend its services and support innovative ideas throughout the region.

=== The Mavericks ===
The Mavericks is the weekly newsletter service, run by a group of students which covers all activities going on on the campus, both academic and non-academic, discussing ongoing placements, internships, achievements by students, events, projects and other happenings on the campus.

=== Codavids ===
Codavids is the official programming and coding club of the institute, under the Head of the Computer Engineering Department. It aims to improve the programming culture among the student community and encourage them to solve practical problems through coding, improve their programming skills by taking lectures, organizing Online Coding Competitions (OCC) every month, organizing Guest lectures in algorithm complexity, algorithms, data structures, operating systems and programming in general.

=== Zine ===
Zine is a creative group of engineering undergraduates of Malaviya National Institute of Technology, Jaipur who are together to learn, improve and apply their technical skills to help foster the growth of society and India in the field of technology by using their engineering skills to work on real time problems. It is composed of students from various disciplines working under guidance of Dr. Rajesh Kumar from Electrical Engineering department and various alumni working in reputed firms and doing research in Universities in India and abroad.

=== Housing ===
MNIT provides on-campus residential facilities to its students, research scholars, faculty members, and many of its staff. Hostel rooms are wired for the internet, for which students pay a compulsory charge included in the hostel fees. Most of the rooms in the hostels are designed to accommodate one student and is available after the first year, and there are hostels designed for triple bedding which are leased to students of the first year. Some hostels have Wi-fi networks. There are twelve hostels in all, and each hostel is provided with a common room equipped with a television, table tennis board, and newspaper reading section. Students residing in hostels are issued an advisory code of conduct and ragging or harassing other students, and juniors are strictly forbidden.

== Notable alumni ==
- Thomas Abraham, president of GOPIO
- Avinash Kumar Agarwal, Mechanical Engineer, Shanti Swarup Bhatnagar laureate
- Nikhil Gupta, researcher and professor based in Brooklyn, New York
- Ashok M. Raichur, nanotechnologist, N-Bios laureate
- Shivangi Singh, Indian Navy First Woman Pilot
- Shekhar Bhansali, division director in Electrical, Communication and Cyber Systems (ECCS) at the National Science Foundation.

== See also ==
- National Institutes of Technology
- Indian Institutes of Technology
- Ministry of Human Resource Development
- List of Institutes of National Importance
