= Malviya Nagar (Rajasthan) =

Area of Jaipur

Malviya Nagar is a region in south Jaipur, Rajasthan, and one of the constituencies of Jaipur district. It is close to Durgapura, Jawahar Nagar, Jagatpura and Sanganer. The region is named after the freedom fighter Madan Mohan Malviya. Malviya Nagar is one of the poshest and upmarket locations of Jaipur. Malviya Nagar has the city's best restaurants, malls and many attractions. The PIN code of Malviya Nagar is 302017.

== Economy ==
- Genpact BPO
- World Trade Park, Jaipur
- Malviya nagar riico

== Notable sites ==
- Jawahar Circle

== Hospitals ==
- Apex Hospital
- Calgary Eye Hospital
- Fortis Healthcare
- EHCC Hospital
- Shree Hospital

== Transport ==
Malviya Nagar is connected through the public transport system of minibus, low floor bus and by rikshaw.

== Education ==
=== Schools ===
- St. Anselm's Pink City Sr. Sec. School
- Jaipuriya Vidyalaya
- Kendriya Vidyalaya
- St Edmunds school Malviya Nagar Jaipur
- Government Girls school
- M.N.Morden public school
- Neerja Modi School

=== Colleges ===
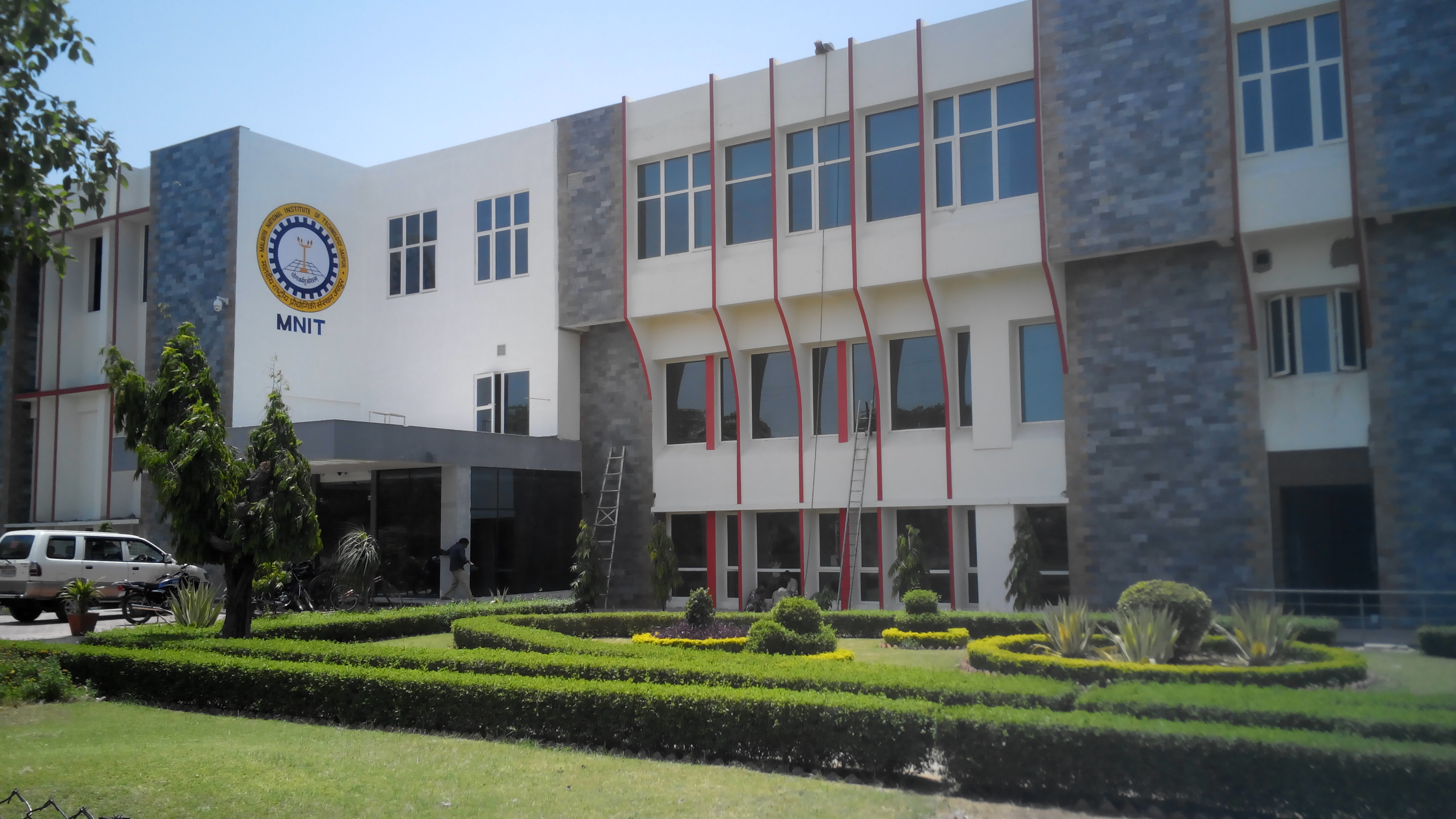
Malaviya National Institute of Technology Jaipur

Malviya Nagar is home to Malviya National Institute of Technology Jaipur MNIT, an autonomous institution in western India of national importance. It is one of the 31 N.I.T.s in the country.

- Malviya National Institute of Technology
- BIT Mesra, Jaipur Campus
- Dr. B Lal institute of biotechnology
