= World Trade Park, Jaipur =

Shopping center in Jaipur, India

World Trade Park
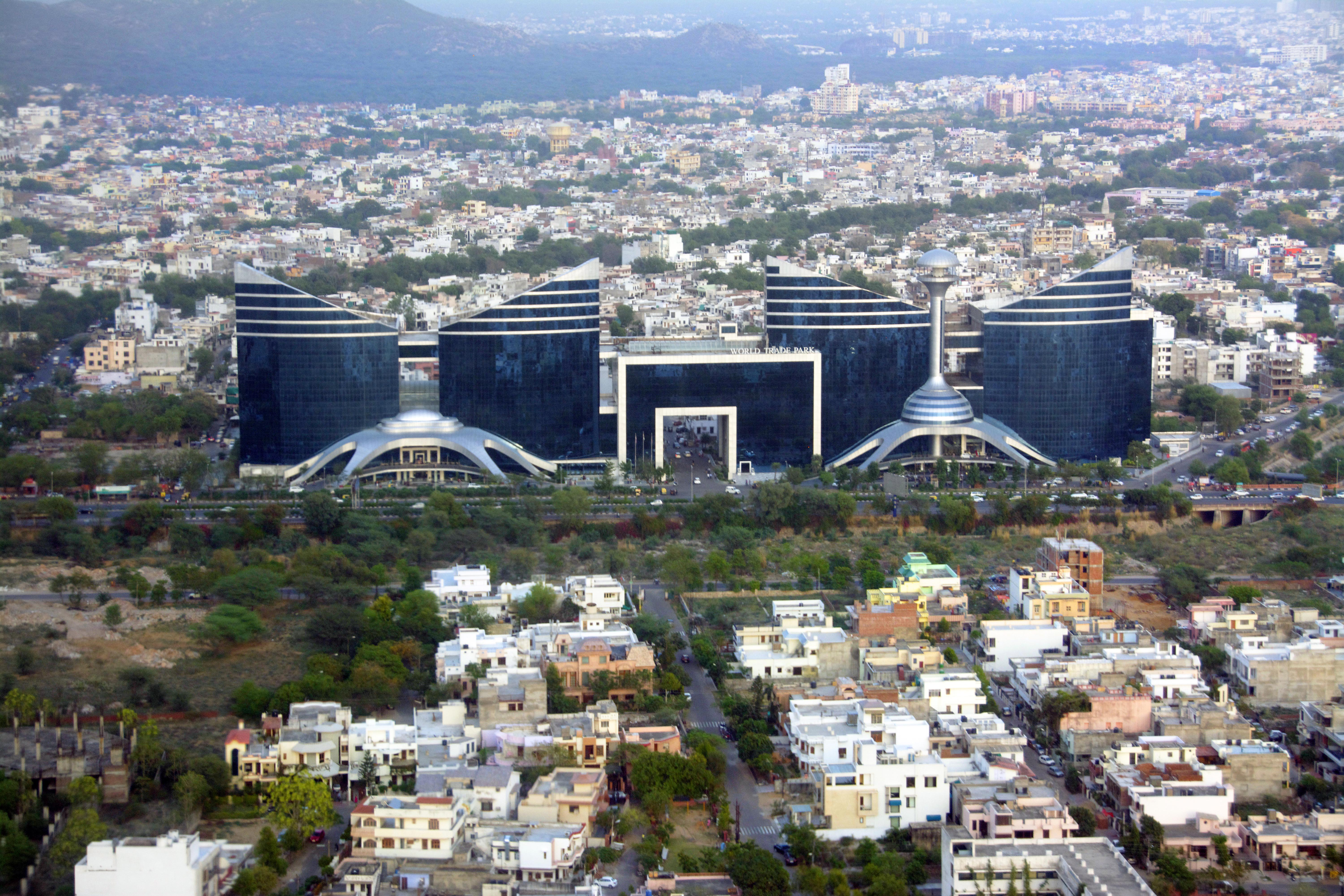
- Location: Jaipur, Rajasthan
- Coordinates: 26.8534°N 75.8051°E
- Address: Jawahar Lal Nehru Marg, Malviya Nagar, Jaipur
- Opened: 2012; 14 years ago
- Architect: Sincere Architects Private Limited
- Num. of stores: 200+
- Floor area: 1,300,000 sq ft (120,000 m^{2}) (approx)
- Floors: 5 (including basement)
- Parking: 3000 cars
- Website: www.wtpjaipur.com

World Trade Park is a shopping mall in Malviya Nagar, Jaipur, (Pinkcity of India) Rajasthan, India. It was officially opened in the later half of 2012. It is popular among young people who go there for shopping in Zara, Cromā, Sephora among others.

== Construction ==
Construction of the World Trade Park Jaipur started in 2009, cost $50,000,000 and was completed in two years. The building has two different blocks; one north and one south, separated by a city street. The two buildings are joined by a bridge, which has restaurants.

Dr Anoop Bartaria is the chairman and managing director of World Trade Park and Sincere Group of companies. World Trade Park Jaipur was inaugurated by Shah Rukh Khan in 2012.

World Trade Park Jaipur includes a display system where 24 projectors create a single image on its ceiling. WTP was awarded "Mall of the Year" and "Best Architecture" by BCI of India.

As of 2023, Several more projects are under construction in the WTP, such as an underwater restaurant, an auditorium, a banquet hall, as well as a hotel with "world class luxury rooms".

== Gallery ==
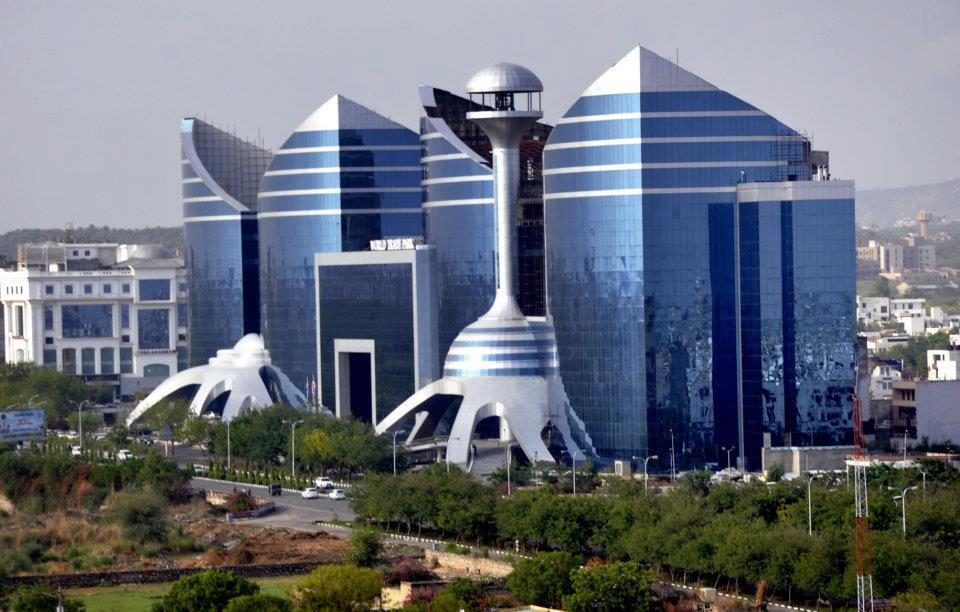

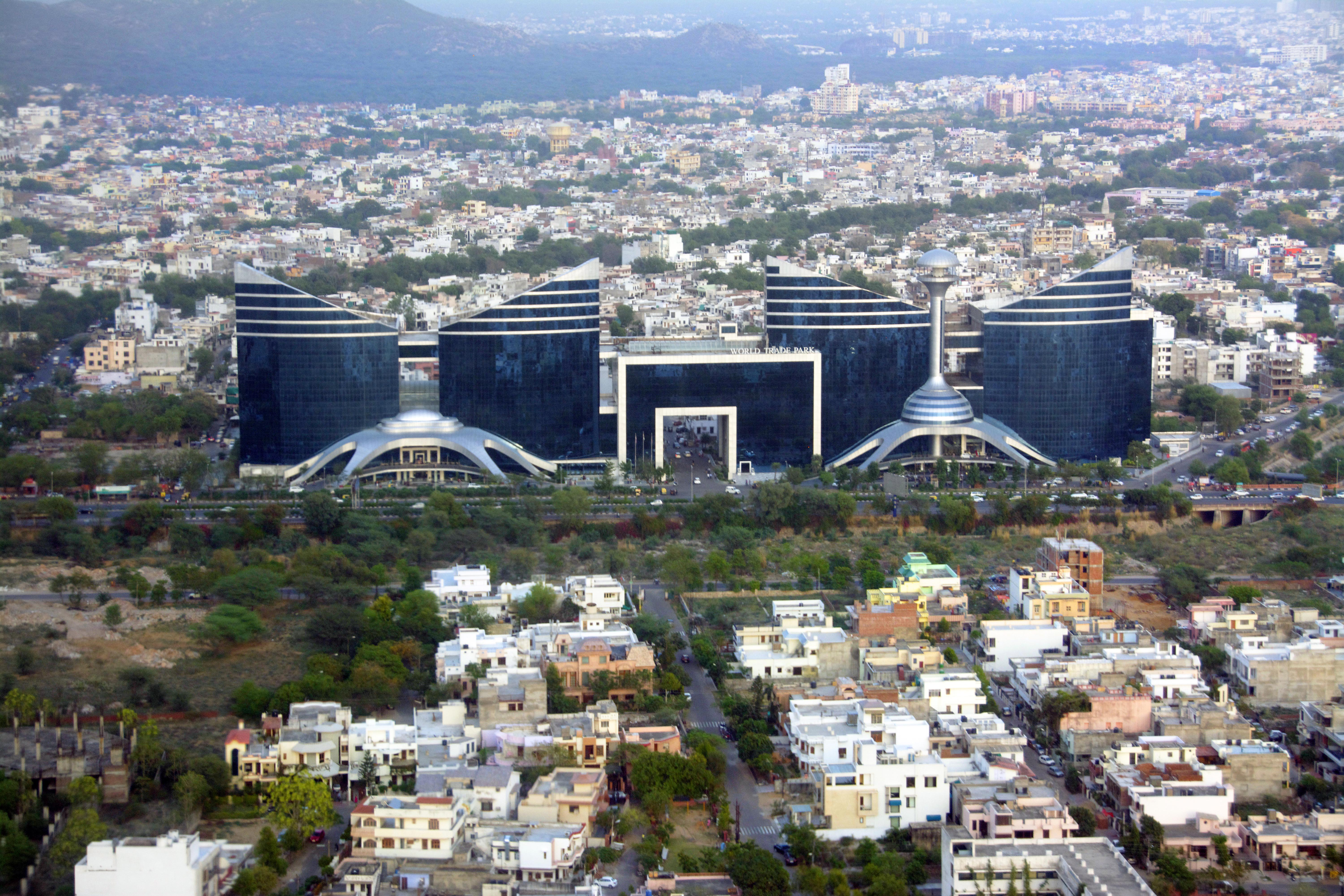

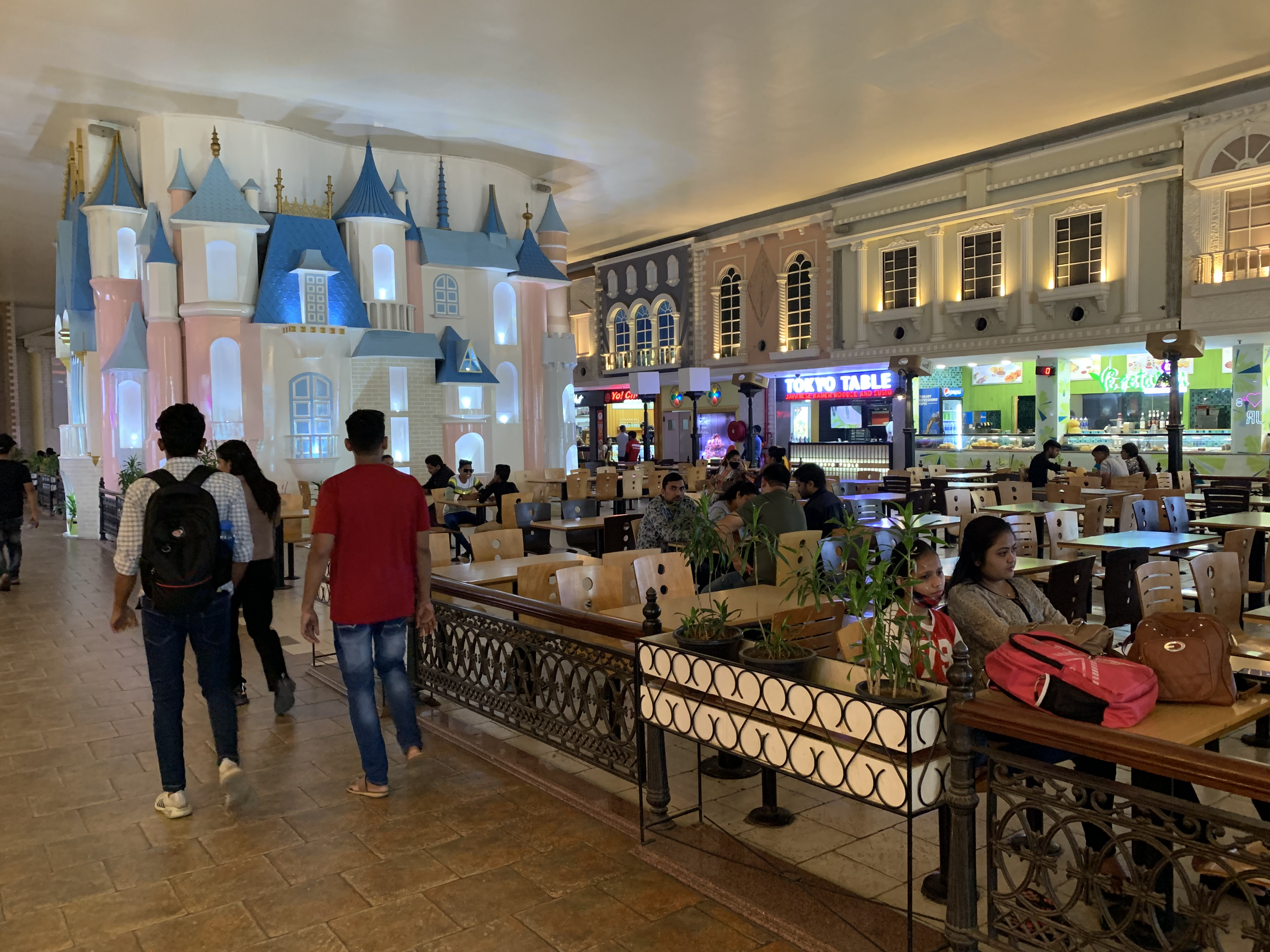

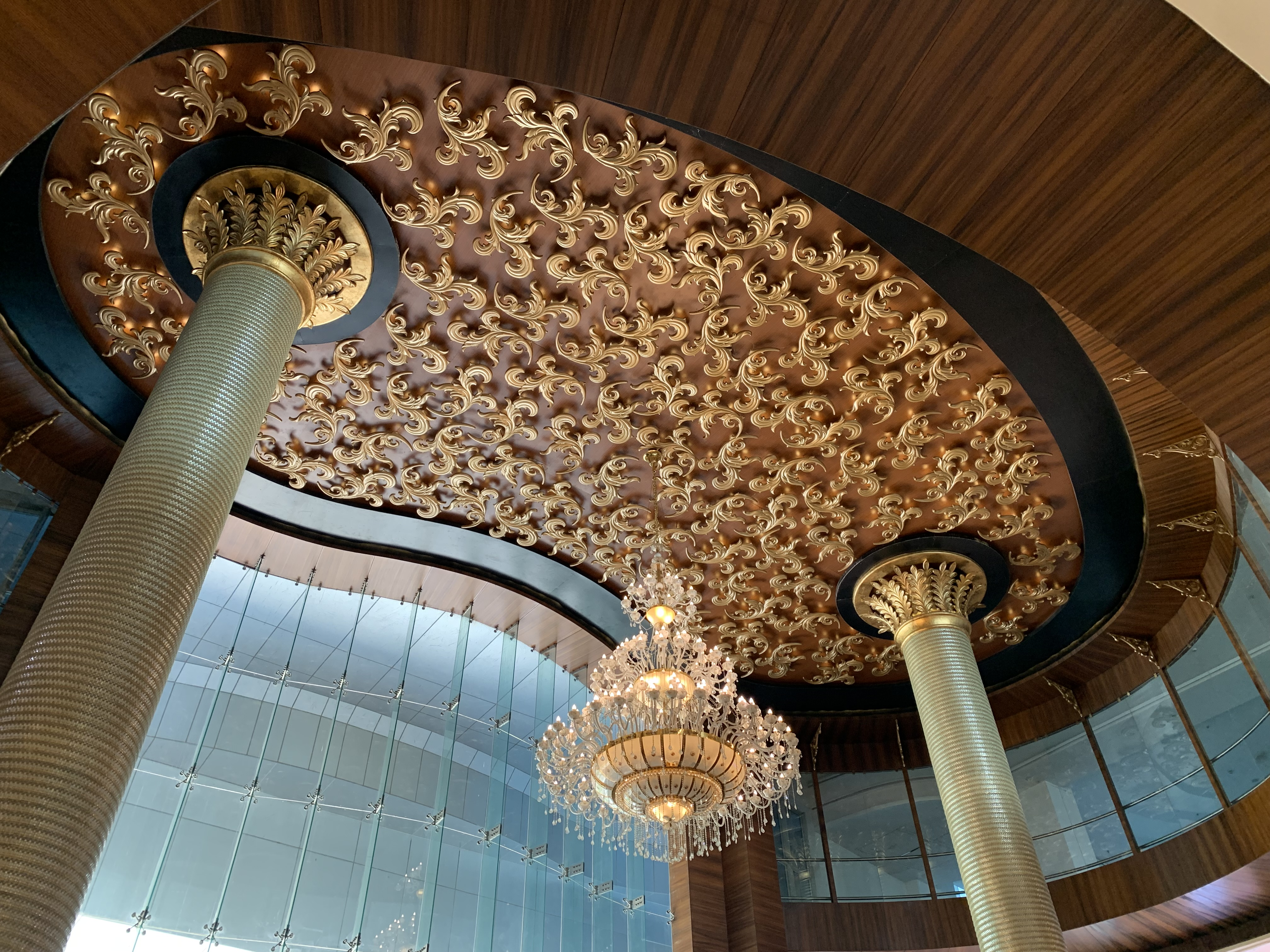

== WTP Hotel ==
WTP Hotel is currently under construction.
