= Ashok M. Raichur =

Indian materials scientist

- Born: 8 April 1966 (age 60); India
- Education: Malaviya National Institute of Technology, Jaipur; University of Kentucky; University of Nevada, Reno
- Known for: Studies on nanostructured capsules
- Awards: 2003 DBT Biotech Process Development and Commercialization Award; 2003 MoSM National Metallurgists Day Award; 2005 GoK Prof. Satish Dhawan Young Engineers Award; 2007 MRSI Medal; 2009 N-BIOS Prize
- Scientific career
- Fields: Materials engineering
- Workplaces: Indian Institute of Science; University of South Africa; University of Johannesburg
- Website: materials.iisc.ac.in/~amr/Welcome.html

Ashok M. Raichur is an Indian materials scientist, nanotechnologist and a professor at the Department of Materials Engineering of the Indian Institute of Science, Bangalore. Known for his studies on the use of nanotechnology for biomedical and environmental applications, Raichur is a former Alexander von Humboldt Fellow and a life member of the National Academy of Sciences, India. The Department of Biotechnology of the Government of India awarded him the National Bioscience Award for Career Development, one of the highest Indian science awards, for his contributions to biosciences, in 2009.

== Biography ==
Raichur graduated in engineering from Malaviya Regional Engineering College in 1990 and earned an MS at the University of Kentucky in 1992. His doctoral studies were at the University of Nevada, Reno and after securing a PhD in 1996, he worked at the same institution for his post-doctoral work as a research associate.

In 1997, Raichur joined the Indian Institute of Science (IISc) as an assistant professor at the department of materials engineering in 1997 where he holds the position of a professor since 2009, while serving as an associate faculty of the Bioengineering Program as well as the Interdisciplinary Centre for Water Research (ICWaR) of IISc. In between, he served the IISc as an associate professor from 2003 to 2009, as an associate faculty of the Materials Research Center during 2007–10 and as the associate chairman of the Center for Scientific and Industrial Consultancy from 2006 to 2011. He is also a Professor at the University of South Africa and a former visiting professor at the University of Johannesburg (2012–14).

== Legacy ==
Raichur's research focuses on biomedical and environmental applications of nanotechnology and he leads a group of scientists at IISc who are involved in the development of polyelectrolyte capsules for gene and drug delivery and nanostructured multilayers for sensing applications, nanoparticle synthesis and their dispersions with the help of biosurfactants. In 2014, he led the team that developed a nanocapsule made of biopolymers which was capable of delivering drugs at specific target sites, such as cancer cells. The drug delivery system developed by them was composed of a drug molecule that resisted premature release or degradation and released the drug at target site with the help of local physiological cues. It was reported that the capsule walls had a cross-linked layer by layer assembly which enabled it to hold large quantities of drugs. He has also developed a catalytic method for cleaning water using nanoparticles which destroyed the organic contaminants in the water. Besides, he has contributed chapters to books.

Raichur is a member of the PI Committee of the National Programme on Technology Enhance Learning (NPTEL), an educational project funded by the Ministry of Human Resource Development of the Government of India. He is a life member of the National Academy of Sciences, India, the Association of Separation Scientists and Technologists (ASSET), and the Materials Research Society of India.

== Awards ==
Raichur received the Biotech Process Development and Commercialization Award of the Department of Biotechnology in 2003, the same year as he received the National Metallurgists Day Award of the Ministry of Steel and Mines of the Government of India. He held Alexander von Humboldt Fellowship during 2004–05 and was selected for the Prof. Satish Dhawan Young Engineers Award by the Government of Karnataka in 2005. Two years later, he received the 2007 MRSI Medal of the Materials Research Society of India. The Department of Biotechnology (DBT) of the Government of India awarded him the National Bioscience Award for Career Development, one of the highest Indian science awards in 2009.

== Selected bibliography ==
=== Chapters ===
- Mamadou S. Diallo; Neil A. Fromer; Myung S. Jhon (16 April 2014). Nanotechnology for Sustainable Development. Springer Science & Business. pp. 89–. ISBN 978-3-319-05041-6.

=== Articles ===
- Radhakrishnan, Krishna; Tripathy, Jasaswini; Datey, Akshay; Chakravortty, Dipshikha; Raichur, Ashok M. (5 March 2015). "Mesoporous silica–chondroitin sulphate hybrid nanoparticles for targeted and bio-responsive drug delivery" (PDF). New Journal of Chemistry. 39 (3): 1754–1760. doi:10.1039/c4nj01430h. ISSN 1369-9261.
- Raichur, Ashok; Thomas; Radhakrishnan; Gnanadhas; Chakravortty, Dipshikha (11 January 2013). "Intracellular delivery of doxorubicin encapsulated in novel pH-responsive chitosan/heparin nanocapsules". International Journal of Nanomedicine. 8 (1): 267–273. doi:10.2147/ijn.s37737. PMC 3548417. PMID 23345974.
- Anandhakumar, S.; Vijayalakshmi, S. P.; Jagadeesh, G.; Raichur, Ashok M. (28 September 2011). "Silver Nanoparticle Synthesis: Novel Route for Laser Triggering of Polyelectrolyte Capsules". ACS Applied Materials & Interfaces. 3 (9): 3419–3424. doi:10.1021/am200651t. ISSN 1944-8244. PMID 21861501.

== See also ==
- Drug delivery
- Biomolecule
