= Nikhil Gupta =

Indian American materials scientist

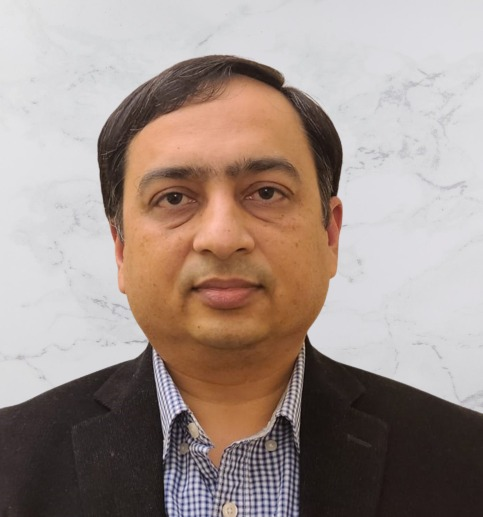
- Education: Malaviya National Institute of Technology-Jaipur, Bachelor of Engineering; Indian Institute of Science, Master of Engineering in Metallurgical Engineering; Louisiana State University, PhD in Engineering Science
- Known for: Magnesium-alloy syntactic foam
- Awards: Fellow, ASM International; Fellow, American Society for Composites; ASM 2013 Silver Medal, TMS 2013 Young Leader Professional Development Award
- Scientific career
- Fields: Mechanical and Aerospace Engineering
- Workplaces: New York University Tandon School of Engineering

Nikhil Gupta is a materials scientist, researcher, and professor based in Brooklyn, New York. Gupta is a professor at New York University Tandon School of Engineering department of mechanical and aerospace engineering. He is an elected Fellow of ASM International and the American Society for Composites. He is one of the leading researchers on lightweight foams and has extensively worked on hollow particle filled composite materials called syntactic foams. Gupta developed a new functionally graded syntactic foam material and a method to create multifunctional syntactic foams. His team has also created an ultralight magnesium alloy syntactic foam that is able to float on water. In recent years, his work has focused on digital manufacturing methods for composite materials and manufacturing cybersecurity.

Gupta has appeared on Discovery Channel and in National Geographic as a materials science expert, particularly for lightweight materials. In 2012, Gupta explained the science behind athletic helmet construction as part of a National Science Foundation-sponsored video featured on NBC Learn during the 2012 Summer Olympics, which was a series of 10 videos that had more than 125 million views and won a Telly Award.

== Education ==
In 1996, Gupta graduated from the Malaviya National Institute of Technology-Jaipur with a Bachelor of Engineering degree. He received a Master of Engineering degree from the Indian Institute of Science in 1998. In 2003, Gupta graduated with a Doctor of Philosophy in Engineering Science (Mechanical Engineering) from Louisiana State University in Baton Rouge.

== Research ==
=== Polymer matrix composite materials ===
Gupta began his work on lightweight porous composite materials called syntactic foams in 1997. His work on polymer matrix syntactic foams resulted in several fundamental developments including establishing the wall thickness of hollow particle reinforcement as an important parameter, in addition to the volume fraction, for controlling the properties of syntactic foams. Another development was the use of a combination of particle wall thickness and volume fraction to develop a new type of functionally graded composite materials that has higher damage tolerance than other types of foams. Additionally, a method was developed that is capable of providing syntactic foams tailored for several mechanical, thermal, electrical, and physical properties simultaneously. Use of polymer matrix syntactic foams in USS Zumwalt for lightweight and stealth has been reported.

Gupta worked on the use of fly ash hollow particles (cenospheres) in creating syntactic foams. Fly ash is an environmental pollutant and beneficial uses of this material are desired. The work of fly ash utilization in composite materials was featured in National Geographic and Fast Company magazine.

=== Metal matrix syntactic foams ===
Gupta has studied aluminum, magnesium, iron and invar matrix syntactic foams. His work produced the development of a magnesium-alloy matrix syntactic foam that has density of 0.9 g/cc and can float on water. Gupta and his team were the first to create this lightweight metal matrix composite with no porosity in the matrix, which received media attention. At this density level, metal matrix composites can compete against polymer matrix composites but also provide higher temperature withstanding capabilities. His team was also the first to report synthesis of a metal matrix syntactic foam core sandwich composite.

=== Studies on high strain rate properties of materials ===
Gupta studied several composites that have applications as protective materials in civilian and military vehicles. He has used split-Hopkinson pressure bar to study response of polymer and metal matrix syntactic foams. The change in the direction of fracture as the strain rate increases was reported as one of the novel findings in these studies. Gupta studied the response of bones and tissue for high strain rate properties and his research showed that the fracture of bones can be very different at high strain rate compression, such as high speed car crash or bomb blast. His research was covered in LiveScience and Scientific American. This study showed a network of micro cracks in the bone, apart from large fractures, which could be missed in routine imaging.

=== Fiber-optic sensors ===
Gupta’s group researches the integration of sensors with composite materials to help in detecting the damage during their service condition. His work resulted in the development of a new patented fiber-optic sensor design. The sensor, based on intensity modulation in optical fiber through a curved section, is capable of measuring displacement or strain. Due to small size of this sensor, it can be integrated with composite materials.

== Other activities ==
Gupta is an advocate of communicating science and technology to non-scientists and youth. He has written several articles explaining how scientific discoveries are transitioning into modern systems. Gupta wrote an article about helmets used in professional sports and recreation and was featured in a video produced by NBC Learn in his lab on helmets used in Olympic sports. He hosts high school students in his research lab during a summer program called Applied Research Innovations in Science and Engineering (ARISE). Gupta is a member of the Composites Materials Committee of TMS and ASM-International as well as the editorial board of Composites Part B: Engineering (Elsevier), Materials Science and Engineering A (Elsevier), Materials Processing and Characterization (ASTM) and Journal of Composites (Hindawi).

== Award recognition ==
Gupta has been recognized by various professional societies with awards such as TMS Brimacombe Medalist Award, ASM-International Silver Medal, TMS Professional Development Award, ASM–Indian Institute of Metals (ASM-IIM) Visiting Lectureship, and Air Force Summer Faculty Fellowship for his research and lectureship. He is an elected Fellow of ASM International and the American Society for Composites in the class of 2022. He also received the ASNT Fellowship award in 2022.

== Bibliography ==
- Gupta, N., & Rohatgi, P. (2014). Metal matrix syntactic foams: Processing, microstructure, properties and applications (p. 370). Lancaster, Pennsylvania: DEStech Publications.
- Gupta, N., Pinisetty, D., & Shunmugasamy, V. (2013). Reinforced polymer matrix syntactic foams: Effect of nano and micro-scale reinforcement (p. 80). New York, New York: Springer International Publishing.
- Poveda, R., & Gupta, N. (n.d.). Carbon Nanofiber Reinforced Polymer Composites (1st ed., p. 99). Springer International Publishing.
