= Shekhar Bhansali =

American computer scientist

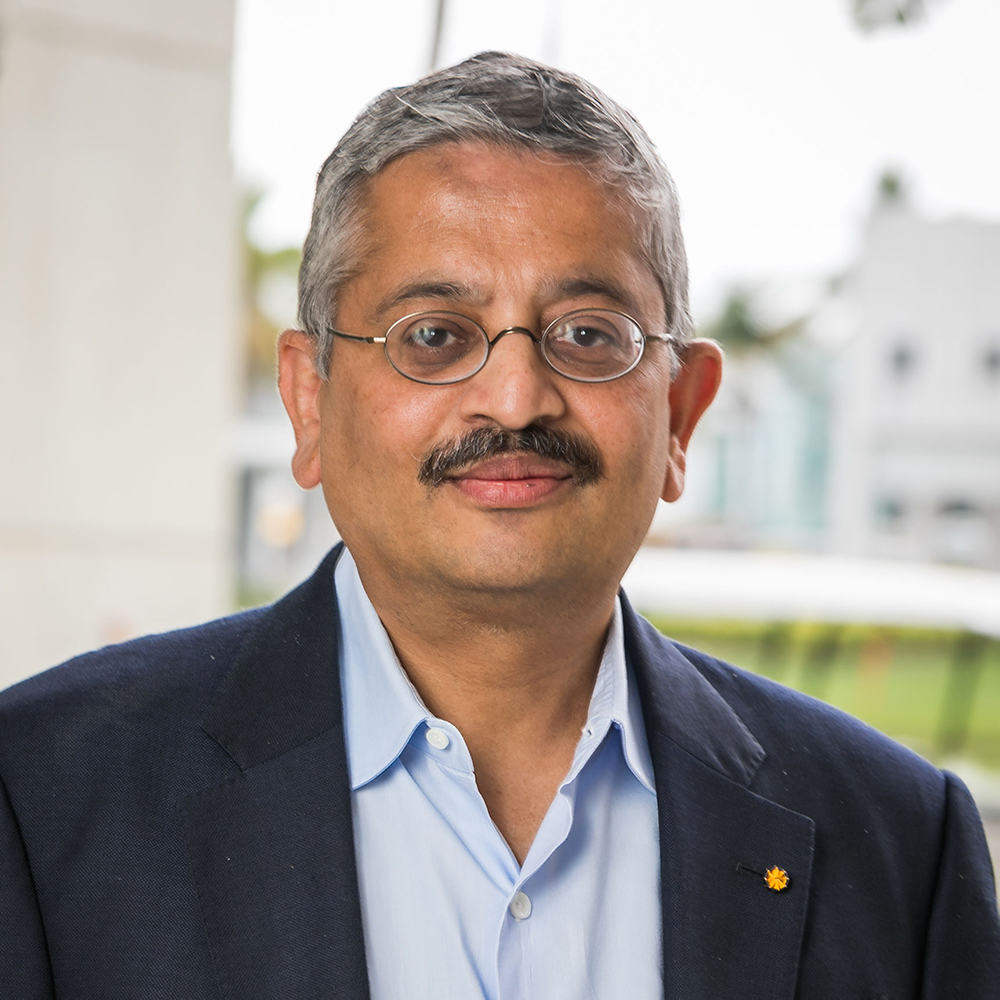

Distinguished University Professor and Chair of the Department of Electrical and Computer Engineering at Vanderbilt University (2025 - Present) Division Director of National Science Foundation EECS Program (2019 - 2020) Alcatel-Lucent Professor and Distinguished University Professor in the Florida International University Florida International University (2011-2025) Chair of the Department of Electrical and Computer Engineering at Florida International University (2011-2020)

Personal details
- Born: India
- Education: IIT Madras; RMIT University; NIT Jaipur

Shekhar Bhansali Shekhar Bhansali, Ph.D., is Distinguished University Professor and Chair of the Department of Electrical and Computer Engineering at Vanderbilt University. Prior to this he was division director in Electrical, Communication and Cyber Systems (ECCS) at the National Science Foundation. He also serves as an Alcatel-Lucent Professor and Distinguished University Professor in the Florida International University (FIU) Department of Electrical and Computer Engineering. Bhansali’s main research interests are in nanotechnology, biosensors, and microfluidics. He holds 40 patents, has published over 300 publications, and has advised more than 40 Ph.D. students and postdoctoral fellows in research. He was elevated to a Fellow of the IEEE in 2023.

== Education ==
Bhansali received his Bachelor of Engineering (B.E) in metallurgical engineering at Malaviya National Institute of Technology, Jaipur, Rajasthan, India. He then received his Master of Technology (M.Tech) from Indian Institute of Technology Madras and Ph.D. in electrical engineering at RMIT University Australia.

== Career ==
Shekhar Bhansali began his career in 1995 as a lecturer in the Department of Metallurgical Engineering at RMIT University, Melbourne, Australia. He came to the United States in 1988 and joined CMSM, ECECS Department, University of Cincinnati as a research faculty. In 2000, he joined University of South Florida and led a number of inter-connected interdisciplinary graduate student research and training programs, including NSF-IGERT, NSF’s Bridge to the Doctorate and Alfred P. Sloan Doctoral Fellowship Programs to increase diversity, retention and graduation rates.

== Awards ==
- Top Scholar Award from FIU in 2014
- William R. Jones Outstanding Mentor Award in 2011 and 2009
- Mentor of the Year Award from Alfred P. Sloan Foundation in 2009
- Outstanding Mentor Award from the McKnight Foundation in 2004
- NSF Career Award in 2003
- In 2018, Bhansali has named as a Fellow of the American Association for the Advancement of Science and the National Academy of Inventors.
- Elevated to IEEE Fellow in 2023 "for contributions to portable real-time sensing devices for continuous monitoring".

== Books ==
- Mems for Biomedical Applications
- Chemical Sensors 7 -and- MEMS/NEMS 7
