= Global Organization for People of Indian Origin =

Global Organization of People of Indian Origin (GOPIO) is an international network of people of Indian origin (PIO).

== History ==
GOPIO was founded at the First Global Convention of People of Indian Origin in New York City in 1989. The name GOPIO was adopted by the Steering Committee formed after the First Global Convention. The initial thrust of GOPIO was fighting human rights violation against people of Indian origin.

Although this has been improved in the last decade, human rights violations continue to be a major issue for PIOs living outside India. GOPIO has now set its priorities in pooling its resources, both financial and professional, for the benefit of PIOs, the countries they come from and India.

GOPIO's Founder President is Dr. Thomas Abraham who served since inception till 2004. Inder Singh took over as president in 2004 and served till 2009 when Lord Diljit Rana, a member of the House of Lords in London was elected. Lord Rana was followed by Ashook Ramsaran who served from 2011 to 2016. Niraj Baxi of Silicon Valley, California served from March 2016 to December 2017. Sunny Kulathakal served from 2018 to 2022. The incumbent president of the GOPIO is Prakash Shah is from New Jersey, USA. The Founder President was elected again as the Chairman of GOPIO in 2016. In 2009, GOPIO launched GOPIO Foundation For People of Indian Origin with Dr. Thomas Abraham as its first Executive Trustee.

== See also ==
- Non-resident Indian and Person of Indian Origin
