= Birla Institute of Technology, Jaipur =

Engineering institute in Rajasthan, India

Coordinates: 26.854536°N 75.8261661°E

Birla Institute of Technology, Mesra Off Campus Jaipur
- बिरला प्रौद्योगिकी संस्थान
- Motto: सा विद्या या विमुक्तये (Sā Vidyā Yā Vimuktaye)
- Motto in English: Learning is that which Liberates
- Type: Deemed University
- Established: 1995
- Parent institution: BIT Mesra
- Affiliations: AICTE, ACU, AIU, PCI, NAAC, NBA, UGC
- Chairman: CK Birla
- Chancellor: Ramesh Bais
- Vice-Chancellor: Dr. Indranil Manna
- Director: Dr. Peeyush Tewari
- Location: Jaipur, Rajasthan, India
- Website: BIT Mesra, Jaipur Campus

Birla Institute of Technology, Off Campus Jaipur (abbreviated BIT Jaipur or BIT Mesra, Off Campus Jaipur) is an educational centre offering undergraduate and postgraduate courses located in Jaipur, Rajasthan, India. It functions under the academic guidance of the parent university Birla Institute of Technology, Mesra, Ranchi in terms of the academic curriculum, calendar as well as the semester examinations.

== History ==
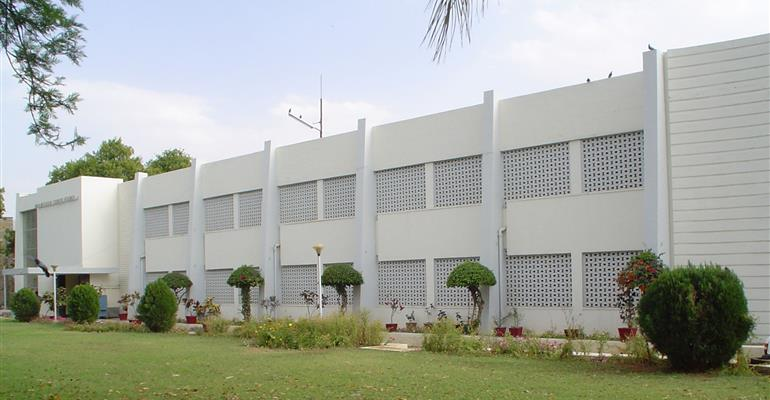
BIT Mesra, Jaipur Campus

The Birla Institute of Technology, Mesra, Jaipur Campus was established in 1995 in the campus of the Birla Institute of Scientific Research (BISR). It started by offering PG level programmes in computer science and computer applications. Since then the range of programmes as well as the facilities have expanded to offer a wide range of academic programmes both UG & PG level.

== Academic programmes ==
Undergraduate Programme

- B.Tech. in Computer Science
- B.Tech. in Electronics & Communication Engineering
- B.Tech. in Electrical & Electronics Engineering
- B.Tech. in Artificial Intelligence
- B.Sc. (Animation & Multimedia)
- BCA
- BBA

Postgraduate Programme

- MBA
- MCA
- Master In Animation Design
- Integrated MCA

Doctoral (Ph.D.) Programme

- Computer Science and Engineering
- Electrical & Electronics Engineering
- Management Studies
- Physics
- Chemistry
- Mathematics
- Animation and Multimedia

== Admissions ==
- B.Tech.: Through merit list based on CRL Rank in JEE Main conducted by NTA, established by the MoE, GoI, from 2018.
- B.Sc.(Animation & Multimedia): Based on marks obtained in the required subject in Class XII / Intermediate / equivalent qualifying examination and performance in Creative Aptitude Test & Interview. Weightage of marks considered in merit list is (50%+40%+10%) respectively.
- BCA: On the basis of marks obtained by the candidates in Class XII / Intermediate / equivalent qualifying examination.
- BBA: On the basis of marks obtained by the candidates in Class XII / Intermediate / equivalent qualifying examination.
- MCA: Based on Online Entrance Exam followed by Counselling.

== Student life ==
=== Annual festivals ===
BIT Mesra, Jaipur campus has various active clubs and committees for organisation of events and festivals. Major festivals of the campus are:-

Techvibes It is the technical festival of the BIT Jaipur. It is a two-day inter college event being organised in the Spring Semester. Events include Most Famous HACKATHON, Coding Events sponsored by Topcoder and CSI, Robotic events, Technical Quizzes and Seminars, DJ and EDM Nites. In the Year 2014 Raeth Band of Pakistan performed during the Techvibes.

Cavorts It is an Inter College Sports Event held every year in the Monsoon semester. The events include cricket, basketball, volleyball, kho kho, kabaddi, badminton and chess among others.

Vibrations It is the Cultural Fest event of the Jaipur Campus. Held every year in the Spring Semester, The fest consists of Dance Competitions, BIT Idol, War of the Bands, Pro Nite, DJ Nites and many off-stage events. Famous musicians have participated in this festival which include Mohit Gaur India's Raw Star Finalist, Rudraksh Band, DJ Akshay Sehgal, Bollywood Singer Aman Trikha etc.

Dandiya Night Dandiya Raas is the traditional folk dance form of Gujarat, it is performed depicting scenes of Holi, and lila of Radha and Krishna. It is the featured dance of Navratri evenings in Western India. During Navratri festival, BIT Mesra, Jaipur campus organises Dandiya Nights for students for better understanding of different cultures.

=== Social cause ===
On 8 March 2014 The Students of BIT Mesra, Jaipur Campus have organized a marathon "Run for Women's Pride" to mark International Women's Day. The event was co-sponsored by TimesPro. The marathon was organized to spread awareness about development of women in the country through education. About 500 students, people from different walks of life and TimesPro employees took part in it.

=== Clubs and societies ===
BIT Jaipur has many active clubs & societies which gives students the opportunity to showcase their talents in various extra Co Curricular activities.

- Technical & Management Society
- Cultural Society
- Sports Club
- Photographic Society
- Robotics Club
- Design Team
- Programming Club, BIT Jaipur
- Computer Society of India, BIT Jaipur
- IETE, BIT Jaipur
- Entrepreneurship Cell, BIT Jaipur
- Quizophillic, The Quizzing Club

== See also ==
- BIT Mesra
- Birla Institute of Technology International Centre
- Birla Institute of Technology – Science and Technology Entrepreneurs' Park
- CK Birla Group
