= Thomas Abraham =

Indian chairman

- Born: August 11, 1948 (age 77); Pathanamthitta, Kerala, India
- Occupation: Chairman of GOPIO

Thomas Abraham (born 11 September 1948) is an Indian and is the founder president and chairman of the Global Organization for People of Indian Origin (GOPIO), having previously founded the organization and served as its president. He was the Convener of the First Global Convention of People of Indian Origin held in New York, where GOPIO was formed. Earlier, Dr. Abraham served as the executive trustee of GOPIO Foundation. He is also president of Innovative Research and Products, Inc., Stamford, CT, US, a multi-client market research firm in new generation technologies specializing in advanced materials, nanotechnology, electronic components, energy generation and storage devices, etc.

== Life ==
Abraham was born on 11 September 1948 in Kerala, India, and has been influential in the Non-Resident Indian/People of Indian Origin NRI/PIO movement over the last four decades.
